= Modern: The Modern Movement in Britain =

2005 book by Alan Powers

- Author: Alan Powers
- Subject: Modernist architecture in Britain
- Publisher: Merrell
- Publication date: 2005
- Pages: 240
- ISBN: 9781858942551 (hardback)
- OCLC: 475515953
- Website: Merrell

Modern: The Modern Movement in Britain is a non-fiction book by Alan Powers, first published in 2005 by Merrell, about Modernism in British architecture, mainly focusing on the period between 1930 and 1940. The bulk of the book is a gazetteer of 60 architects or architectural practices, including both famous figures and lesser-known ones. The book received broadly positive reviews, with its wide coverage, and particularly its wide coverage of women architects of the period, being generally appreciated. Some reviewers criticise the inclusion of modern buildings lying outside the definition of Modernist. A further critique is that the analysis lacks depth. The book is illustrated with colour photographs by Morley von Sternberg.

== Background ==
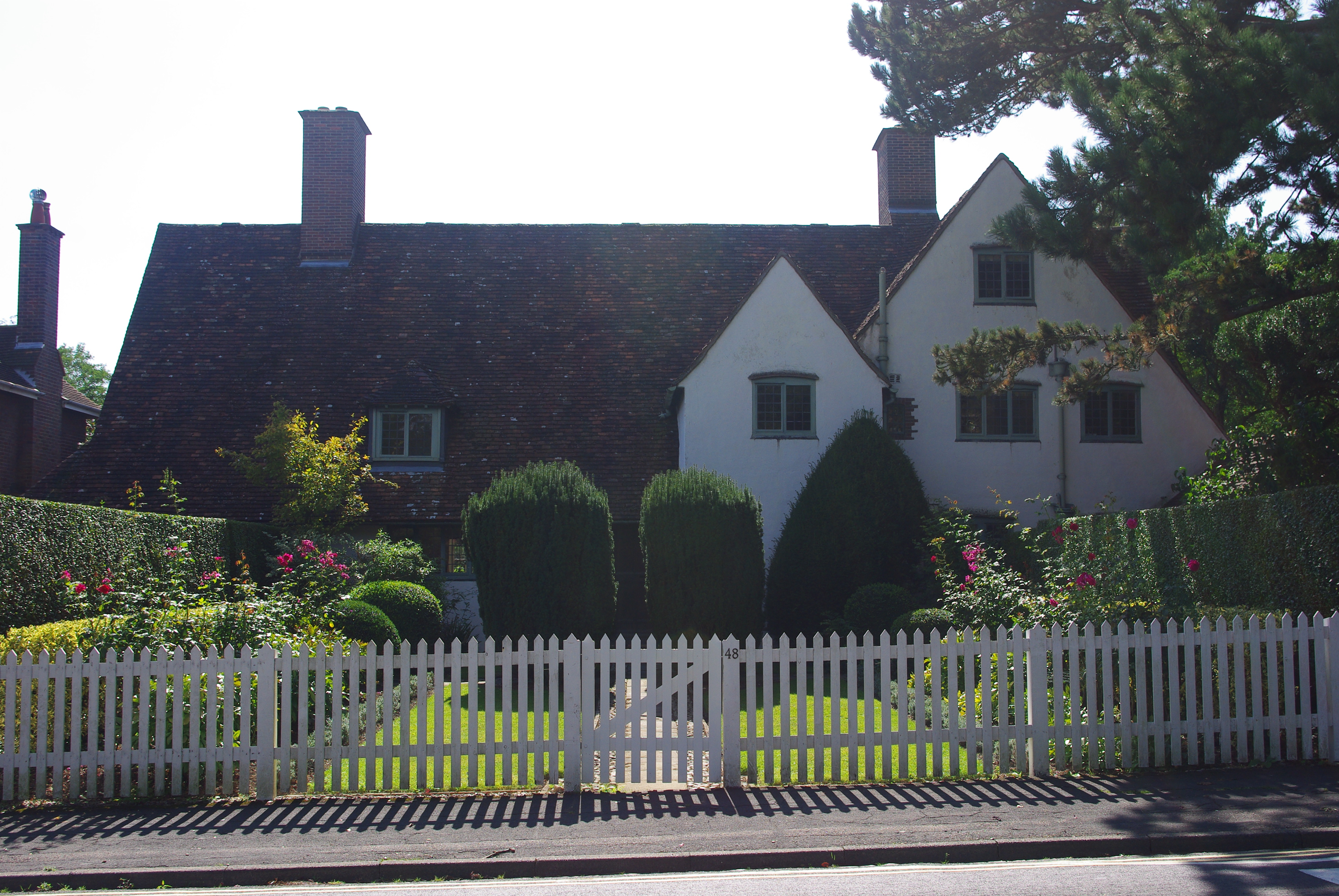
Powers considers Baillie Scott's 48 Storey's Way, Cambridge, typical of the English Arts & Crafts movement and a precursor to Modernism

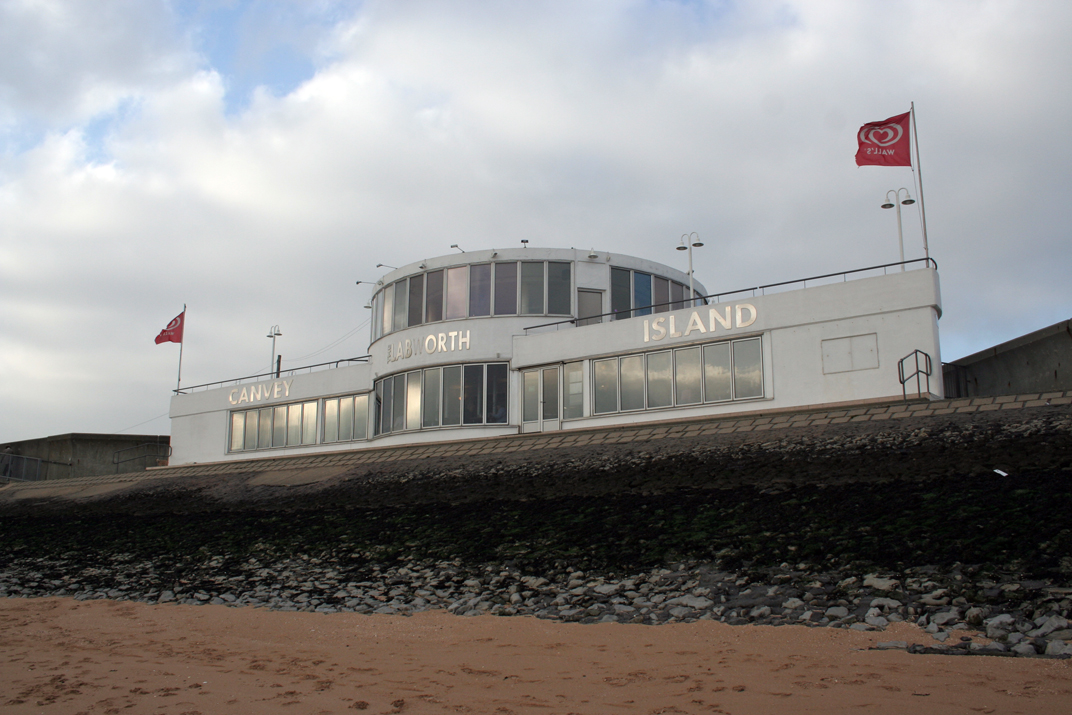
Labworth Café (Ove Arup)

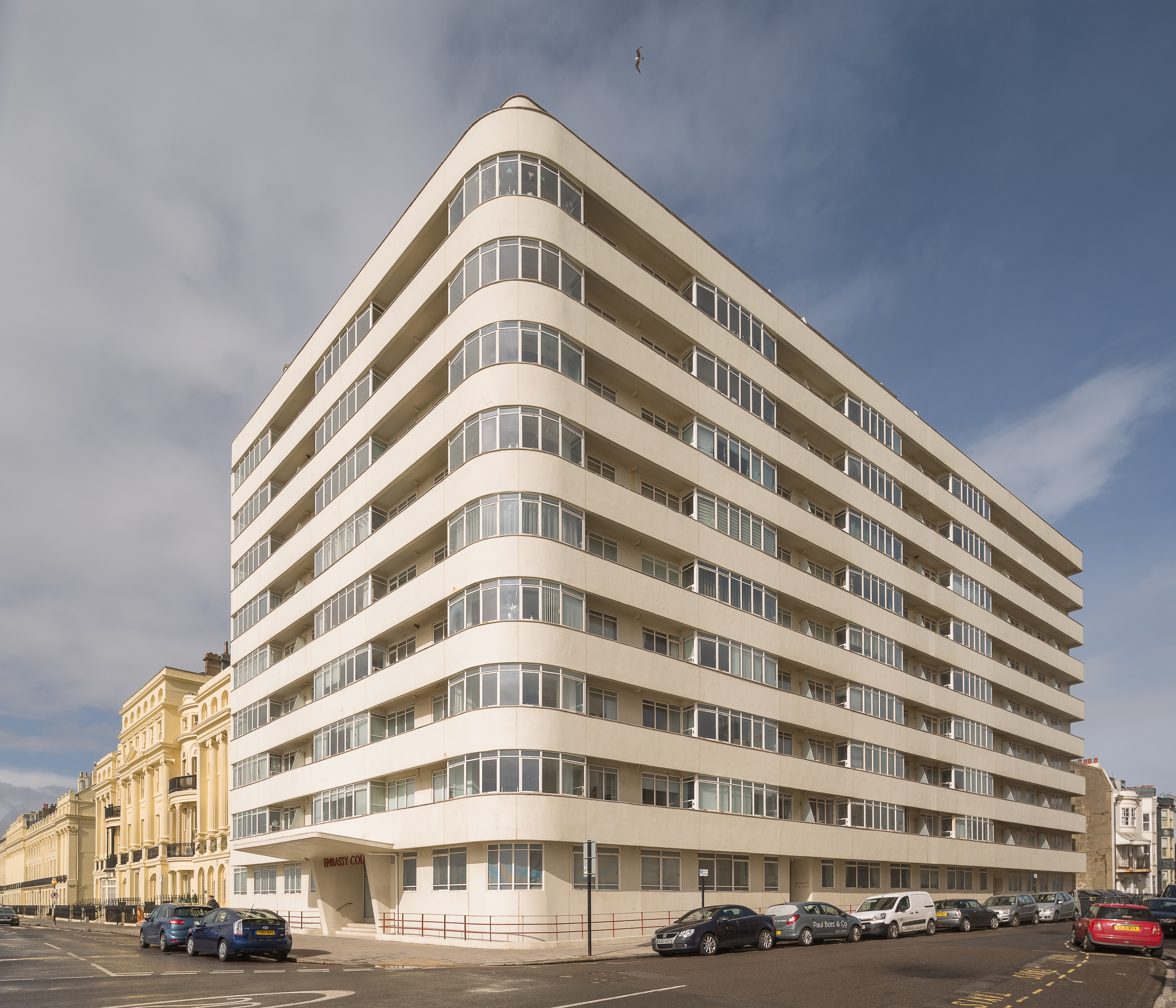
Embassy Court (Wells Coates)

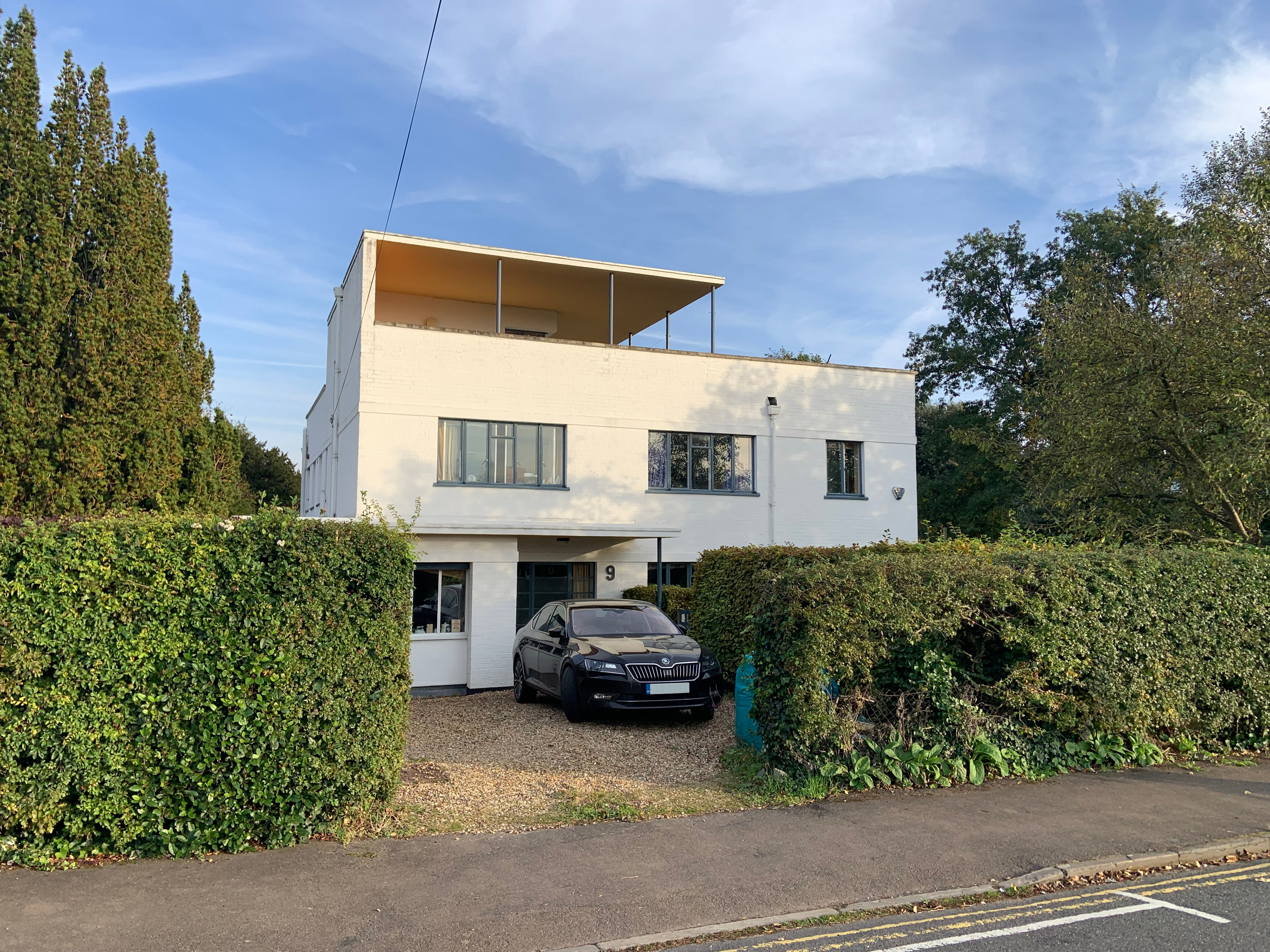
9 Wilberforce Road (Dora Cosens)

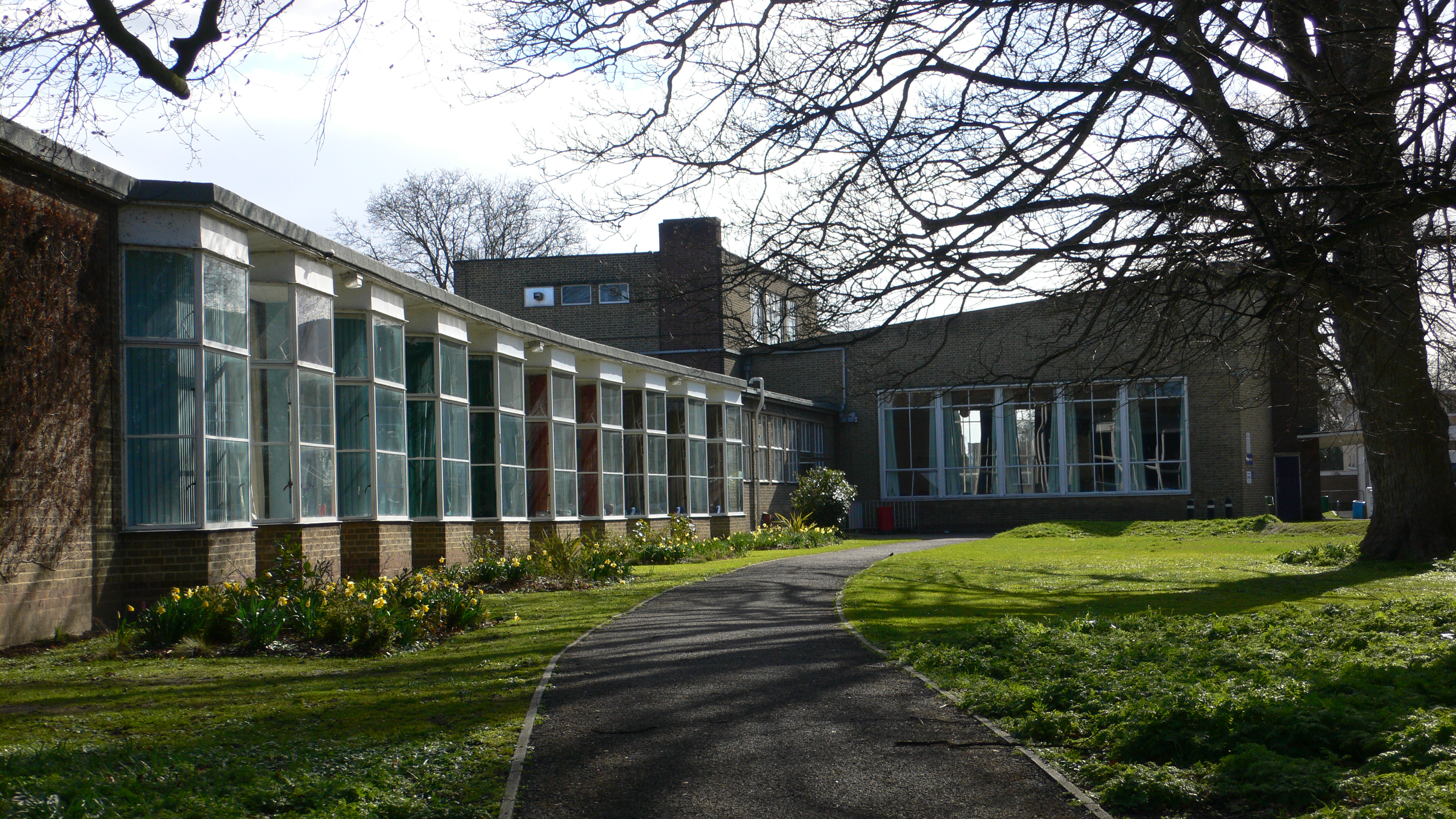
Impington Village College (Walter Gropius)

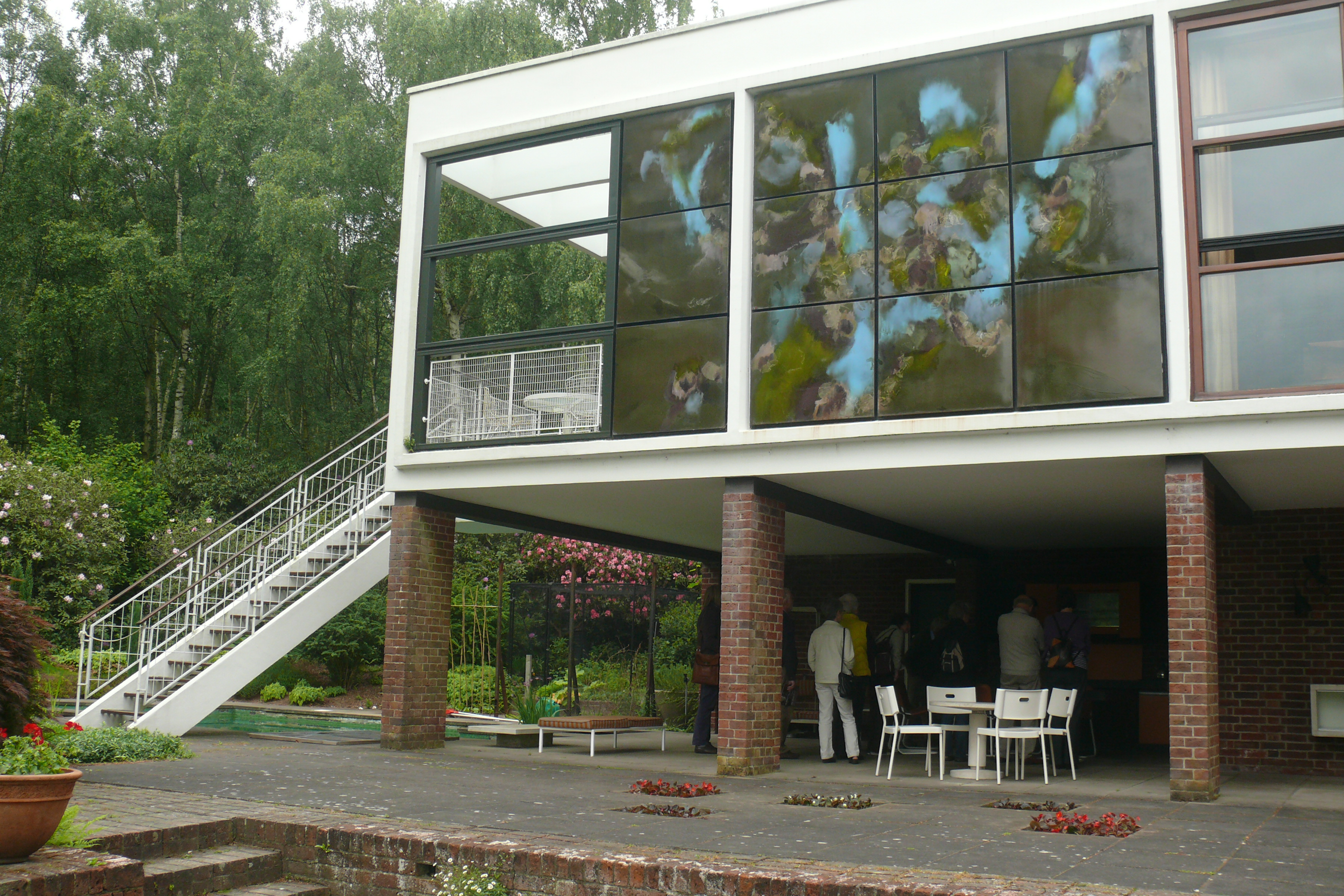
The Homewood (Patrick Gwynne)

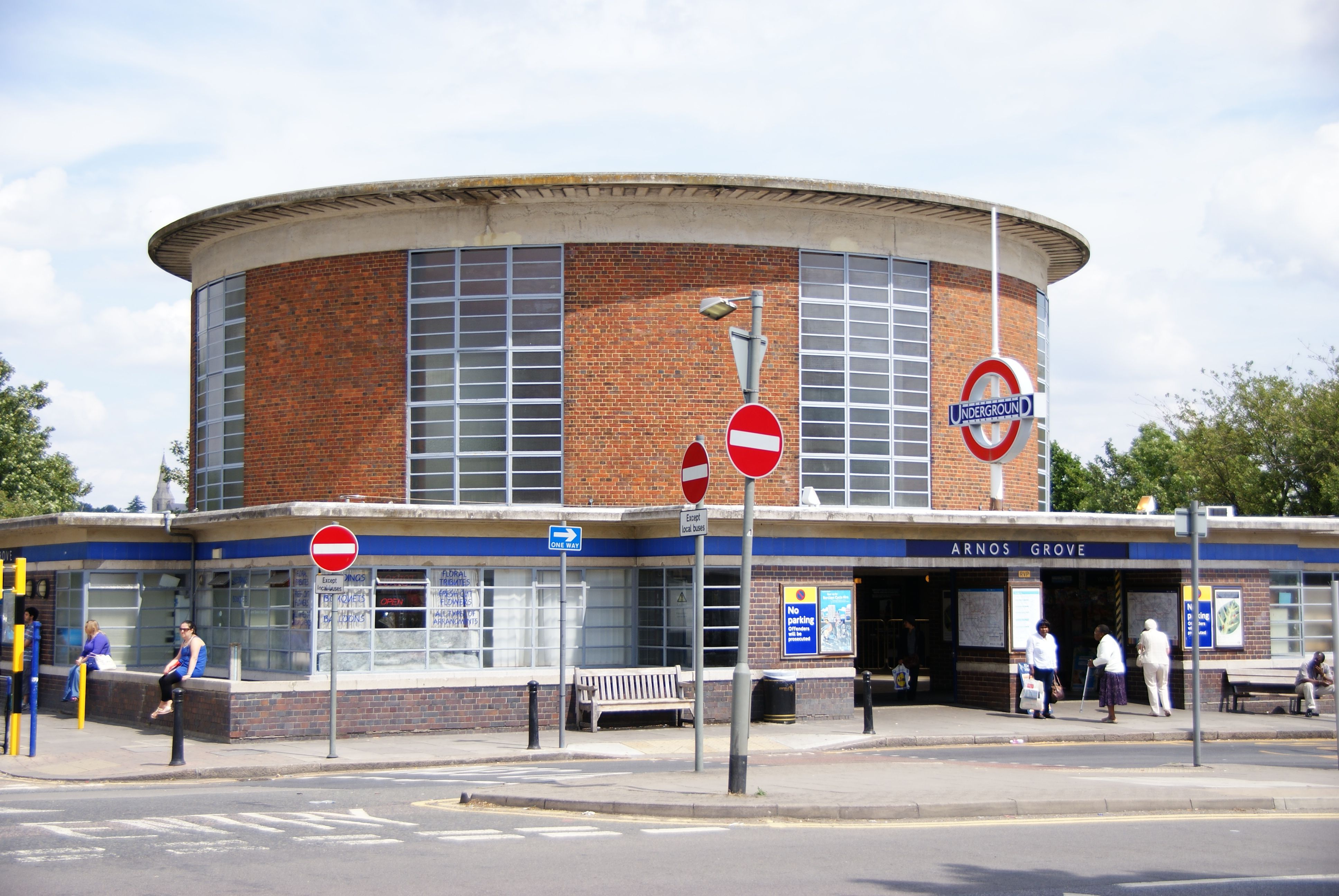
Arnos Grove underground station (Charles Holden)

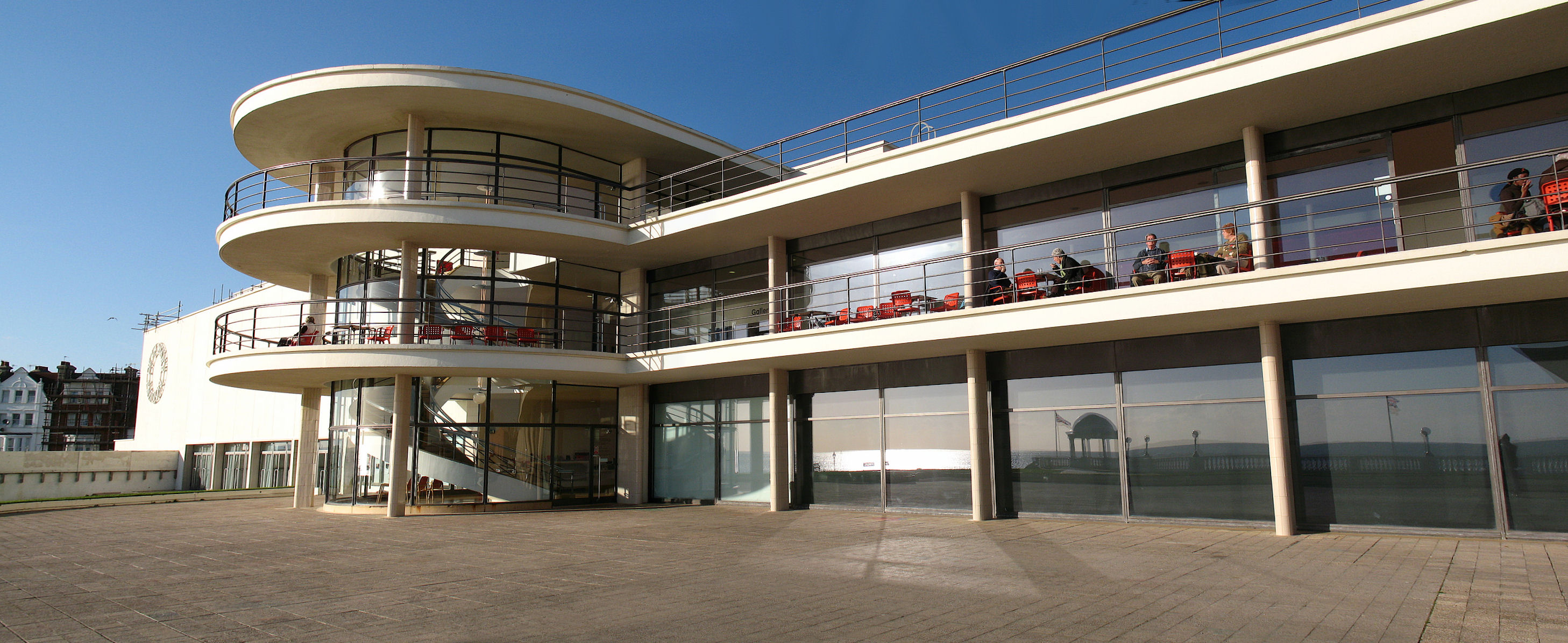
De La Warr Pavilion (Erich Mendelsohn)

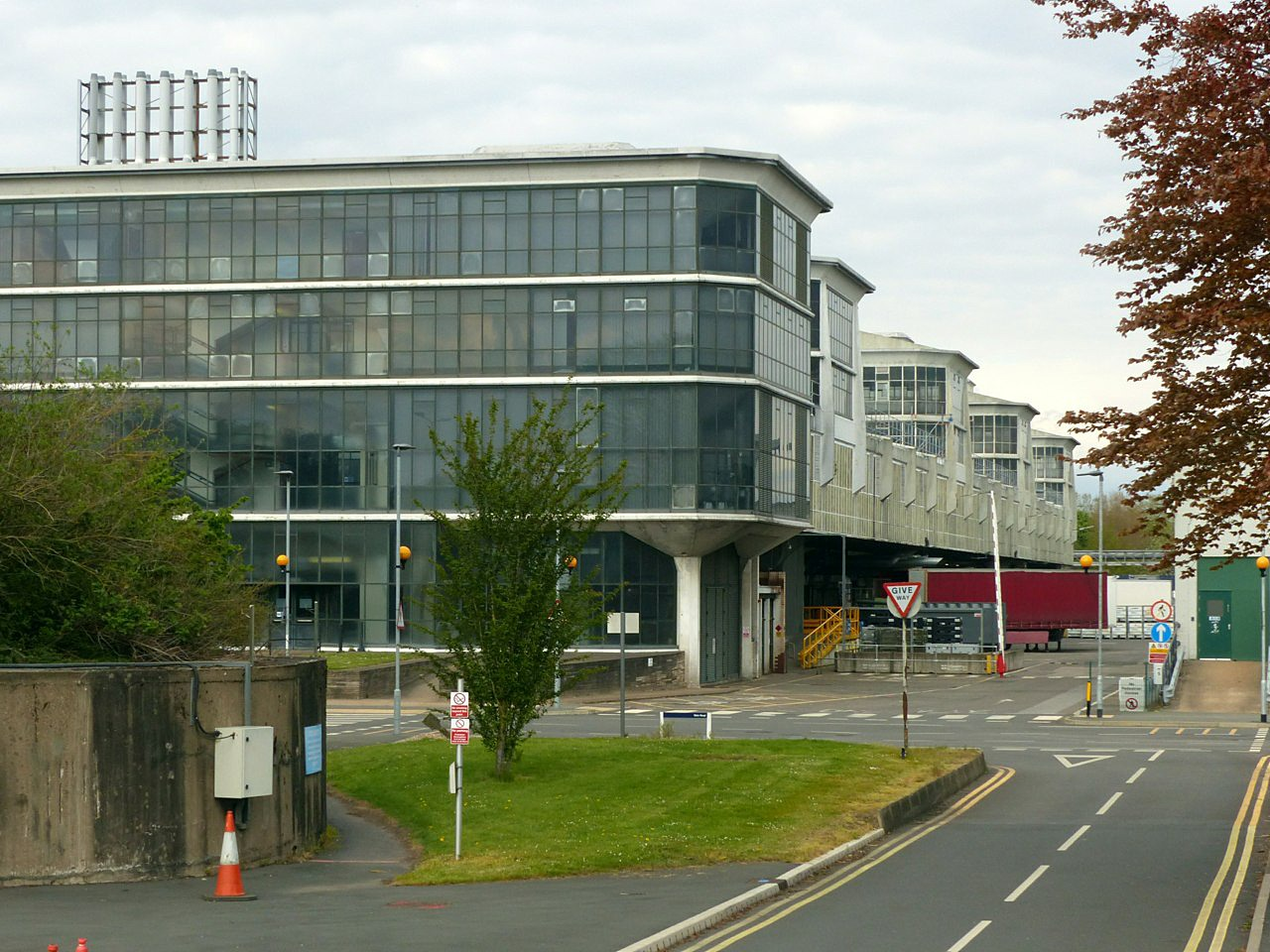
Boots Packed Wet Goods Factory (D10) (Owen Williams)

The author Alan Powers is an architectural historian in academia and an architectural writer. Kenneth Powell describes him as a "critic of independent mind and broad sympathies" with the "Modern Movement ... in his blood". Powers had previously written on the Modernist architect Berthold Lubetkin and The Twentieth Century House in Britain (2004), and his subsequent books include Britain: Modern Architectures in History (2007). The inspiration for Modern came from the renovation of two 20th-century buildings, Charles Rennie Mackintosh's 78 Derngate, Northampton, and Wells Coates' Lawn Road Flats, Hampstead. The book is partly based on an unpublished 1992–93 survey carried out by Powers for Docomomo UK, funded by the Architects' Registration Council of the UK.

== Publication history ==
The book was first published in hardback in 2005 by Merrell. It came out in paperback with the same publishers in 2007 (ISBN 9781858944050).

== Contents ==
Modern opens with a two-page preface that explains Powers' intentions and the selection criteria he applied to the architects and buildings included. An eight-page introduction covers the period before 1930. This is followed by 24-page essay on Modernism in British architecture between 1930 and 1940, which covers a range of social, political, economic and historical issues that Powers asserts differentiate the Modernist movement in British architecture from that in other countries. The essay discusses the effects of global events such as the First World War and the Depression, as well as the exodus of architects from Europe in the lead up to the Second World War. Powers traces the roots of the British movement to the Arts and Crafts movement, in opposition to the conventional views of, for example, Nikolaus Pevsner, James Maude Richards and Sigfried Giedion. Powers discusses the British response to the French Le Corbusier versus the Swedish Gunnar Asplund, as well as debates over concrete versus other materials. The book also includes a discussion of professional training.

The main body of the book is a section covering 60 architects and architectural practices, organised alphabetically, with 91 in total. Each architect is allotted at least a double-page spread containing biographical material, a discussion of at least one of their buildings, with plans and colour photographs, and sources. A few important architects and practices receive deeper coverage. The book covers nine women architects.

Modern ends with two brief essays covering post-war trends and the conservation of buildings from this period. There is two pages of suggestions for further reading and a three-page index. The book is illustrated with more than 200 newly commissioned colour photographs by the British architectural photographer Morley von Sternberg, as well as older images where needed to illustrate buildings that have been significantly altered or demolished.

=== List of architects and companies ===
- Norah Aiton, Elizabeth (Betty) Scott – Aiton & Co. Factory Offices, Derby
- Ove Arup – Labworth Café, Canvey Island, Essex
- Geoffrey Bazeley – Tregannick, Penzance, Cornwall
- Elisabeth Benjamin – East Wall, Gerrards Cross, Buckinghamshire
- Margaret Justin Blanco White – Shawms, Conduit Head Road, Cambridge
- Marcel Breuer – Sea Lane House, Angmering, West Sussex; Gane Pavilion, Bristol
- Michael J. H. Bunney, Charlotte Bunney – 13 Downshire Hill, Hampstead
- Burnet, Tait & Lorne – Silver End, Braintree, Essex; Royal Masonic Hospital, Hammersmith; Burlington Danes School, Hammersmith; The German Hospital, Hackney
- N. F. Cachemaille-Day – St Saviour's Church, Eltham
- H. T. Cadbury-Brown – British Railways Office, Bayswater
- George Checkley – Willow House, Conduit Head Road, Cambridge
- Serge Chermayeff – Gilbey Offices, Oval Road, London; Bentley Wood, Halland, East Sussex
- Denis Clarke Hall – Richmond High School for Girls, Richmond, North Yorkshire
- Wells Coates – Lawn Road Flats (Isokon Flats), Hampstead; Embassy Court, Hove, East Sussex; 10 Palace Gate, London
- George Coles – Odeon Cinema, Muswell Hill
- Connell, Ward & Lucas – High and Over, Amersham, Buckinghamshire; The White House, Grayswood, Haslemere, Surrey; 66 Frognal, London
- Dora Cosens – 9 Wilberforce Road, Cambridge
- William Crabtree – Peter Jones, Sloane Square, London
- Mary Crowley – 102–106 (even numbers), Orchard Road, Tewin, Hertfordshire
- Joseph Emberton – Royal Corinthian Yacht Club, Burnham on Crouch, Essex; Simpsons, 203–206 Piccadilly; Blackpool Pleasure Beach
- Frederick Etchells – Crawford's, 233 High Holborn, London
- Rudolf Frankel – House in the Home Counties
- Edwin Maxwell Fry – Little Winch, Chipperfield Common, Hertfordshire; Kensal House, 1–68 Ladbroke Grove, London; Miramonte, Warren Rise, Coombe, Kingston upon Thames, Surrey
- Frederick Gibberd – Pullman Court, Streatham Hill
- Ernő Goldfinger – Hill Pasture, Broxted, Essex; 1–3 Willow Road, Hampstead; 94 Wimpole Street, London; 2 Golders Green Road, London
- H. S. Goodhart-Rendel – St Olaf House, Hay's Wharf, London
- Dora Gordine – Dorich House, Kingston Vale, London
- Walter Gropius – The Wood House, Shipbourne, Kent; Impington Village College, Impington, Cambridgeshire
- Patrick Gwynne – The Homewood, Esher, Surrey
- P. J. B. Harland – Pen Pits, Penselwood, Somerset
- Oliver Hill – LMS Midland Hotel, Morecambe, Lancashire; Joldwynds, Holmbury St Mary, Surrey; Frinton Park Estate, Essex; The Prospect Inn, Minster-in-Thanet, Kent; The Hill House, Hampstead; Landfall, Crichel Mount Road, Poole, Dorset
- Hoar, Marlow & Lovett – The 'Beehive' Terminal, Crawley, East Sussex
- Charles Holden – Southgate underground station, London; Arnos Grove underground station, London
- Geoffrey Jellicoe – The Caveman Restaurant, Cheddar Gorge, Somerset
- R. W. H. Jones – Saltdean Lido, Saltdean, East Sussex
- Vladimir Karfik – Bata Estate, East Tilbury, Essex
- William Kininmonth – 46A Dick Place, Newington, Edinburgh
- Denys Lasdun – 32 Newton Road, London
- Frank Latham – Jubilee Pool, Penzance, Cornwall
- William Lescaze – High Cross House, Dartington, Devon; Boarding Houses, Dartington Hall School, Devon
- Berthold Lubetkin – Penguin Pool, London Zoo, Regent's Park, London; Dudley Zoo, Dudley, West Midlands; Highpoint I and Highpoint II, North Hill, London; 85–91 (odd numbers) Genesta Road, Plumstead; Six Pillars, Crescentwood Road, London; Hillfield ('Bungalow A'), Dagnall, Buckinghamshire; Holly Frindle ('Bungalow B'), Whipsnade Park, Dunstable, Bedfordshire; Finsbury Health Centre, Pine Street, London
- J. Leslie Martin, Sadie Speight – Brackenfell, Brampton, Cumbria; Nursery School, Hartford, Northwich, Cheshire
- Raymond McGrath – Finella, Queens' Road, Cambridge; St Ann's Hill, Chertsey, Surrey
- Erich Mendelsohn – De La Warr Pavilion, Bexhill, East Sussex; Shrub's Wood, Chalfont St Giles, Buckinghamshire; 64 Old Church Street, Chelsea
- Peter Moro – Harbour Meadow, Birdham, West Sussex
- Raymond Myerscough-Walker – 35 Hallams Lane, Chilwell, Nottingham
- Christopher Nicholson – Studio, Fryern Court, Fordingbridge, Hampshire; London Gliding Club, Dunstable Downs, Bedfordshire
- William A. Pite – Sully Hospital, Hayes Farm, South Glamorgan
- David Pleydell-Bouverie – Ramsgate Aerodrome, Ramsgate, Kent; Foreshore development, Folkestone, Kent
- John Proctor – Kirkby House, Kirkby Overblow, North Yorkshire
- W. H. Robinson – Kemnal Manor College of Technology, Sidcup, Kent
- Fritz A. Ruhemann – 2 South Parade, Chiswick
- Rudolf Otto Salvisberg – Roche Pharmaceuticals, Welwyn Garden City, Hertfordshire
- Samuel & Harding – New House, 13 Arkwright Road, Hampstead
- Marshall Sisson – 31 Madingley Road, Cambridge
- Tayler & Green – The Studio, Duke's Head Yard, Highgate
- Harry Weedon – Villa Marina, Craigside, Llandudno, Gwynedd
- Owen Williams – Daily Express Building, 120–129 Fleet Street, London; Boots Packed Wet Goods Factory (D10) and 'Drys' Building (D6), Beeston, Nottingham; Pioneer Health Centre, Peckham; Daily Express Building, Manchester; Dollis Hill Synagogue, Cricklewood
- F. R. S. Yorke – Torilla, Wilkins Green Lane, Nast Hyde, Hatfield, Hertfordshire; 60–72 (even numbers) Birmingham Road, Stratford upon Avon, Warwickshire

== Critical reception ==
Henry Matthews, in a review for The Art Book, describes the book's organisation as "exemplary". Jeremy Melvin, in a review for the magazine Architectural Review, likens the format with essays dominated by examples to F. R. S. Yorke's The Modern House. The architectural historian William Whyte, in a review for The British Art Journal, notes the "huge variety of architects and a still wider range of buildings" covered, and describes the book as a "memorial to these pioneers of the modern movement". The architect Dennis Sharp, writing in Docomomo Journal, also welcomes the breadth of coverage, which he says gives a "wonderful insight" into the range of British modernist buildings, some now lost. The architectural writer Mark Cousins, in a review for the journal Architectural Heritage, praises the book's "comprehensive nature". The architecture writer Kenneth Powell, in a review for the Architects' Journal, characterises the individual architects' entries as "workmanlike, but invaluable".

Several reviewers praise the inclusion of less well-known architects, either in general or with reference to a particular demographic. Cousins writes that "perhaps the most telling aspect of this book is its acknowledgement of the significant role played by women architects in shaping inter-war Britain", and the inclusion of a diversity of often lesser-known names, such as Elisabeth Benjamin, Charlotte Bunney, Dora Cosens, Dora Gordine and Justin Blanco White, is highlighted in multiple reviews. Several reviews also note the broad range of émigrés covered, including some lesser-known names, such as Rudolf Frankel and Fritz Ruhemann. Powell highlights the inclusion of regional figures such as Geoffrey Bazeley (Cornwall) and John Proctor (Yorkshire).

Some reviews are more critical of the range of architects and buildings covered. The academic Helen Searing, in a comparative review for the Journal of the Society of Architectural Historians, describes the highlighted works as a "pluralistic potpourri of physiognomically distinct buildings", covering a range of underlying philosophies, and cautions that some inclusions are modern but not modernist. Sharp highlights the "rather uncritical juxtaposition of the good, the bad and the indifferent", notes the absence of Arthur Korn and Rosenthal, and cautions that some works included would not be categorised as modern movement by Docomomo. Melvin finds the choice of examples restricted, and Cousins notes the paucity of Scottish buildings.

The book's underlying premise, that Modernist architecture in Britain is distinct from that in Continental Europe, convinces Whyte. Searing praises Powers' "habitually perceptive, sensitive, and persuasive prose". Powell describes the book as "packed with ideas, elegantly written and with broad appeal". The academic Jack Quinlan, writing in Choice, recommends the book, describing the introductory article as "highly informative". Matthews considers that the "well-conceived text" contextualises the British modernist movement, outlining the way in which it progressed "as deftly as is possible" considering the book's brevity.

Melvin, in a more-critical review, calls the book only a "starting point", which he considers, takes a "descriptive rather than analytical" approach. Matthews criticises the "lack of deeper analysis", noting that at multiple points further discussion would have been valuable, and calls for an expanded second edition. Powell criticises the brevity of the introductory article, which he writes is "just a brilliant sketch", and describes the book as "not quite the definitive account that Powers is so qualified to write". Whyte cautions about the use of the terms "modernism" and "Britishness".

Morley von Sternberg's colour photographs are highlighted by the majority of reviewers. Matthews describes them as "excellent", and states that their almost uniform sunny aspect lends "visual continuity". Cousins finds they make the book appear "fresh and relevant". Whyte calls the book a "visual delight", and states that the photographs show how "striking" the buildings must have originally appeared, as well as underlining their continuity with earlier traditions. Searing calls the photographs an "indispensable accompaniment" to the text.

Modern was included in a selection of the best books of 2005 by The Architects' Journal. Marcus Binney, the architecture correspondent for The Times, included it in his top six books on modern British buildings in 2008.
