= Dover Street =

Street in London, England

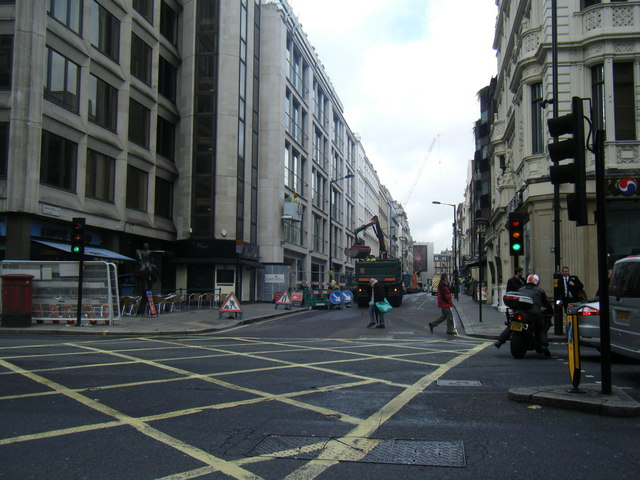
- View of Dover Street looking northwards towards Grafton Street
- Interactive map of Dover Street
- Namesake: Henry Jermyn, 1st Baron Dover
- Length: 0.1 mi (0.16 km)
- Location: Mayfair, London
- Postal code: W1
- Nearest Tube station: Green Park
- south end: Piccadilly; 51.5075°N 0.1414°W
- north end: Grafton Street; 51.5093°N 0.1431°W

Construction
- Construction start: 1683

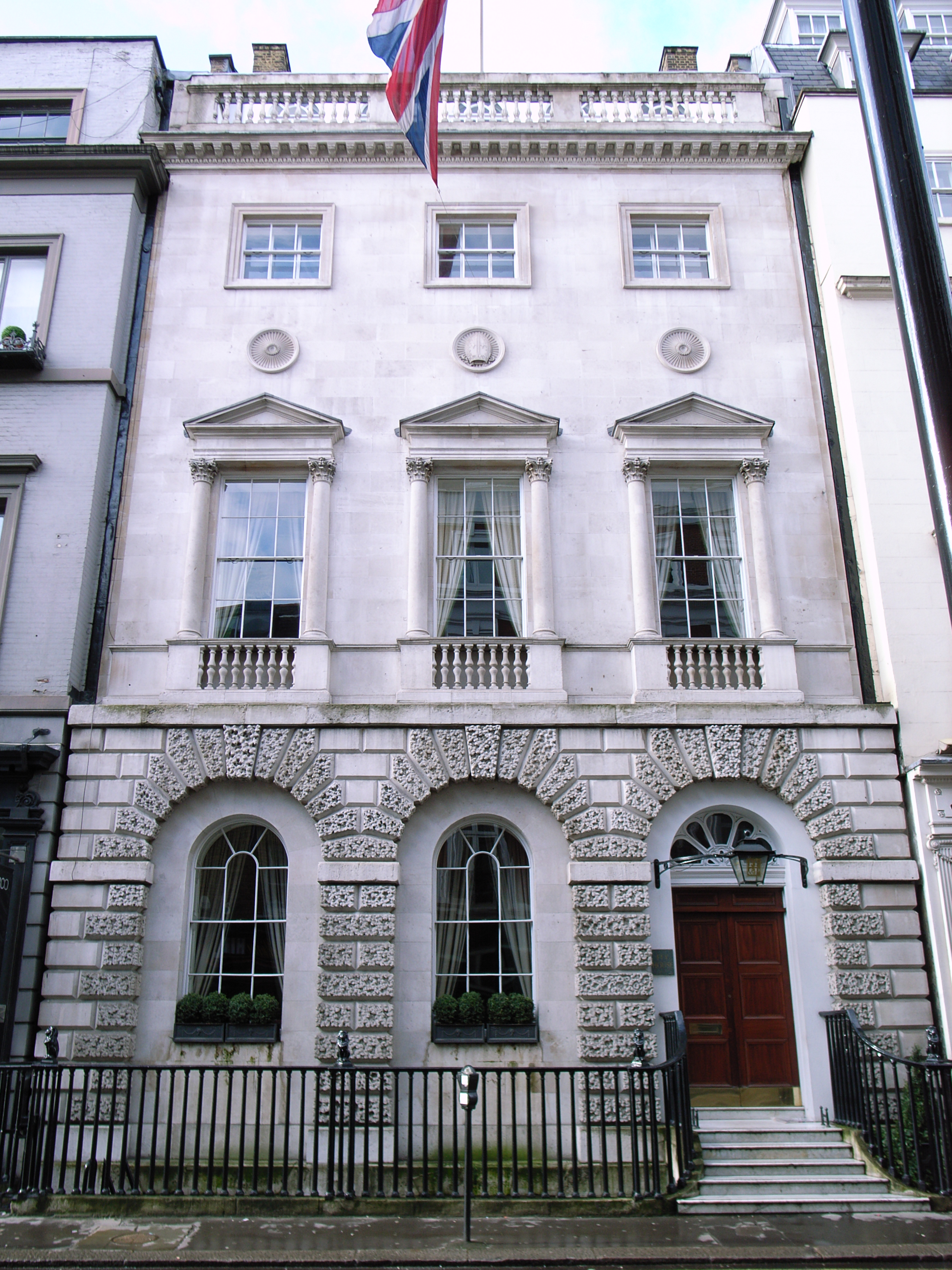
Example of Georgian architecture in Dover Street

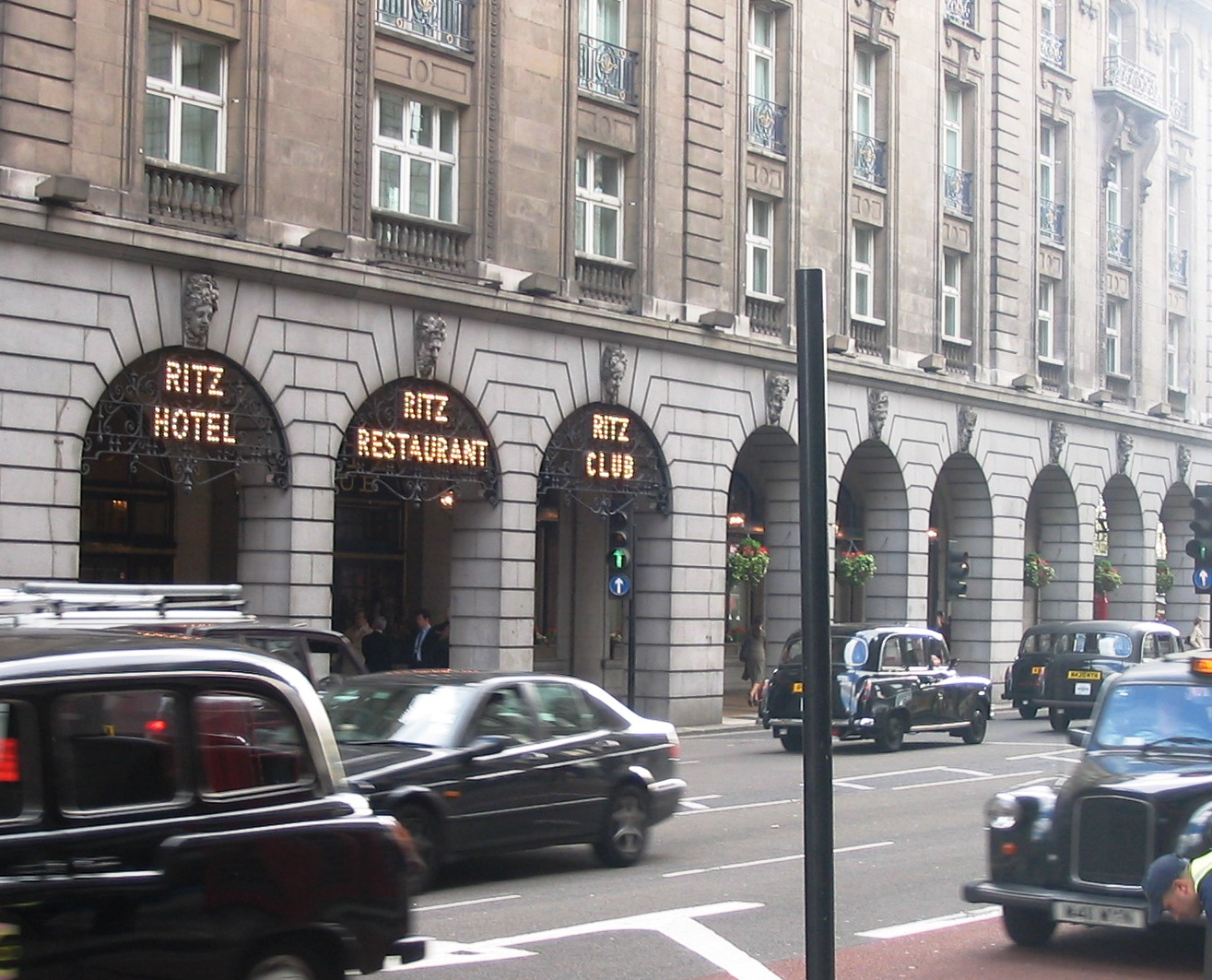
The Ritz Hotel is opposite Dover Street

Dover Street is a street in Mayfair, London. The street is notable for its Georgian architecture as well as the location of historic London clubs and hotels, which have been frequented by world leaders and historic figures in the arts. It also hosts a number of contemporary art galleries. An equestrian sculpture by Elisabeth Frink stands on the junction of Dover Street and Piccadilly, opposite the Ritz Hotel.

== Location ==
The street lies in the south of Mayfair in the West End. To the south-east, the street adjoins the major thoroughfare of Piccadilly. To the north-west, it runs up past Stafford Street to the junction with Hay Hill, then continues as Grafton Street. To the north-east is Albemarle Street, running parallel with Dover Street and the location of the Royal Institution. South-west is Berkeley Street (adjoining Berkeley Square to the north), also running in parallel.

The nearest tube station is Green Park.

== History ==
Dover Street was built by a syndicate of developers headed by Sir Thomas Bond. The syndicate purchased a Piccadilly mansion called Clarendon House from Christopher Monck, 2nd Duke of Albemarle in 1683 and proceeded to demolish the house and develop the area. At that time the house backed onto open fields and the development of the various estates in Mayfair was just getting underway. The syndicate also built Bond Street and Albemarle Street. The street is named after Henry Jermyn, 1st Baron Dover, one of the partners in the syndicate.

In June 1797 John Nash moved into 28 Dover Street, a building of his own design; he built an even bigger house next door at 29 into which he moved the following year. Edward Moxon moved from premises he had established in 1830 in New Bond Street to 44 Dover Street. He published Wordsworth from 1835 onwards and in 1839 issued the first complete edition of Shelley's poems. In 1841, he was found guilty of blasphemy for passages in Shelley's Queen Mab. Anne Lister (1791–1840), a notable Victorian landowner and diarist, liked to stay at Hawkins, located at 26 Dover Street.

Brown's Hotel (then termed a "genteel inn") was established in 1837 by James Brown, Lord Byron's valet, who took a lease on 23 Dover Street to cater for those who were in town "for the Season". He ran it with his wife, Sarah Willis, the personal maid of Lady Byron, who gave financial support. The hotel was later enlarged and joined with backing premises on Albemarle Street. In 1876, Alexander Graham Bell made the first successful telephone call in Britain from the hotel. In 1890, The International Niagara Commission met in the hotel and their decision on distributing "Niagara power" subsequently led to the adoption of the alternating current worldwide. Other guests have included Napoleon III, Theodore Roosevelt (at the time of his marriage), Rudyard Kipling and Agatha Christie (her book At Bertram's Hotel is based on Brown's).

Oliver Wendell Holmes in Our Hundred Days in Europe records staying at Mackellar's Hotel, 17 Dover Street, where "we found ourselves comfortably lodged and well cared for during the whole time we were in London".

Frédéric Chopin took lodgings in Dover Street in 1848 and performed a number of piano recitals in London and undertook piano lessons.

In the 1920s many notable photographers were based in Dover Street including Paul Tanqueray, Hugh Cecil and Alexander Bassano. Marcus Adams, Yvonne Gregory and Bertram Park, the "Three Photographers", were based at 43 Dover Street.

Green Park Underground station was originally known as Dover Street station. The original Leslie Green-designed building was located in Dover Street, but, following refurbishment in the 1930s to install escalators, the entrance was moved to Piccadilly and the station was renamed.

== Clubs ==
The street is historically and currently the location of a number of well-known London clubs, although the oldest and most fashionable London clubs are located in St James's and Pall Mall:

- The Albemarle Club, originally in Albemarle Street nearby, was relocated to 37 Dover Street before its closure.
- The Arts Club, founded by Charles Dickens and others in 1863, originally in Hanover Square, has been located at 40 Dover Street since 1893. Whistler's decision to sue John Ruskin was made on the premises. The Arts Club premises are currently used for meetings of the Eccentric Club.
- The Bath Club, where Mark Twain breakfasted.
- The Capisce Club, 1 Dover Street, was formerly a nightclub and restaurant.
- Mahiki, 1 Dover Street, is a nightclub and bar, with a Polynesian and tiki theme, predominantly specialising in rum. Often frequented by celebrities and royalty, including Prince William

And a fictional one:

- The Drones Club, the gentlemen's club of many of P. G. Wodehouse's novels, was located on Dover Street, off Piccadilly.

== Galleries ==
Art galleries in the street include:

- The Alexia Goethe Gallery, 5–7 Dover Street.
- The CCA Galleries, 8 Dover Street — originally Christies Contemporary Art, and now an independent company publishing prints.
- The Gallery at 32 Dover Street (now part of Wolf & Badger).
- Richard Green, 39 Dover Street.
- The Institute of Contemporary Arts (ICA) was initially in Dover Street, but relocated to The Mall in 1968.
- The Wapping Project Bankside, 37 Dover Street, in the same building as Mallett Antiques.
