= H&E naturist =

Monthly commercial magazine about British naturism

- April 2014 cover
- Editor: Paul Rouse
- Frequency: Monthly
- Publisher: Plant News Ltd; Hawk Editorial Ltd
- Founded: 1900
- Country: United Kingdom
- Language: English
- Website: http://www.henaturist.net
- ISSN: 0017-8888

H&E naturist (originally Health and Efficiency) is a 92-page monthly commercial magazine focusing on the naturist lifestyle, through articles on travel, health and culture, as well as various features on arts and books with a naked theme. This content and focus has sometimes caused it to be accused of appealing to consumers of pornography, although sexual nudity is absent from its pages.

== History ==
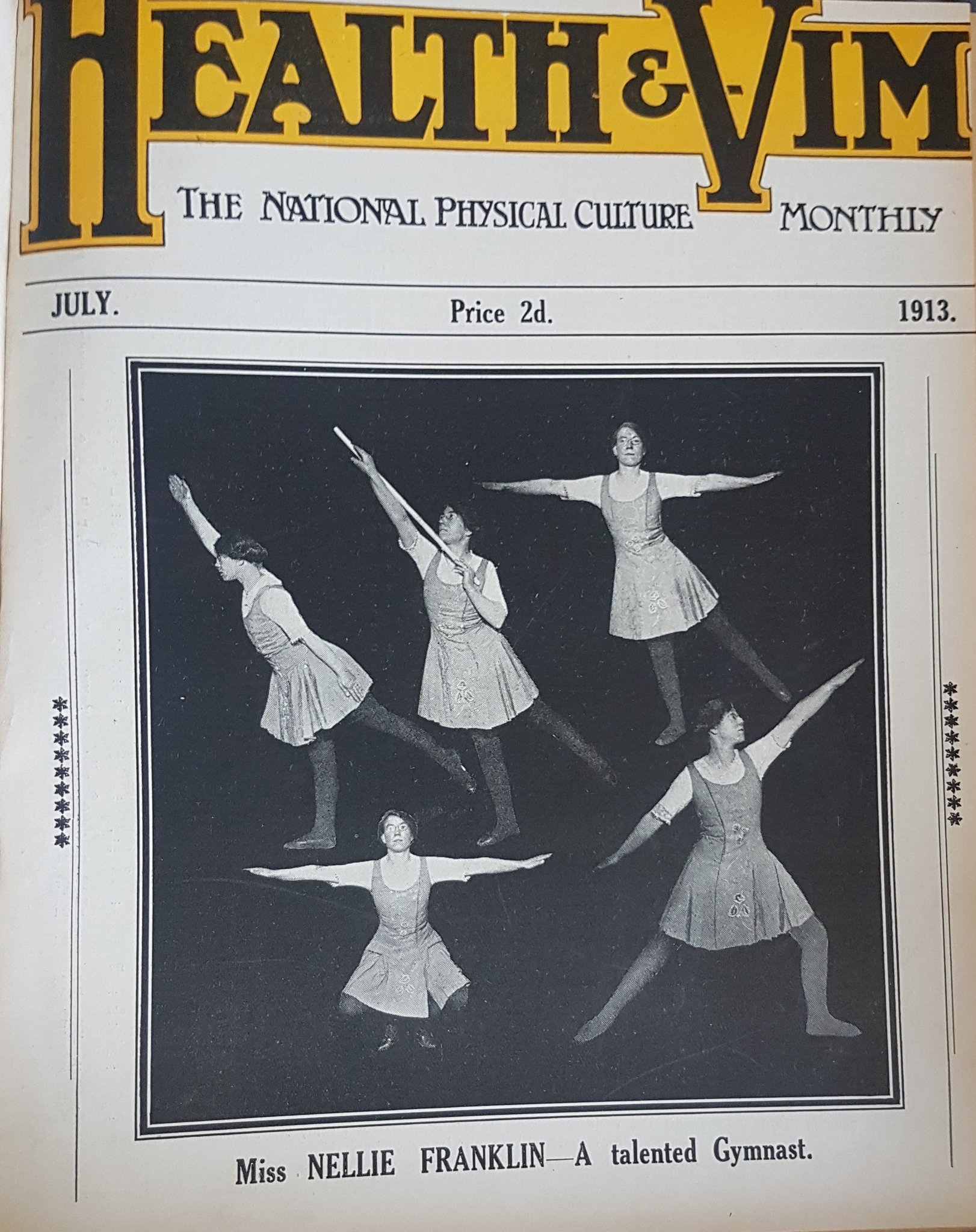
A 1913 issue of Health & Vim, a magazine which was absorbed by Health & Efficiency

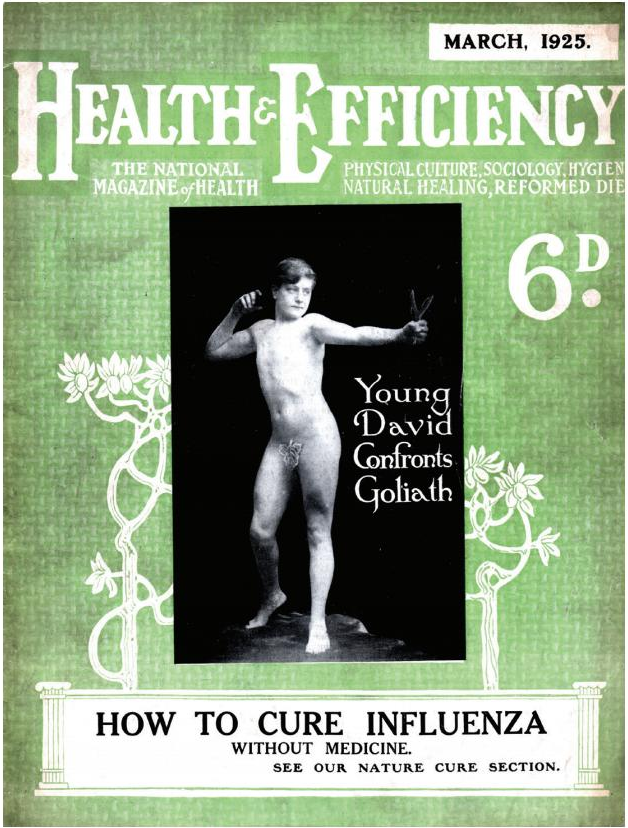
A 1925 cover of Health & Efficiency proclaiming a natural cure for influenza

For decades, Health & Efficiency claimed to have been first published in 1900. The first issue under this name was actually in 1918, when Health & Vim changed its name. That magazine probably derived from Vim, first published in 1902. These magazines covered health topics such as diet, exercise, herbalism and general advice on living a healthy and efficient life.

In the 1920s when nudists began publicising their activities and sun clubs began to form, Health & Efficiency became an early champion of their cause through publishing their letters, articles and photos. Later, this material occupied a greater proportion of the magazine, particularly as it absorbed other naturist and health periodicals, including Sunbathing and Health Magazine, with naturism becoming a main focus in the early 1930s.

After the Second World War, nudism became more popular and the monthly H&E – as it became known – promoted the lifestyle option, and throughout the 1950s and into the 1960s the magazine's reputation as the "nudist bible" grew. H&E's audience was made up of nudists who were members of British clubs and those who used British beaches. A small minority who were able to afford holidays abroad, and sampled French and Yugoslavian nudist facilities, provided H&E with the first "naturists abroad" travel reports. By the 1970s, cheaper foreign travel allowed many more British naturists to visit the south of France, Spain, Greece and Yugoslavia. H&E reflected this change and soon became an international naturist magazine providing news, travel reports, features and photography from around the naturist world.

Over its long history, notable photographers such as Walter Bird, Stephen Glass, Bertram Park and Yvonne Gregory have worked for the magazine.

The magazine has had a number of publishers and editors, and has been based in London, Epsom, Goole and Hull.

== Editorial ==
The editorial staff were anonymous before George Greenwood's tenure as editor. The magazine had a sole editor until 1991, when their editorial was restructured. Kate Sturdy became managing editor and Jane Hendy-Smith took over as editor. Additionally, several other editorial staff were added, including editors for the German and French versions of the magazine. It has since returned to a single editor.

=== Editors ===
- George Greenwood (late 1950s–early 1960s)
- Leslie Bainbridge (early 1960s–1970s)
- Murray Wren (1970s–1981)
- Susan Mayfield (1981–1983)
- Kate Sturdy (1983–1990)
- Jane Hendy-Smith (1990–late 1992)
- Kate Sturdy (late 1992–1995)
- Helen Ludbrook (1995–1998)
- Mark Nisbet (1998–2004)
- Sara Backhouse (2004–2008)
- Sam Hawcroft (2008–2022)
- Paul Rouse (2022-present)

=== Additional editorial ===
- Kate Sturdy (managing editor 1990–1995, editorial director 1996)
- Inge von Schniewind (German edition editor 1990–1996)
- Arthur Bouchard (French edition editor 1990–1996)
- Jennifer Low (editorial assistant 1991)
- Nick Mayhew-Smith (editorial assistant early 1990, assistant editor early 1992)
- Jon Williams (editorial assistant 1992, features editor late 1992–1995)
- Ruth Paley (editorial assistant mid-1993–1994)
- Jonathan Evans (sub-editor 1996)
- Helen Ludbrook (managing editor 1997, editorial director 1998)
- John Clement (art editor 1997–1998)

== See also ==
- Girl Illustrated
