= Eugene Rosenberg (architect) =

Slovak architect

Eugene (Evžen) Rosenberg (24 February 1907, in Topoľčany – 21 November 1990, in London) was a Slovak modernist architect.

== Life ==
Rosenberg was born in Topoľčany, Slovakia in 1907. He studied engineering in Bratislava, Brno, and Prague between 1920 and 1928 and architecture at the Academy of Fine Arts in Prague between 1929 and 1932 as a pupil of Josef Gočár. In between his studies in 1929 he worked with Le Corbusier in Paris and Josef Havlíček and Karel Honzík in Prague. He set up his own practice in Prague in 1934 but left Czechoslovakia for Britain in 1939 to escape the Third Reich occupation of Czechoslovakia and encouraged by his friendship with Maxwell Fry and F. R. S. Yorke. In 1940 Rosenberg was interned and sent to Australia, kept first in Hay Gaol, in New South Wales, and then in Camp Tatura, Victoria returning to London in 1942. In 1944, he established the firm Yorke Rosenberg Mardall with F. R. S. Yorke and C.S. Mardall and they were responsible for a number of innovative architectural projects such as Gatwick Airport, the John Radcliffe Hospital, Oxford and the Manchester Magistrates Court. Rosenberg spent several years following his retirement working on a book that he hoped would inspire alliances between artists and architects.

Rosenberg died in 1990. In 1992, Architect's Choice, Art in Architecture in Great Britain since 1945 was published by Thames and Hudson. Rosenberg was a collector of contemporary and twentieth century art and was passionate in promoting public art such as the Altnagelvin Hospital Mural (1959–61) by William Scott, which was commissioned by Rosenberg, the architect of this first post-war NHS Hospital in Britain, in 1958. Shortly before his death he wrote "I am committed to the belief that the artist has an important contribution to make to architecture. The bond between contemporary art and architecture is not easy to define, but I believe they are complementary – that architecture is enriched by art and that art has something to gain from its architectural setting."

== Notable buildings ==
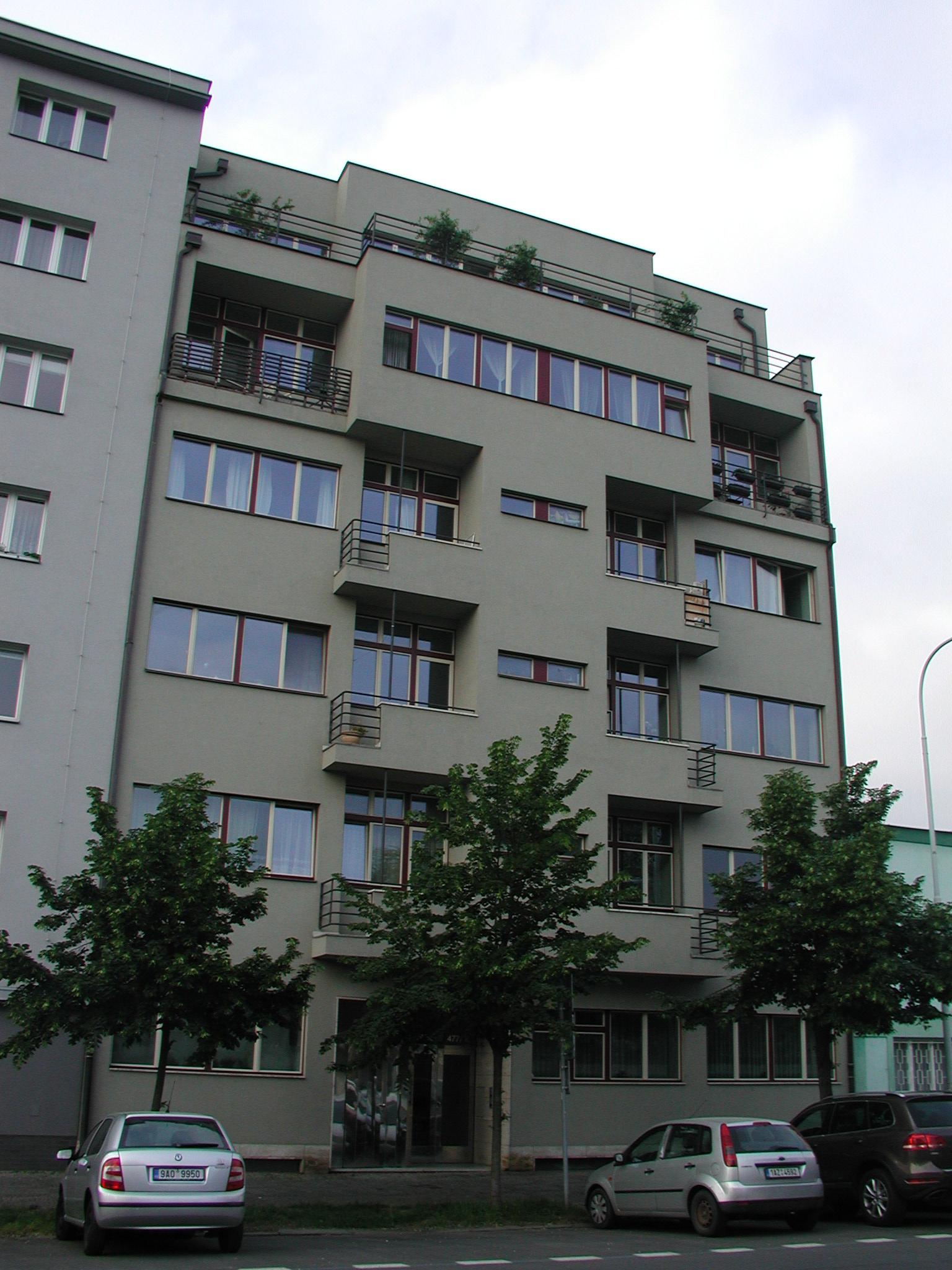
Apartment building, U Průhonu 16, Prague

- Apartment and retail units block, M. Horákové, Prague (1936)
- Apartment, with mall and retail units passage, Štepánská pasáž, Prague (1937–38)
- Sigmund Pumps Factory, Team Valley Trading Estate, Gateshead (1948)
- Sish Lane Flats, Stevenage (1952)
- Altnagelvin Area Hospital, Derry (1958–60)
- Crawley Hospital (1961)
- Hull Royal Infirmary (1962–67)
- John Lewis Warehouse, Stevenage (1963) with Felix Candela
- Belfast Synagogue (1964)
- University of Warwick (1963–66)
- St Thomas' Hospital (1966-1975)
- Wellington Hospital, London (1972)

== See also ==
- Architecture of Finland
- 1964 in architecture
- F. R. S. Yorke
- Yorke Rosenberg Mardall

== Literature ==
- Reyner Banham, The Architecture of Yorke Rosenberg Mardall, Lund Humphries, London, 1972
- Muriel Emanuel (editor), Contemporary Architects, Macmillan Press, London, 1980
- Eugene Rosenberg and Richard Cork, Architect's Choice: Art and Architecture in Great Britain Since 1945, Thames & Hudson, London 1992
- Alan Powers, In the Line of Development: FRS Yorke, E Rosenberg and CS Mardall to YRM, 1930-1992, RIBA Heinz Gallery, London, 1992
- Zdeněk Lukeš, Splátka dluhu: Praha a její německy hovořící architekti, Fraktály, Praha, 2002
- Jeremy Melvin, FRS Yorke and the Evolution of English Modernism, Wiley-Academy, London, 2003
- Ivan Margolius, Prague – A guide to twentieth century architecture, Ellipsis, London, 1996
- Oxford Dictionary of National Biography, index number 101101021/Eugene-Rosenberg
