= Phyllis Sjöström =

Phyllis Eleanor Sjöström
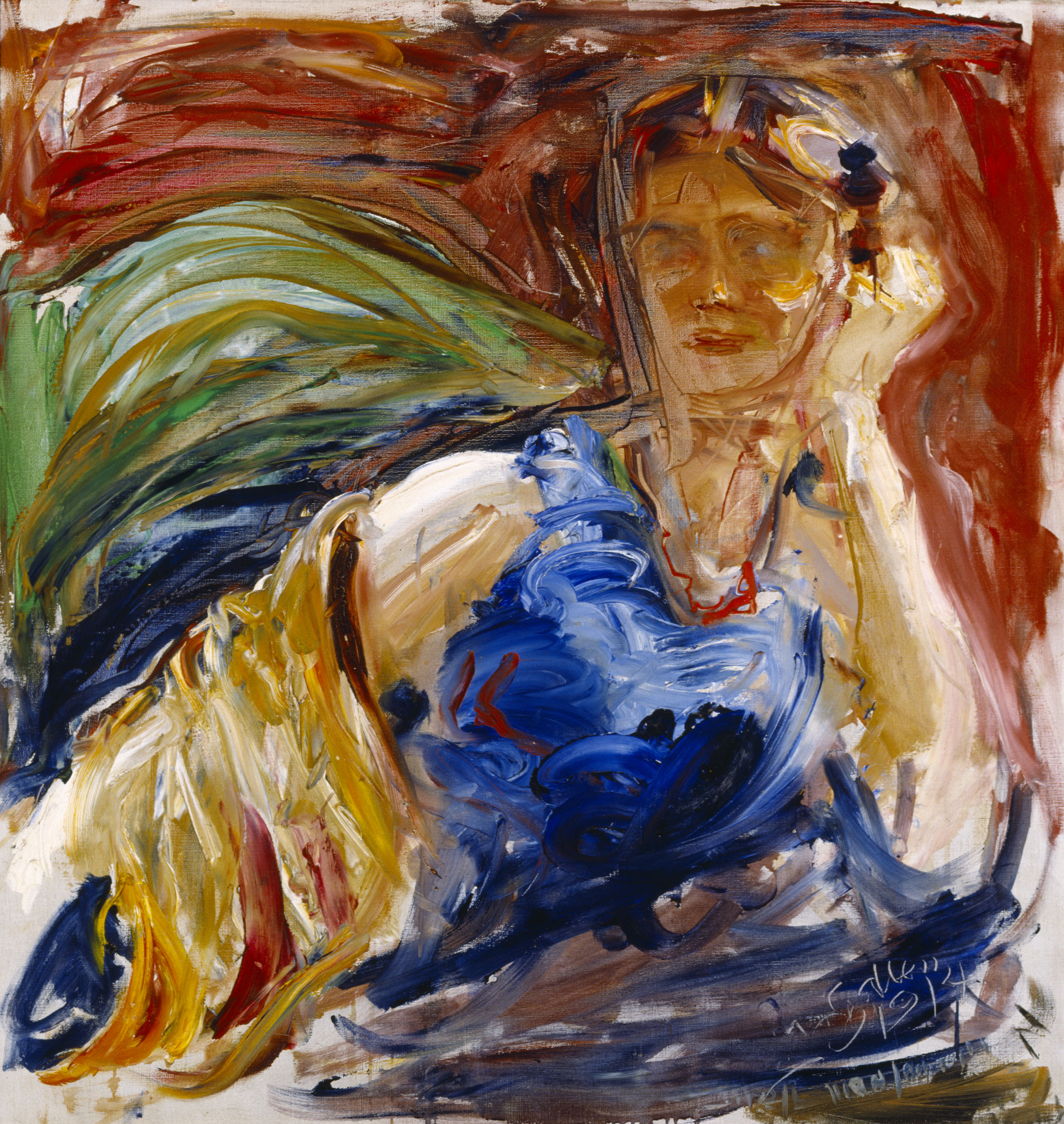
- Portrait of Phyllis Sjöström by Akseli Gallen-Kallela, 1914
- Born: Phyllis Eleanor Mardall; 1888; Darjeeling, British India
- Died: September 2, 1964 (aged 75–76); Tammisaari, Finland
- Citizenship: Finnish (until 1929)
- Occupation: Opera singer
- Spouse: Einar Sjöström
- Children: Cyril Mardall

Phyllis Eleanor Sjöström, née Mardall (1888 – 2 September 1964) was a British-born opera singer who lived in Finland until the mid-1920s.

== Life and work ==
Sjöström performed numerous soprano roles in productions by the Finnish National Theatre and the Finnish National Opera and Ballet between 1912 and 1925, including Frasquita in Carmen and Rose in Lakmé. After the death of her husband, Finnish architect Einar Sjöström, in 1923, Phyllis moved to London with her son, where she continued her singing career. In 1929, they relinquished their Finnish citizenship. Her son, Cyril Mardall, born in 1909, became a prominent architect, co-founder of the firm Yorke Rosenberg Mardall.
