= June Park (architect) =

British architect

- Born: Hilary June Park; 1920; Hampstead
- Died: 2018 (aged 97–98)
- Education: Architectural Association School of Architecture
- Occupation: Architect
- Spouse: Cyril Mardall

Hilary June Park (1920–2018) was a British architect and author known for her contributions to post-war modernist architecture and architectural writing. She worked independently and in partnership with her second husband, Cyril Mardall.

== Early life and education ==
June Park was born in Hampstead, the daughter of the renowned British portrait photographers Bertram Park and Yvonne Gregory. From 1938 she studied architecture at the Architectural Association School of Architecture in London, where she was taught by influential figures such as Felix Samuely and Frederick Gibberd.

== Life and career ==
After graduating, Park worked in the offices of Frederick Gibberd and Edward Mills, and was elected an Associate of the Royal Institute of British Architects (ARIBA) in 1944. In 1945 she established her own architectural practice. Her early works in the modernist style included a private house in Beaconsfield, Buckinghamshire (1947); two cottages for agricultural workers near Harlow and Roydon, Essex (1948); and the conversion of two houses for the Finnish Legation in Belgravia, London (1949). She also collaborated with the firm Yorke, Rosenberg & Mardall (YRM) on the design of Barclay Secondary School in Stevenage (1947).

In 1951 June Park designed a new house at 7 Fitzroy Park, Highgate, London, for herself and her second husband, Cyril Mardall, as well as a slightly smaller house (7a) adjacent, for her mother-in-law. Both were concrete framed with brick infill but have since been altered. She also designed the sauna in the basement of the Finnish Seamen's Mission and Church, London, designed by Cyril Mardall in 1958. In the 1970s and 1980s June Park and Cyril Mardall worked in partnership on residential projects in the West Indies and Ireland.

== Publications ==
June Park authored two books on modernist residential architecture:

- Houses and Bungalows (1958)
- Houses for Today (1971)

== Personal life ==
June Park's first husband was David Francis Rivers Bosanquet. On 17 January 1947 she married Cyril Mardall (formerly Sjöström), a Finnish-born British architect and co-founder of Yorke, Rosenberg & Mardall (YRM). They had one son and one daughter and lived In Fitzroy Park, Highgate, London in a house she designed. June Mardall died in 2018.
