= Girl Illustrated =

Defunct British glamour magazine

Girl Illustrated cover 1968 v2 No. 19

Girl Illustrated was a glamour magazine published in London, England by Plant News Ltd from 1966 to 1977. It was a spin-off of the naturist magazine Health & Efficiency and was notable for its high quality paper and numerous colour photographs.

Katy Manning (a Doctor Who companion) appeared naked with a Dalek prop in the August 1976 issue.
