= Bertram Park =

English photographer

Bertram Park OBE
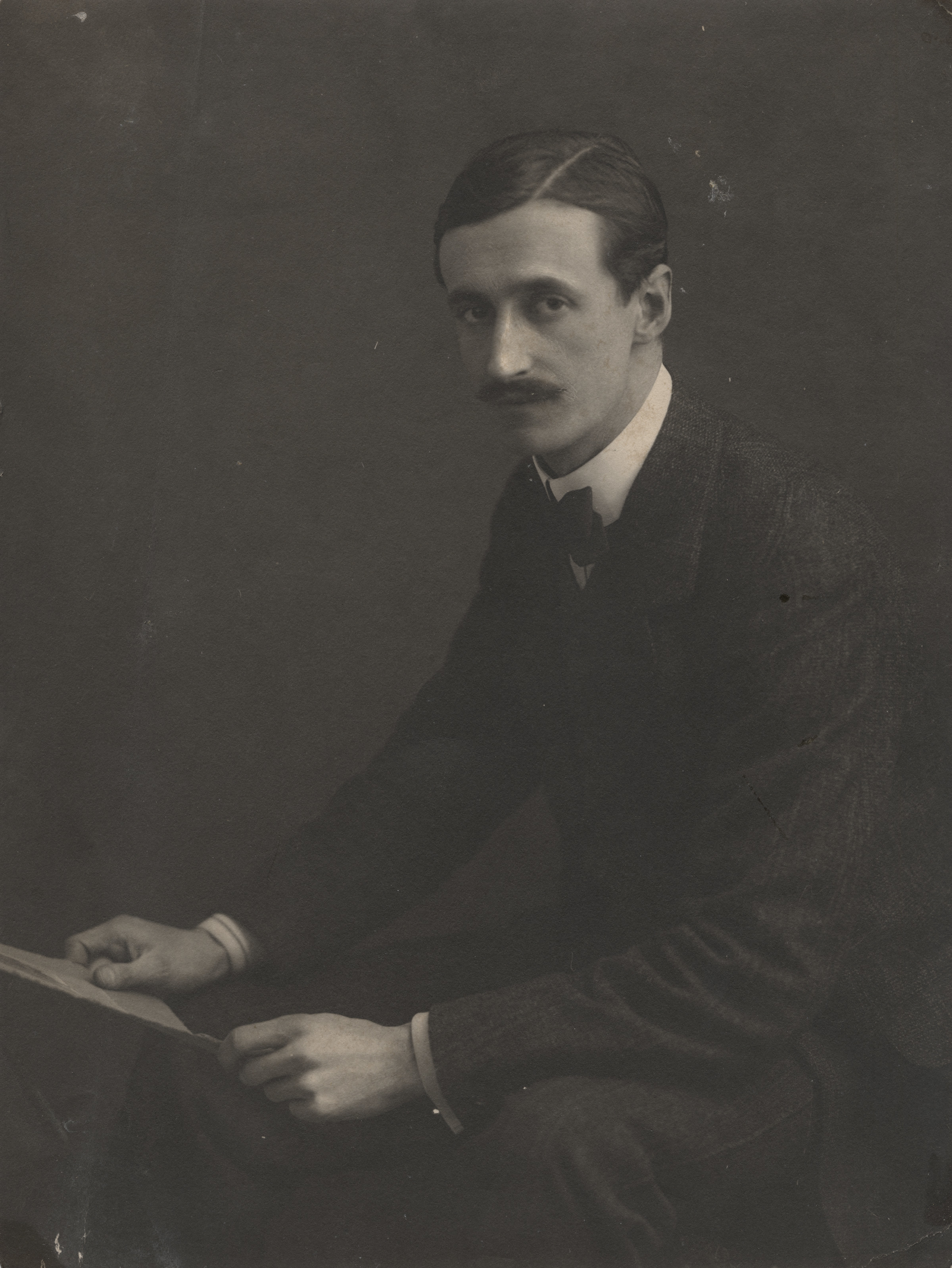
- Park c. 1910s
- Born: Bertram Charles Percival Park; 1883; Minster, Kent, England
- Died: 1972 (aged 88–89); Pinner, Middlesex, England
- Known for: Portrait photography
- Spouse: Yvonne Gregory (m. 1916; died 1970)
- Children: 1; June

Bertram Charles Percival Park OBE (1883–1972) was an English portrait photographer whose work included British and European royalty. Engravings of his photographs were widely used on British and British Commonwealth postage stamps, currency, and other official documents in the 1930s. His theatrical portraits were the source for two paintings by Walter Sickert.

With his wife Yvonne Gregory, they produced a number of photographic books of the female nude. He was an expert in the cultivation of the rose and the editor of The Rose Annual.

== Early life ==
Bertram Charles Percival Park was born in either Bloomsbury or Marylebone to Charles Percival Park and Katharine Mary Park and baptised at Minster, Kent, England, in 1883. He initially worked in the family firm which made artist's materials.

== Family ==
In 1916, Park married the photographer Yvonne Gregory (1889–1970) at Hampstead, and she became one of his principal models. They had a daughter, Hilary June Park, who was born in Hampstead in 1920. Hilary, known as June, was an architect who married David Francis Rivers Bosanquet in 1941 and divorced him in 1947. Her second marriage was to the Finnish-British architect Cyril Mardall (1909–1994) in 1947.

== Photographic career ==
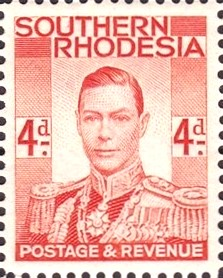
Park provided the photograph of King George VI on which this Southern Rhodesian stamp was based and for many other stamps and official documents.

In 1910, Bertram Park was one of the founders of the London Salon of Photography. In 1919, with funding from the Egyptologist Lord Carnarvon, he established studios at 43 Dover Street, London, with his wife Yvonne and the children's photographer Marcus Adams. They shared darkroom staff and facilities and were known as the "Three Photographers".

Park's work included British and European royalty and in 1927 he was made an MBE. In the 1939 Birthday Honours he was made up to OBE. His images were widely used on British and British Commonwealth postage stamps, currency, and other official documents in the 1930s.

Park and Gregory were also noted for their publicity photographs for theatrical productions. In 1924 they photographed the first English production of George Bernard Shaw's Saint Joan starring Sybil Thorndike.

In 1932, Walter Sickert produced his portrait of the actress Miss Gwen Ffrangcon-Davies as Isabella of France, ("La Louve"), directly from a Park photograph without taking any sittings with Ffrangcon-Davies, although they were closely acquainted. The source was acknowledged by Sickert in an inscription on the painting. Park's photograph was in black and white so Sickert was obliged to add colour to the painting, however, he used a restricted palette causing the critic Frank Rutter to describe the work as "practically a monochrome". Sickert also greatly enlarged the proportions, resulting in a finished work of 245 x 92 cm. Unusually, the Tate Gallery acquired the painting the same year after a fund-raising campaign to buy it for the gallery led by the Tate's director, James Bolivar Manson. Sickert joked that it was "only bought for the Tate because of Bertram Park. Another proof that honesty is the best policy".

Jessica Tandy and John Gielgud in Hamlet. Photograph by Park (1934, left) and painting by Walter Sickert (1935, right) (whereabouts unknown)

In 1934, Park and Gregory produced publicity photographs for a production of Hamlet at the New Theatre, London, one of which was the basis for Walter Sickert's 1935 painting Jessica Tandy and John Gielgud in Hamlet. In 1935 they photographed Gielgud's Romeo and Juliet in which Gielgud and Laurence Olivier exchanged the roles of Romeo and Mercutio. In 1935, Sun Bathing Review: The Quarterly Journal of the Sun Societies appointed Bertram Park as honorary art editor.

Park and Gregory's theatrical portraits form part of the University of Bristol Theatre Collection.

Park also produced a number of photographic books featuring the female nude and supplied photographs to naturist publications. This aspect of his oeuvre is discussed extensively in Annebella Pollen's 2021 book, Nudism in a Cold Climate. One of his models was the 1950s glamour model Pamela Green.

== Police career ==
Outside photography, Park was a Commandant in the Metropolitan Special Constabulary and was noted as such in 1927 and 1939 when he was appointed a Member and then an Officer of the Order of the British Empire.

== Roses ==
Park was an expert on the cultivation of the rose about which he wrote many books. He was the editor of The Rose Annual and in 1957 a review in the American Institute of Biological Sciences described his The Guide to Roses, for which he also provided the photographs, as "the last word on roses".

== Death and legacy ==
In later life, Park lived in Pinner, Middlesex, in a house whose grounds he used as a setting for his photography. He died in Pinner in 1972, leaving an estate of £103,322 net. In 1984, his daughter June presented the National Post Museum with an album of 25 pages that Park had created in the late 1940s of his photographs and the stamps based upon them.

== Selected publications ==
=== Photography ===
- Living sculpture: A record of expression in the human figure &c., Batsford, London, 1926. (With Yvonne Gregory and G. Montague Ellwood)
- The beauty of the female form, Routledge, London, 1934. (With Yvonne Gregory)
- Sun bathers: A companion volume to "The Beauty Of The Female Form": 48 photographic studies, Routledge, London, 1935. (With Yvonne Gregory)
- Curves and contrast of the human figure, Bodley Head, London, 1936. (With Yvonne Gregory)
- Eve in the sunlight, Hutchinson, 1937. (With Yvonne Gregory)
- A Study of sunlight and shadow on the female form for artists and art students , Bodley Head, London, 1939. (With Yvonne Gregory)

=== Roses ===
- Collins guide to roses, Collins, London, 1956.
- The world of roses, Harrap, 1962.
- Roses: The cultivation of the rose, National Rose Society, 1967.
- The rose annual. Multiple editions. (Editor)

== See also ==
- Dorothy Wilding
