= Walton Adams =

English photographer (1842–1934)

Walton Adams (1842–1934), also known as Arthur Walton Adams or Arthur Walter Adams, was a professional photographer working at the time when the science and art of photography was developing new techniques in Victorian Britain's "Golden Years". He took photographs of royal family members and politicians.

== Biography ==
Adams' was born in 1842 in Hampshire. He died on the 13 June 1934 aged 93, leaving six children. Walton Adams's son Marcus Adams (1875–1959) also became a photographer, including time spent photographing the royal family.

== Early career ==
The earliest references to Walton Adams's involvement in photography show him to be working in the Southampton studio of Samuel J. Wiseman (1825–1872) as an apprentice in 1861. There he met William Stilliard. In 1869 Adams and Stilliard were in partnership at 9 Bernard Street, Southampton. 'Cartes de Visite' described their business variously as the 'South of England Photographic Institution', 'Artists and Photographers' and 'Artists in Photography'. The business claimed the patronage of Queen Victoria, the Prince of Wales and Princess of Wales and the Belgian royal family. In 1882 Adams was in partnership with Robert Scanlan though this business arrangement was dissolved in 1883.

Between 1886 and his retirement in 1922, Adams ran his business from a Studio at 27 and 29 Blagrave Street, Reading, a business card for this address is held by the Reading Museum.

Photography historian S. K. May on the Southampton Victorian Photographers website speculates that Adams possibly worked with Richard Leach Maddox, the inventor of lightweight gelatin dry plates. Dr. Maddox was a medical practitioner and his interest in the possibilities of photography to aid medical practice brought him into contact with a small network of photographers in Southampton, one of which was Adams. There is a reference to Adams as the co-inventor of this process in the National Portrait Gallery's photographic archives.

== Legacy ==
An unpublished autobiographical account mentions that he photographed "about sixty thousand sitters" during his career and he singles out those whom he considered to be the most illustrious: Queen Victoria and General Charles George Gordon.

Thirteen Images attributed to Adams appear in photographic collections of the National Portrait Gallery, Examples of the work undertaken by his son Marcus and grandson Gilbert Adams also appear in the National Portrait Gallery's collections, underscoring Walton's influence. Walton's work can also be seen in the photographic collection held at the Conway Library, Courtauld Institute of Art. This collection is currently in the process of being digitised as part of a wider project 'Courtauld Connects'.
