= The Arts Club =

London private members' club

Coordinates: 51°30′29.49″N 0°8′32.02″W

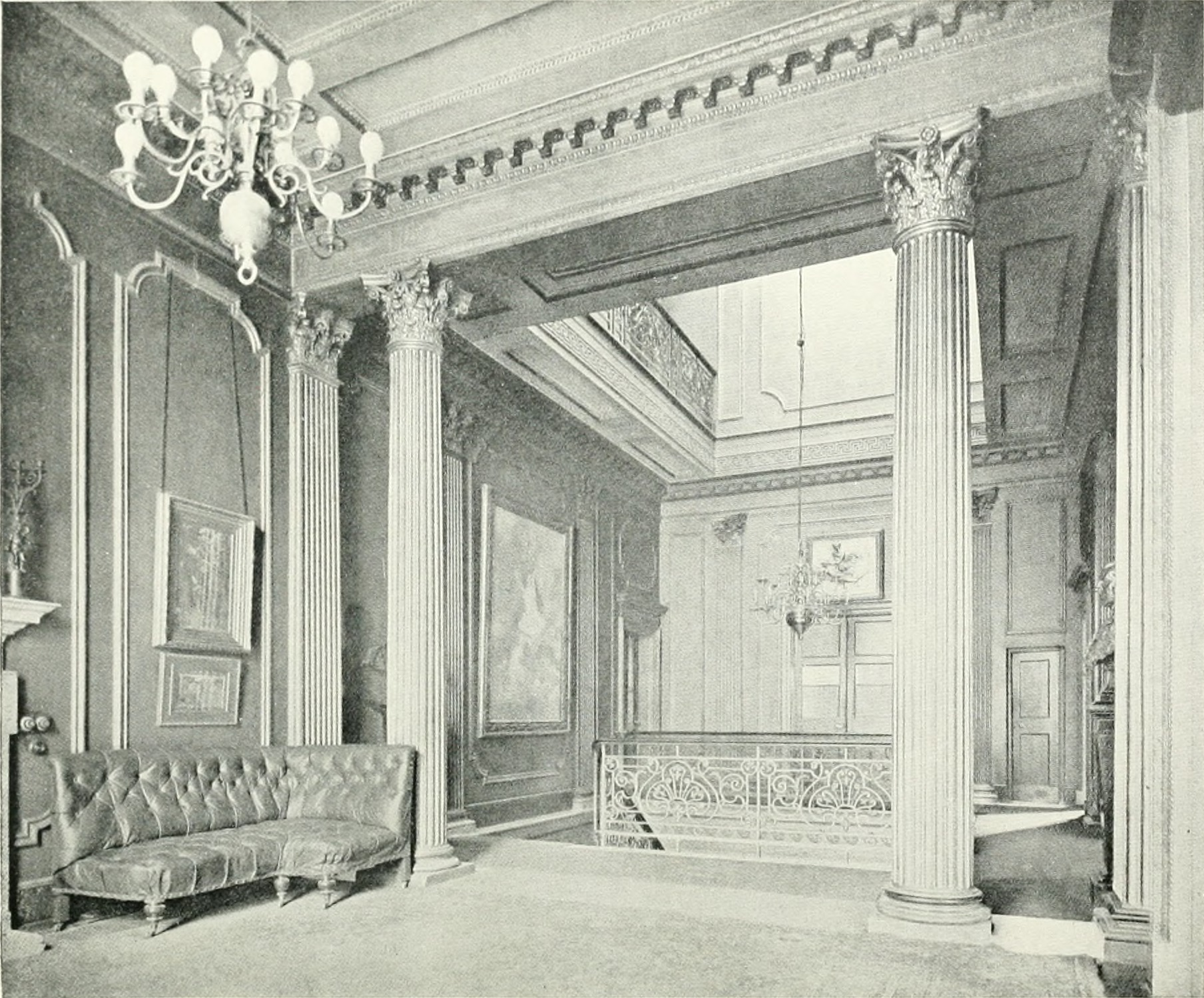
- The Club's First Floor Lobby and Staircase
- Formation: 1863
- Type: Private members' club
- Headquarters: London, England
- Location: 40 Dover Street, Mayfair, London W1S 4NP
- Fields: Arts, Literature & Science
- President: Sir Peter Blake
- Website: theartsclub.co.uk

The Arts Club is a London private members' club in Dover Street, Mayfair, founded in 1863 by Charles Dickens, Anthony Trollope, and Lord Leighton among others. It remains a meeting place for men and women involved in the creative arts either professionally or as patrons.

== History ==
In the nineteenth century members and guests included Dickens, Millais, Whistler, Kipling, Monet, Rodin, Degas and Turgenev. As early as 1891, James Whistler, one of the Arts Club's leading members, broke away to found the rival Chelsea Arts Club.

== Clubhouse ==
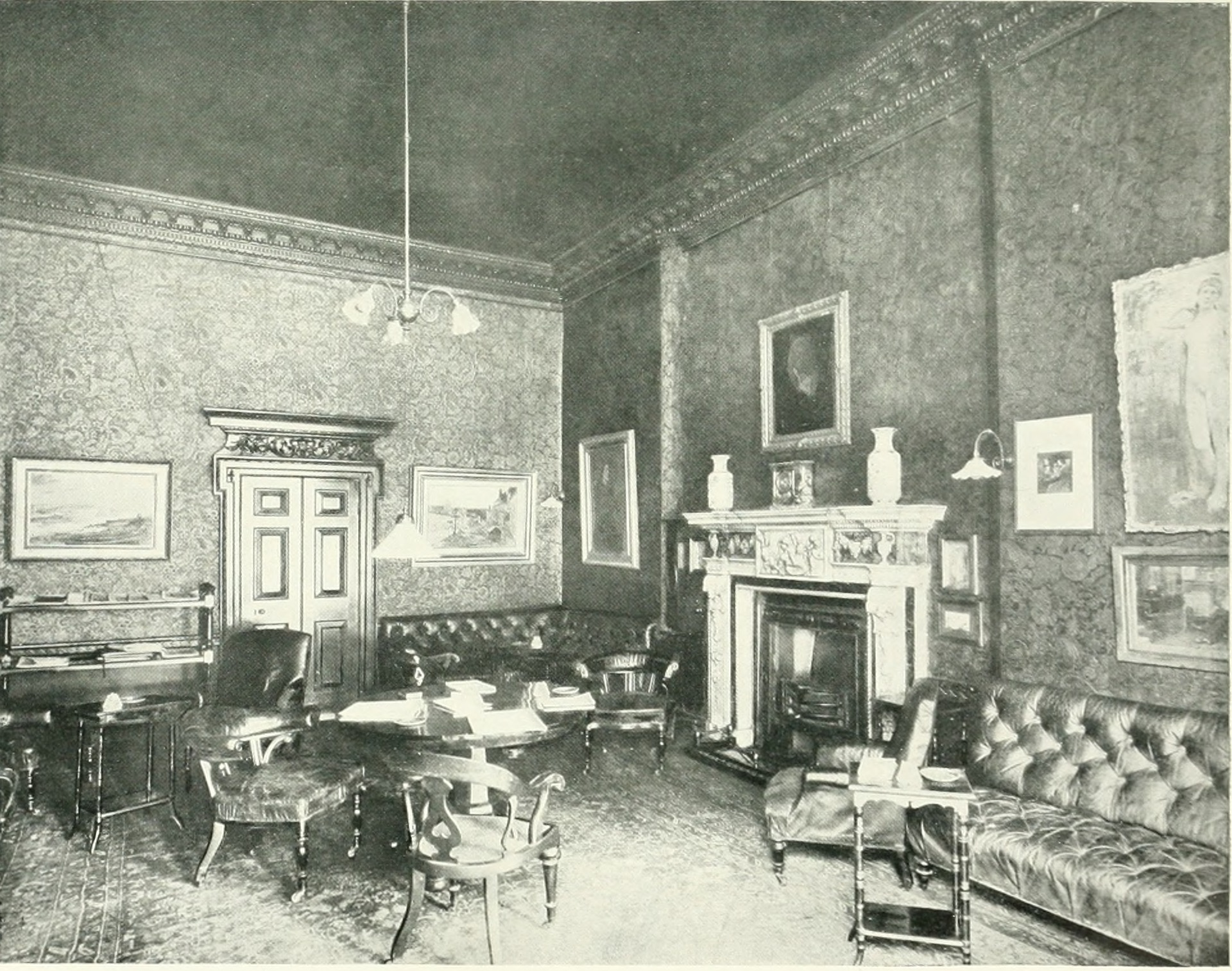
c. 1920 photograph of the club

The original club premises were at 17 Hanover Square, Mayfair. After thirty years there, the club moved nearby to its current accommodation, an 18th-century townhouse at 40 Dover Street, Mayfair, just north of the Ritz Hotel on Piccadilly, formerly the London home of the family of the Baron Stanley of Alderley. It was badly bombed in the Blitz and extensively rebuilt. In December 2020 the club opened its first international outpost in Dubai in the ICD Brookfield Place building, Ajaz Sheikh was named CEO of the Dubai Arts Club. In 2023, Mr Sheikh was named Partner and Group CEO for the Clubs.

== Membership ==
Current membership includes a number of Royal Academicians, architects, musicians, actors and writers. Prince Philip, Duke of Edinburgh was the Patron and Sir Peter Blake is the President of the Club. Current members include Grayson Perry, the photographer Tom Hunter, the actresses Gwyneth Paltrow and Kim Cattrall and also Ronnie Wood. Well known "non-artist" members have included Richard Attenborough, Matthew Parris, and Henry Blofeld.

As of 2012, the Club has no reciprocal clubs in the UK. However, a number of clubs outside the UK of similar character have reciprocal arrangements, including the Cercle de l'Union interalliée in Paris, The Arts and Letters Club of Toronto, the St. Botolph and Algonquin Clubs in Boston, the Cosmos Club in Washington DC, the Arts Club of Chicago and the Arts Club of Washington DC, and the Century Association, The Coffee House, National Arts Club and Salmagundi Club in New York.
