= Alan Powers =

British historian (born 1955)

Alan Powers (born 1955) is a British teacher, researcher and writer on twentieth-century architecture and design.

== Early life ==
Powers was raised on the borders of Hampstead Heath and in Suffolk. His father Michael was an architect member of the Architects' Co-Partnership, UK. Powers trained as an art historian at the University of Cambridge, gaining an undergraduate degree and a PhD.

== Career ==
As a writer Powers has been prolific, writing reviews, magazine articles, obituaries of artists and architects and is author of more than twenty books. He has concentrated on 20th century British architecture and architectural conservation. He has also written books on the design of book jackets, shopfronts, book collectors, and the artist Eric Ravilious as well as monographs on Serge Chermayeff, and the British firms of Tayler and Green and of Aldington, Craig and Collinge. He is joint editor of the journal Twentieth Century Architecture, published by the Twentieth Century Society, and joint series editor of the series of monographs, "Twentieth Century Architects", a collaboration between RIBA, English Heritage and the Twentieth Century Society.

Powers has curated several exhibitions, including "Modern Britain 1929–39" (Design Museum, 1999), "Serge Chermayeff" (Kettle's Yard, 2001), "Eric Ravilious" (Imperial War Museum, 2003), "Mind into Matter" (De La Warr Pavilion, 2009), "Eros to the Ritz: 100 years of street architecture" (Royal Academy, 2012/3), "Ardizzone, a retrospective" (House of Illustration, 2016–17), and "Enid Marx" (House of Illustration, 2018).

Powers was Professor of Architecture and Cultural History at the University of Greenwich, London 1999–2012. In 2011–12, Powers was awarded a Mid Career Fellowship by the British Academy to study "Figurative Architecture in the Time of Modernism", a study of non-modernist architecture in Britain. He currently teaches at the London campus of New York University and the London School of Architecture, and has served as external examiner at several schools and universities. However, he usually writes as an independent scholar.

Powers is Chairman of Pollock's Toy Museum Trust, London. He was Chair of the Twentieth Century Society 2007–2012, and remains involved in the Society's campaigns for education and conservation.

In 1982, he was elected as a member of the Art Workers' Guild and in 2020 was elected to Master. In 2008 Powers was elected to an Honorary Fellowship of the Royal Institute of British Architects (RIBA) in recognition of his standing as one of the pre-eminent experts in the history of 20th-century architecture.

Powers has published his own illustrations in magazines, especially The Spectator during the 1980s, and regularly exhibited watercolours and prints, mostly of architectural or topographical subjects. A selection are gathered in the 2018 book Alan Powers, The Art of an Art Historian.

== Selected works ==
- Taylor and Green, Architects 1938–1973: The Spirit of Place in Modern Housing, with Elain Harwood, London 1998 ISBN 978-1898465218
- Living with Pictures, Sterling Publishing, ISBN 9781840002430
- Living With Books, Sterling Publishing, ISBN 9781402742125
- Children's Book Covers: Great Book Jacket and Cover Design, Mitchell Beazley, London, 2003, ISBN 978-1-84000-693-3
- The National Trust Book of English Houses, with Clive Aslet, ISBN 9780670801756
- 2 Willow Road The History Press, London, 1996 ISBN 978-1843591252
- Serge Chermayeff: Designer, Architect Teacher RIBA London, 2001 ISBN 978-1859460757.
- Eric Ravilious: Imagined Realities, Philip Wilson Publishers, 2003. ISBN 978-0-85667-567-6.
- Twentieth Century Houses in Britain: From the Archives of "Country Life", Aurum Press, 2004. ISBN 978-1-84513-012-1.
- Modern: The Modern Movement in Britain, Merrell Publishers, 2005. ISBN 978-1-85894-255-1.
- Front Cover: Great Book Jacket and Cover Design, Mitchell Beazley, 2006. ISBN 978-1-84533-242-6.
- Britain: Modern Architectures in History, Reaktion Books, 2007. ISBN 978-1-86189-281-2.
- Art and Print: the Curwen Story, Tate, 2008. ISBN 978-1-85437-721-0
- Aldington, Craig and Collinge, RIBA Publishing, 2009. ISBN 978-1-85946-302-4
- Robin Hood Gardens Re-Visions, Twentieth Century Society, London 2010. ISBN 978-095566-871-5
- British Murals and Decorative Painting 1920–1960, London 2014 ISBN 978-1-908326-23-2
- A Musical Eye – The Visual World of Britten and Pears, Boydell Press, Woodbridge, Suffolk, 2013 ISBN 978-1-84383-886-9
- Eric Ravilious, Artist and Designer, Farnham, 2013 ISBN 978-1-84822-111-6
- 100 Years of Architecture, London 2016 ISBN 978-1-78067-823-8
- Edward Ardizzone, Artist and Illustrator, Lund Humphries, 2016 ISBN 978-1-84822-182-6
- Enid Marx, The Pleasures of Pattern, London, 2018 ISBN 978-1-84822-252-6
- Alan Powers, The Art of an Art Historian, Church Hanborough, 2018 ISBN 978-0-9955570-5-5 ISBN 978-0-9955570-6-2
- Bauhaus Goes West – Modern art and Design in Britain and America, London 2019 ISBN 978-0-50051992-9
