= F. R. S. Yorke =

English architect and author (1906–62)

Francis Reginald Stevens Yorke (3 December 1906 – 10 June 1962), known professionally as F. R. S. Yorke and informally as "Kay" or "K," was an English architect and author.

One of the first native British architects to design in a modernist style, he made numerous contacts with leading European architects while contributing to Architects' Journal in the 1930s, and in 1933 was secretary and founder member of the MARS Group. From 1935 until 1962 he was the editor of an annual publication Specification. Between 1935 and 1937 he worked in partnership with the Hungarian architect and former Bauhaus teacher Marcel Breuer, before forming the Yorke Rosenberg Mardall partnership in 1944 together with Eugene Rosenberg (1907-1990) and Cyril Mardall (Sjöström) (1909-1994), with whom he designed many post-war buildings including Gatwick Airport.

Yorke was born in Stratford-upon-Avon, where his father was also an architect, and studied architecture and planning at the Birmingham School of Architecture, where his fellow students included other notable early modernist figures including Richard Sheppard, Frederick Gibberd, Colin Penn and Robert Furneaux Jordan.

== The Modern House ==
In 1934, Yorke wrote The Modern House, a book that introduced modernist houses, fourteen pages of which were dedicated to English examples. Yorke was inspired by seeing modern architecture on his Prague visit in 1931 and initially collaborated on the book with the Czech architect Karel Honzík. He wrote a follow-up article in the Architectural Review in 1936 focusing on the use of concrete and this included a further eleven English houses. These contributions helped lay the basis for the postwar English fascination with concrete. In 1937 he published The Modern House in England which illustrated houses from a number of his fellows from the MARS group. The book was split into chapters on brick and stone, timber frame and concrete. It included a foreword by William Lethaby. Also in 1937 Yorke together with Frederick Gibberd published The Modern Flat and in 1939 with Colin Penn A Key to Modern Architecture.

== Notable buildings ==
- Torilla, a house at Nast Hyde, Hatfield (1935)
- Gane Pavilion, Bristol (1936), with Marcel Breuer
- House in High Street, Iver (1936)
- Sea Lane House, Angmering-on-Sea (1937) with Marcel Breuer - now a Grade II Listed Building.
- Shangri-la, Lee-on-the-Solent (1937), with Marcel Breuer
- Forge House, Sutton (1937)
- Houses at Eton (1938), with Marcel Breuer
- Seven cottages, Stratford-on-Avon (1939) with F.W.B. Yorke
- New House, Luccombe, Isle of Wight (1946)
- Rectory at Wootton by Woodstock, Oxfordshire (1954)
- Crawley Hospital (1959–61), with Yorke Rosenberg Mardall

== Literature ==
- Mallgrave, Harry F (2009). Modern Architectural Theory - A Historical Survey, 1673-1968. Cambridge University Press.
- Nairn, Ian; Pevsner, Nikolaus (1965). The Buildings of England: Sussex. Harmondsworth: Penguin Books. ISBN 0-14-071028-0.
- Yorke, Francis R S (1934). The Modern House. The Architectural Press.
- Yorke, Francis R S (1947). The Modern English House. The Architectural Press.
- Yorke & Gibberd, Francis R S & Frederick (1937). The Modern Flat. The Architectural Press.
- Yorke, Francis R S; Penn, Colin (1939). A Key to Modern Architecture. Blackie & Son.
- Melvin, Jeremy (2003). FRS Yorke and the Evolution of English Modernism. Wiley-Academy.
