= Torilla (house) =

House in Hatfield, Hertfordshire, England

Coordinates: 51°45′22″N 0°15′12″W

Torilla is a Grade II* listed house in Wilkin's Green Lane in Hatfield, England. It was designed in 1934–35 by F. R. S. Yorke in the modernist style and has influences from Le Corbusier's Maison La Roche. This was the first building designed by Yorke.

== Occupation and use ==
Torilla was unoccupied for several decades and became derelict. According to an article in the Independent on 19 March 1995, "the house had always been almost uninhabitable because of faults in its experimental design. The concrete walls and roof were too thin and lacked thermal insulation. Mould grew on walls and curtains and clothing rotted when it was heated because of excess condensation on cold walls." The cost of repairs to make it habitable was estimated at £400,000.

== Listing and conservation ==
According to the Independent article, Torilla had been listed in 1983 then delisted the following year when permission was given to demolish it. It was bought by a new purchaser on 11 May 1993 who intended to demolish it, but who discovered it had been re-listed the previous month, on 23 April 1993.

The architect John Winter later took on the work of conservation of the house.
