= Elisabeth Benjamin =

English architect

Rose Elisabeth Benjamin
- Born: 7 December 1908; Hendon, Middlesex, England
- Died: 29 March 1999 (aged 90)
- Education: Architectural Association
- Occupation: Architect
- Practice: Associated architectural firm[s]
- Buildings: No 1 Fitzroy Park

Rose Elisabeth Benjamin (7 December 1908 – 29 March 1999) was an English architect. She was of the first generation of women who trained as architects in the 1920s and 1930s. She designed a small number of modernist buildings and contributed towards the development of avant-garde architecture in Britain.

== Early life ==
Benjamin was born in Hendon, Middlesex, the only child of Jewish parents, Elizabeth Abadi, a suffragette, and Alfred Benjamin, a businessman. She was educated at St Paul's School in Hammersmith. In 1925, she spent six months in Paris and following this briefly attended art school in St John's Wood. She attended the Architectural Association in London from 1927 and graduated in 1932.

== Career ==
During her time at the Architectural Association, Benjamin encountered Godfrey Samuel (1927–32), a fellow student and a later founder-member of the Tecton group.

After graduating, Benjamin worked for Edwin Lutyens' office for one year. There, she worked on the font of the crypt of Liverpool Cathedral, as well as a screen for the Gaekwar of Baroda’s palace in New Delhi.

First working from home in Golders Green and then in her office 42 South Molton Street in London, Benjamin designed three houses that are known for their modernism. In Highgate, No.1 Fitzroy Park was rebuilt for Dr Edith Summerskill as a vehicle for self-presentation and Labour Party politics.

Benjamin was elected an Associate of the Royal Institute of British Architects in 1934. She was also a member of the MARS Group, an architectural think tank. She contributed to the MARS Group's section of the 'New Homes for Old' exhibition at Olympia in 1934.

In 1937, Benjamin married Joachim Gunter Nagelschmidt (1906–1901), an agricultural research chemist. She subsequently left her architectural career in order to have a family. She initially intended this to be temporary, but after the family moved to Cornwall and later to Derbyshire, she found it impossible to continue her career so far removed from London.

During the post-war years, Benjamin did some small projects, such as designing an inn sign for ’The Blue Anchor’ pub in St. Austell, Cornwall.

After her husband's death in 1981, Benjamin worked in London as a consultant for the Catholic Housing Association. She died in London on 29 March 1999.
