= Paul Tanqueray =

English photographer (1905–1991)

Paul Tanqueray (14 January 1905 – September 1991) was an English photographer.

== Biography ==
Tanqueray was born in Littlehampton, Sussex. Tanqueray first became interested in the theatre and photography when he was at Tonbridge School (1920-1923) and won the school's Photographic prize. Through his contact with an ex-pupil of the Tonbridge School Hugh Cecil, Tanqueray began his photographic career as one of his pupils.

Paul Tanqueray opened his first studio at 139, High Street, Kensington in 1925. As London's then youngest photographer, he was in a perfect position to document an era that had become obsessed with youth and modernism. During this time he employed an ex-Cambridge graduate as his assistant, Cecil Beaton, until Beaton was taken on by Vogue.

Five years of success in Kensington led to a move the more fashionable West End of London at 8, Dover Street, near the Ritz Hotel. Tanqueray's photographs appeared regularly in the weekly Sketch and Tatler and most frequently inside and on the cover of Theatre World. His work, including Ethel Mannin and his 1929 and 1933 a portraits of Anna May Wong, was also selected and hung at the annual London Salon of Photography.

During the Second World War Tanqueray worked mainly with Chelsea Home Guard. After the war he re-opened his studio at 30, Thurloe Place in South Kensington, where his 1950s famous images included Elizabeth Seal, Dame Joan Plowright, Vanessa Redgrave and actress Claire Bloom.

Tanqueray retired in 1965, and in two tranches donated his prints in 1975, and his negatives in 1983 to the National Portrait Gallery. Tanqueray died in September 1991.
