= Marcus Adams (photographer) =

British photographer (1875–1959)

Adams in 1913

Marcus Algernon Adams (15 May 1875 – 9 April 1959) was a British society photographer noted for his portraits of children.

Adams was born in Southampton, Hampshire, the son of Reading-based photographer Walton Adams. He began his career as an architectural photographer for the British Archaeological Association and took photographs for books by the antiquarian C.E. Keyser.

With fellow photographers Bertram Park and Parks' wife Yvonne Gregory, Adams formed the "Three Photographers" group in 1920. Based at 43 Dover Street, Mayfair, they each worked independently, but shared use of printing, retouching and darkroom staff.

Gaining notability for his portraits of children Adams took the first official photographs of the Duchess of York and her daughter Princess Elizabeth (the future Queen Elizabeth the Queen Mother and Queen Elizabeth II). His 1934 photograph of Princess Elizabeth at the age of 8 was used as the portrait for the $20 banknote of the 1935 Series of banknotes of the Canadian dollar. He continued his work as a photographer of royal children until a sitting with Princess Anne in 1956. Other notable children photographed by Adams included Christopher Robin Milne, John Julius Norwich and Simone Prendergast.

He joined the Royal Photographic Society in 1914 and gained his Fellowship in 1915. He was made a life Fellow in 1953 and remained a member until his death. He died in Henley-on-Thames, Oxfordshire, aged 83.

His son, Gilbert Adams (born 24 November 1906), also became a photographer and artist specialising in oil portraiture and landscapes mainly in Cornwall and Wiltshire. Gilbert assisted his father in his early career. He also joined the Royal Photographic Society in 1935, gaining his Associateship in 1935 and Fellowship in 1938.

His great grandson, Andrew Adams has followed in the family tradition and is also a professional photographer running a wedding and marine photography business in Hampshire.
