= Geoffrey Bazeley =

British architect (1906–1989)

Geoffrey Bazeley (1906 – 1989) was a British Modernist architect, born in Penzance, Cornwall into a family of shipowners and traders. In 1935, he was commissioned to build Tregannick House in Cornwall and set up his own practice there. Tregannick has been described as "one of the best Modern Movement houses in the west of England".

== Career ==
Bazeley studied architecture at the University of Cambridge (1926–29) and then at the Architectural Association in London (1929–32). He was known for his Modernist architecture.

He was first employed as an assistant to George Grey Wornum on the RIBA building on Portland Place, London W1. In 1933 he began working for the Russian-born Modernist Serge Chermayeff (who co-designed one of Britain's most iconic 1930s buildings, the De La Warr Pavilion), acting as the principal assistant for Shrub's Wood in Chalfont St Giles, Buckinghamshire.

Bazeley started his architectural practice in Penzance in 1936 and after the war opened branches in St Austell and Plymouth. He went into partnership with Peter Barbary. The firm had a very good reputation and won an award for Housing in the Isles of Scilly in 1950. They received a substantial amount of work from the War Office, and were also responsible for the cinema in Hayle, an hotel in Penzance, the Farley Building in Plymouth and the English China Clays headquarters in St Austell. Barbary died in 1970 and Portland Square was put under compulsory purchase by the Polytechnic in 1972. After this Bazeley merged into partnership with Mr Miller-Williams in Looe Street, the Barbican, Plymouth.

In 2001, Bazeley, Miller-Williams and Corfield merged with The Jonathan Ball Practice to become The Bazeley Partnership.

== Selected works ==
In 1935, he was commissioned to build Tregannick House in Cornwall and set up his own practice there. It was his first major solo commission, and it clearly shows how he had imbibed the lessons of both Serge Chermayeff and his partner, Erich Mendelsohn. Bazeley’s later projects included the modernisation of the Seaton Barracks in Plymouth, offices for the ECL group in St Austell, and the new See House for the Bishop of Truro.
