= Cyril Mardall =

- Born: Cyril Leonard Sjöström; November 21, 1909; Helsinki, Finland
- Died: June 1, 1994 (aged 84); London, United Kingdom
- Citizenship: Finnish (1909 - 1928); British (from 1929)
- Occupation: Architect
- Known for: Finnish Seamen's Church, London; University of Warwick buildings
- Spouse: June Park
- Parent(s): Einar Sjöström and Phyllis Eleanor née Mardall

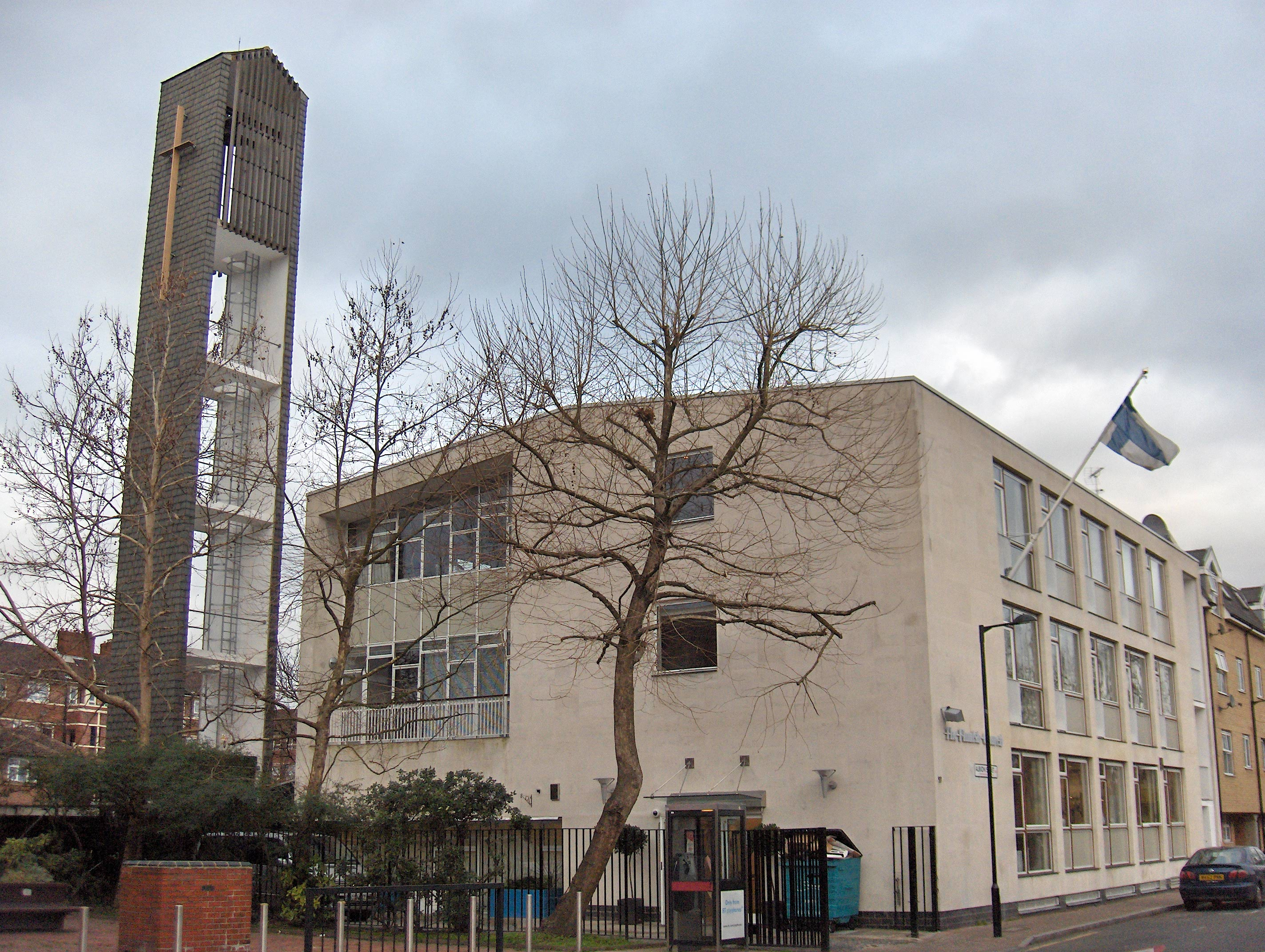
The Finnish Seamen's Church in London, completed in 1958.

Cyril Leonard Sjöström Mardall (21 November 1909 – 1 June 1994) born Cyril Leonard Sjöström was a Finnish-born British modernist architect. In Finland, he is best known for the Finnish Seamen's Church in London, completed in 1958, which he began designing before World War II. During his career, Mardall designed many schools and educational institutions, including buildings for the University of Warwick and Southwark Library in London.

== Life and career ==
Cyril Sjöström was born in Helsinki to architect Einar Sjöström and English opera singer Phyllis Eleanor Sjöström née Mardall. He studied at the Nya Svenska Läroverket (New Swedish School) in Helsinki and moved to London with his mother in the mid-1920s after his father's death. In England he began using his mother's maiden name Mardall as his surname, and obtained British citizenship in 1928. In 1929, he relinquished his Finnish citizenship.

In London, he studied architecture at the Northern Polytechnic from 1927 to 1931 and won a scholarship to the Architectural Association School of Architecture, where he received his diploma in 1932.

After graduating, Mardall returned to Finland to work for architect Ole Gripenberg on a design for the 1940 Helsinki Olympic Games stadium which won second place. He moved back to London in 1933, establishing his own architectural practice and designing prefabricated timber-framed houses, some of which were manufactured in Sweden and exported to the UK. During this time, he also began teaching at the Architectural Association.

During World War II, Mardall served as an intelligence officer in the Royal Naval Volunteer Reserve until 1944, when he was seconded to the United Nations Relief and Rehabilitation Administration.

In 1944, Mardall founded the architectural firm Yorke Rosenberg Mardall with F. R. S. Yorke and Eugene Rosenberg. Yorke, Rosenberg & Mardall offices were established in London and later in Hong Kong, Singapore, Nigeria, Cairo, Egypt, and Sydney, Australia. In the late 1950s, Mardall assisted Finnish-American architect Eero Saarinen during the construction phase of the United States Embassy in London. Later, he actively promoted cultural connections between Finland and Britain. Mardall retired from the company in 1975. The firm is today part of RMJM.

From the mid-1970s onwards, he designed buildings in Ireland and the Caribbean in partnership with his wife June Park (1920–2018). Cyril Mardall died in London on 1 June 1994.

== Notable works ==
- Finnish Seamen's Church, London (1958)
- Barclay Secondary School, Stevenage, Hertfordshire (1950)
- Queensmead Secondary Modern School, Ruislip, Middlesex (1953)
- Gatwick Airport, Surrey (1958–88)
- University of Warwick buildings (1960s)
- St Thomas' Hospital, London (1966-75)
- Hull Royal Infirmary, Yorkshire (1967)
- Magistrates Courts, Manchester (1971)
