= Crawley Hospital =

- Sussex Community NHS Trust
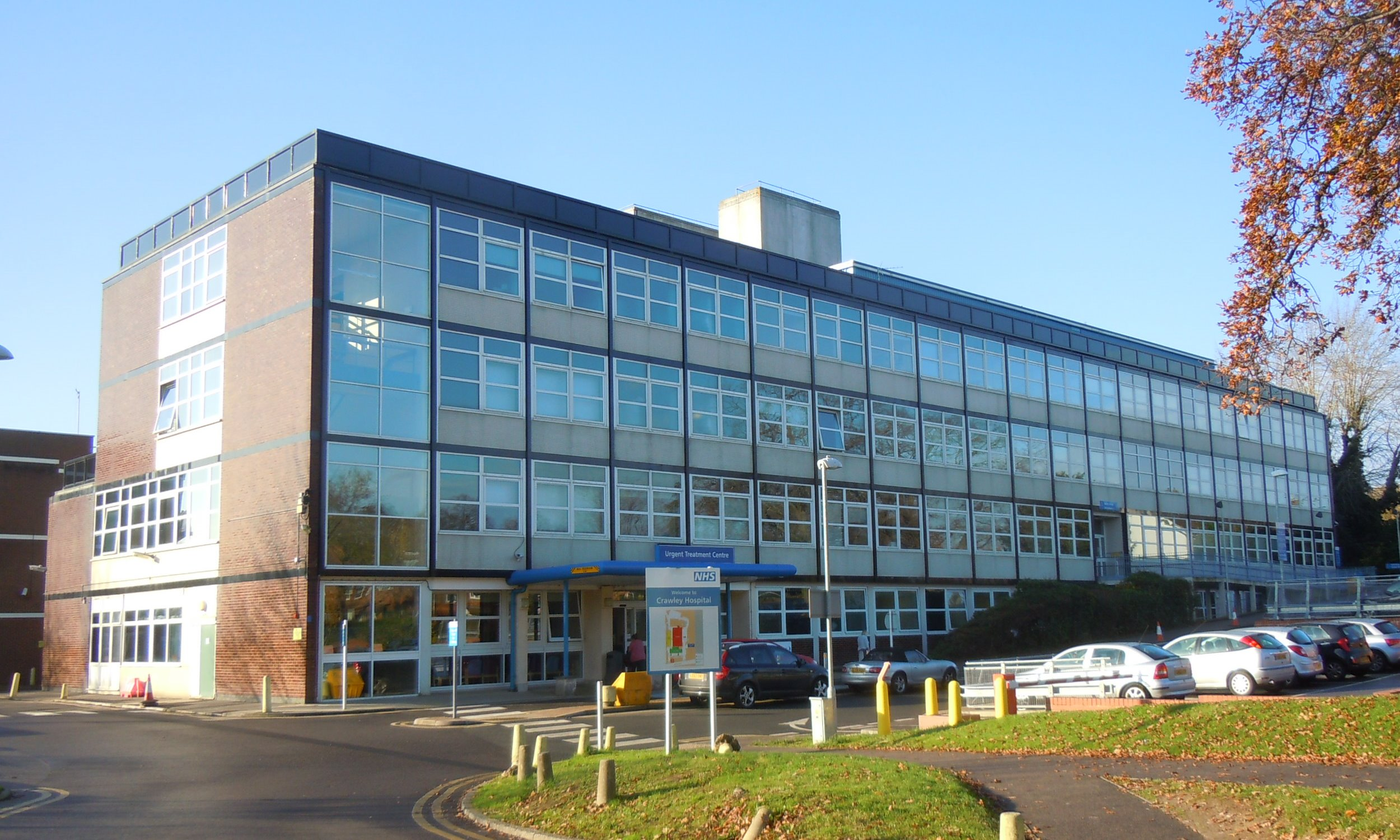
- The Green Wing with the Urgent Treatment Centre entrance on West Green Drive

- Shown in Crawley

Geography
- Location: West Green Drive, West Green, Crawley, West Sussex, England, United Kingdom
- Coordinates: 51.116606°N 0.197443°W

Organisation
- Care system: National Health Service
- Type: General
- Affiliated university: None
- Patron: None

Services
- Emergency department: No Accident & Emergency
- Beds: 143

History
- Founded: 1961 (present building)

Links
- Lists: Hospitals in England

Crawley Hospital is a National Health Service hospital in Crawley, a town and borough in West Sussex, England. Since 2006 it has been part of the Sussex Community NHS Trust, which has overall management responsibility. Surrey and Sussex Healthcare NHS Trust also provides some services. The hospital is located in the West Green neighbourhood of Crawley, near the town centre.

== History ==
Crawley grew slowly as a small market town until the Second World War. Until 1896, the only medical treatment available was offered in Horsham, 7 miles (11 km) away, under the provisions of the various Poor Laws. A cottage hospital with six beds was established that year; by 1913 it had been extended to a nine-bed facility, and there were 12 beds and an operating theatre in 1922. The hospital was paid for by public donations and fundraising; patients paid as much as they could afford for treatment.

These premises became too small, and a new "district hospital" was established at Ifield Lodge in West Green—then a mostly residential area west of Crawley High Street—in the 1930s. In 1947, Crawley was selected as one of the sites for the Government's proposed New Towns—planned communities designed to accommodate people moved out of London, which was overcrowded and war-damaged. The master plan allocated land in the southeast of the development area for a large new hospital, and the 1930s facility was expected to be demolished. Both Crawley Urban District Council (the forerunner of the present Borough Council) and Crawley Development Corporation (the body responsible for planning and developing the New town) supported this proposal, but the regional health authority preferred building a new hospital on the existing site. A public inquiry upheld this demand in 1958, and construction work on a new building started the following year.

The first part of the building was completed in 1961 or 1962. Extensions were built between 1966 and 1970 and in 1981.

Originally, a full range of services was provided: outpatient care, an Accident and Emergency department and a maternity unit. Funding cuts and the opening of a new hospital in nearby Haywards Heath affected the hospital's status, however, and for a period during the 1990s it was threatened with closure. In 1998 the NHS Trust responsible for the hospital merged with that of East Surrey Hospital in Redhill, Surrey, which was developed as the main facility: services such as Accident and Emergency provision and maternity care were concentrated there over the next few years, and Crawley was downgraded to "sub-acute" status. By 2004, however, the Trust had provided services for cancer patients and children, and in July that year a new 24-hour "Walk-in Centre" was opened, offering an inferior level of service to the former Accident and Emergency department. This was changed in 2007 to an Urgent Treatment Centre. In 2008, paediatric surgery was moved to East Surrey Hospital.

An ambulance station was built in 1963 on Exchange Road in Crawley town centre. It had moved to West Green by the 1980s, and is now operated by the South East Coast Ambulance Service.

== Architecture ==
The Yorke Rosenberg Mardall architectural partnership, led by F. R. S. Yorke and noted for its Modernist hospital designs, received the commission for the hospital. Architectural historian Nikolaus Pevsner, writing in 1965, praised the building, describing it as "easily the best building in Crawley up to date". It is a three- to four-storey reinforced concrete structure clad with dark steel, white tiles, red glazed bricks and large areas of glass.

== See also ==
- Healthcare in Sussex
