= Hugh Cecil =

British photographer (1889–1974)

Hugh Cecil Saunders
- Born: 14 December 1889; Kingston upon Thames, England
- Died: March 1974; Brighton, England
- Other names: Hugh Cecil
- Education: Tonbridge School, Queens' College, Cambridge
- Occupation: Photographer
- Known for: Portrait photography; official photographs of Edward VIII and George VI

Hugh Cecil Saunders (14 December 1889 – March 1974, Brighton) was an English photographer of the 1910s, 1920s and 1930s, who practised under the name of Hugh Cecil.

== Biography ==
Hugh Cecil Saunders was born in Kingston upon Thames to Frederick Atkinson Saunders and his wife, Mary Ann Roberta Walton. He was educated at Tonbridge School and Queens' College, Cambridge.

At the Cambridge Photographic Society, he exhibited a number of landscapes, some of which won medals.

After graduation, Saunders became an apprentice to the Sevenoaks photographer H. Essenhigh Corke. In 1912 he moved to London and, dropping his surname, set up as a professional portrait photographer at 100 Victoria Street. He married Kathleen Fairchild Huxtable in December 1918 in her home town of Tunbridge Wells.

Hugh Cecil's work appeared in the weekly The Sketch, Tatler and Bystander magazines, and his reputation as a fashionable photographer grew. Cecil moved to 8 Grafton Street in 1923 — designing and furnishing an elaborately decorated studio, he often used patterned backdrops and lit the subject using soft reflected light. Cecil Beaton said he was influenced by the style of Adolph de Meyer.

His portraits at the time included Gertrude Lawrence, and, in 1925, the then-Prince of Wales, later Edward VIII, sat for him. He took the official photographs for postage stamps for Edward VIII.

In 1926 Cecil published his Book of Beauty, consisting of 37 photogravures accompanied by selected verses. Some of the unnamed subjects were actresses Juliette Compton, Justine Johnstone and Edna Best, and socialites Lady Diana Cooper and Lady Georgiana Curzon. Cecil Beaton published his own Book of Beauty in 1930, possibly influenced by Hugh Cecil.

He exhibited regularly at the London Salon of Photography, and works appear in the annual Photograms of the Year between 1914 and 1928. Cecil had at least two pupil/assistants who established successful careers, Paul Tanqueray, who had also attended Tonbridge School, and Angus McBean, whose work Cecil noticed when exhibited near his gallery at a tea-room named the Pirate's Den. McBean later claimed that he took many of his sittings in the mid-1930s. The studio continued until the Second World War, and the official photographs of King George VI were taken there.

Cecil later experimented with the photographic machine that became the basis of the photo booths that can be used to obtain instant identity photographs for passports and other official documents. He died in Brighton in 1974; a number of his negatives were acquired by the National Portrait Gallery after a house clearance.
