= Gane Pavilion =

Temporary building near Bristol (1936)

Coordinates: 51.4479°N 2.6446°W

The Gane Pavilion, also known as Gane's Pavilion, the Gane Show House and the Bristol Pavilion, was a temporary building constructed in 1936 at Ashton Court near Bristol in England. It was primarily designed by the modernist architect and furniture designer Marcel Breuer, with F. R. S. Yorke as the architectural consultant.

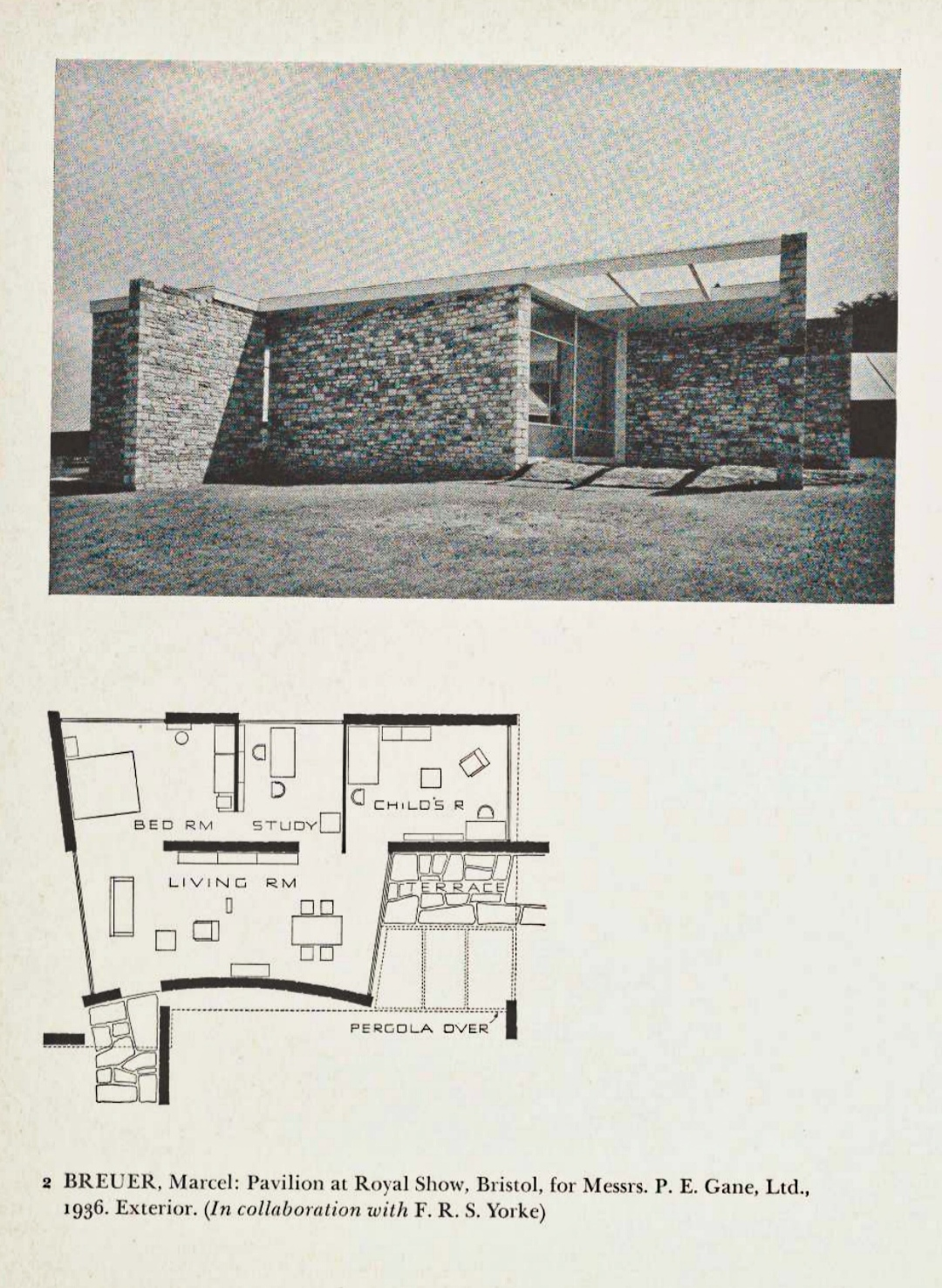
Gane Pavilion, Bristol (1936) – exterior and floor plan

== History ==
After leaving Germany, Breuer spent 1935–37 working in London for the Isokon company, and in partnership with Yorke. At this time Crofton Gane was the proprietor of P. E. Gane, a Bristol furniture manufacturing company. He became interested in modernist design and gained an introduction to Breuer via Isokon's proprietor, Jack Pritchard. Breuer redesigned Crofton Gane's own house in Bristol. Gane commissioned the pavilion as a showroom to display his range of products at the 1936 Royal Show, which that year was held at Ashton Court. The five-day event opened on 30 June 1936.

The pavilion was designed by Breuer, with Yorke participating in a collaborative or consultative capacity. By contrast, Breuer and Yorke are clearly cited as co-designers on other projects of the same period, such as Sea Lane House in Angmering-on-Sea (1936), demonstrating that joint attribution was applied when both architects genuinely collaborated. A flat-roofed building with planes of local stone and glass walls, its interior was finished with plywood. The pavilion's importance for modernism lay in innovations such as use of exposed stone for the walls, and the walls' arrangement in a free pattern allowing interior and exterior spaces to flow into each other. The pavilion's design was a precursor of some of Breuer's subsequent achievements in America. Breuer later stated that it was one of his two favourite works, along with the UNESCO Headquarters building in Paris.

== See also ==
- Barcelona Pavilion (Ludwig Mies van der Rohe, 1929)
