= Yvonne Gregory =

British photographer (1889-1970)

- Yvonne Gregory by Bertram Park, 1919
- Born: 1889
- Died: 1970 (aged 80–81)
- Known for: Photography
- Spouse: Bertram Park (m. 1916)

Yvonne Gregory (1889–1970) was a British society photographer.

== Career ==
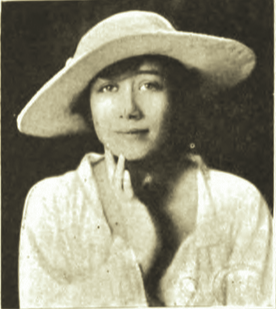
Yvonne Gregory Park (1916)

Gregory married fellow photographer Bertram Park in 1916. Gregory, Park and Marcus Adams established themselves as the "Three Photographers" and based their collective studio at 43 Dover Street in Mayfair. Their studio was initially funded by the Egyptologist George Herbert, 5th Earl of Carnarvon. Gregory and Park would collaborate on works, and Gregory would also pose for Park. She joined the Royal Photographic Society in 1926 and gained her Associate the same year and Fellowship in 1928. She also exhibited regularly in RPS exhibitions.

Park and Gregory published several books together including 1935's The Beauty of the Female Form. The book arose from work they had produced for the first international photographic salon, held in Paris in 1933. Gregory, with and without Park, published extensively in nudist and naturist books and magazines from the 1930s onwards, a subject discussed in detail in Annebella Pollen's 2021 book, Nudism in a Cold Climate.

== Personal life ==
Gregory and Park had a daughter, June Park who became an architect.

== Selected publications ==
With Bertram Park

- Living sculpture: A record of expression in the human figure &c., Batsford, London, 1926. (With G. Montague Ellwood)
- The beauty of the female form, Routledge, London, 1934.
- Sun bathers: A companion volume to "The Beauty Of The Female Form": 48 photographic studies, Routledge, London, 1935.
- Curves and contrast of the human figure, Bodley Head, London, 1936.
- Eve in the sunlight, Hutchinson, 1937.
- A Study of sunlight and shadow on the female form for artists and art students , Bodley Head, London, 1939.
