= Yorke Rosenberg Mardall =

Architectural firm

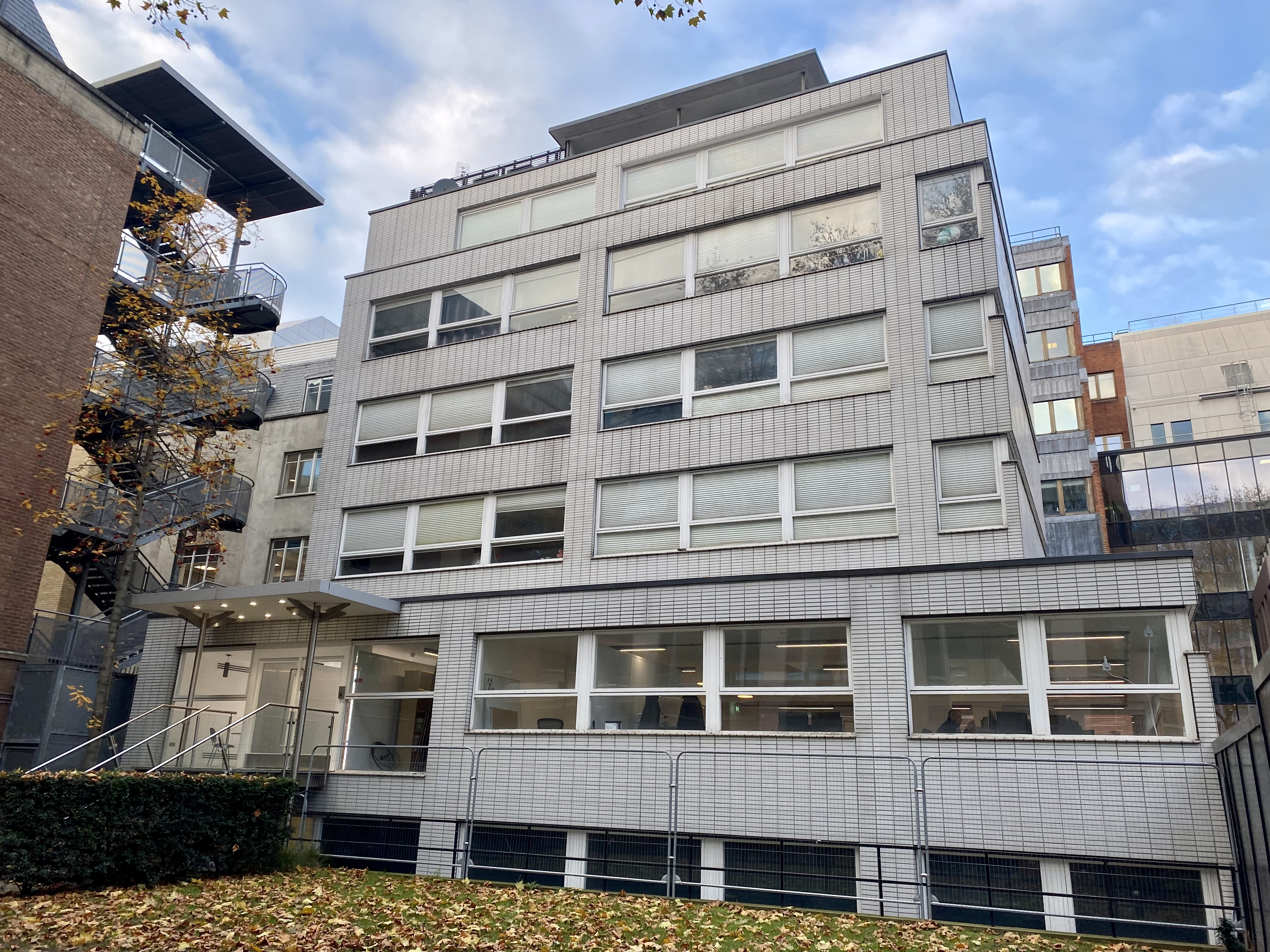
The former offices of Yorke Rosenberg Mardall, Greystoke Place

Yorke Rosenberg Mardall (Yorke, Rosenberg and Mardall, YRM) was a British architectural firm established by F. R. S. Yorke (1906-1962), Eugene Rosenberg (1907-1990) and Cyril Mardall (Sjöström) (1909-1994) in 1944.

== History ==
The international character of this modernist firm was created by Rosenberg, born in Slovakia and who practised architecture in Prague before the Second World War, and Mardall, born in Finland, as well as by the number of staff from all parts of the world. Their most notable trademark was the use of white ceramic tiles for the treatment of external façades inspired by Le Corbusier's use of tiles on the entrance drum of the Armée de Salut (1929) in Paris and the General Pensions Institute (1929–34) in Prague designed by Josef Havlíček and Karel Honzík and worked on by Rosenberg. Their main field of work was hospitals, schools, colleges, offices and industrial buildings as well as Gatwick airport.

David Allford became a partner in 1958, becoming joint senior partner in 1975. The company was floated on the stock market in 1987 as YRM plc, with David Allford as chairman.

In 2011 the company was sold to RMJM.

== Notable projects ==
- Queensmead School (formerly Queensmead Secondary Modern School) (1953)
- Gatwick Airport (1958–88)
- YRM Offices, Greystoke Place, London (1961)
- Crawley Hospital (1961)
- Keddies Store, Southend (1963)
- Liverpool University Electrical Engineering Building (1965)
- University of Warwick (1966)
- Hull Royal Infirmary (1967)
- Control and Briefing Building, Newcastle Airport (1967)
- Cottam power stations (1969)
- Luton Airport Britannia Airways Hangar (1970)
- Manchester Magistrates Courts (1971)
- Sizewell B (1971–95)
- John Radcliffe Hospital Oxford (1972)
- WD & HO Wills Tobacco Factory, Hartcliffe, Bristol, Head Office (with Skidmore Owings & Merrill) 1972
- Lynemouth power station (1972)
- St Thomas' Hospital (1966-1975)
- YRM Offices, Britton Street, London (1976)
- Alied Dunbar Centre Swindon (1980)
- Humana Hospital London (1982)
- 2–8a Rutland Gate

== Literature ==
- The Architecture of Yorke Rosenberg Mardall, Lund Humphries, London 1972.
- Alan Powers, In the Line of Development: FRS Yorke, E Rosenberg and CS Mardall to YRM, 1930-1992, RIBA Heinz Gallery, London, 1992
- Jeremy Melvin, FRS Yorke and the Evolution of English Modernism, Wiley-Academy, London, 2003
- Ivan Margolius, Honzík and Yorke: How a Czech Architect Became the Prime Mover in the Ascent of Modern Architecture in Great Britain, The British Czech and Slovak Review, Winter 2017, no. 157, pp. 6 – 7.
