= Tizard =

Tizard (also Tizzard) is a surname. Notable people with the surname include:

== Tizard ==
- Barbara Tizard (1926–2015), British psychologist and academic
- Bob Tizard (1924–2016), New Zealand politician
- Catherine Tizard (1931–2021), New Zealand mayor and Governor-General
- Henry Tizard (1885–1959), English chemist and inventor
  - Tizard Committee
  - Tizard Mission
- Jack Tizard (1919–1979), New Zealand research psychologist
  - Tizard Learning Disability Review, journal on learning and intellectual disabilities
- Judith Tizard (born 1956), New Zealand politician
- Peter Tizard (1916–1993), British paediatrician
- Richard Henry Tizard (1917–2005), British engineer
- Thomas Henry Tizard (1839–1924), English oceanographer
  - Tizard Bank, part of the Spratly Islands in the South China Sea
  - Mont Tizard, a mountain in Kerguelen, Southern Indian Ocean

== Tizzard ==
- Colin Tizzard (born 1956), British racehorse trainer
- James Tizzard (born 1982), English cricketer
- Ken Tizzard (born 1969), Canadian rock bassist
- Will Tizzard (born 2002), English footballer
