= Sheila Haywood =

British landscape architect

Sheila Mary Haywood
- Born: 19 August 1911; Chittagong, British India
- Died: 8 August 1993 (aged 81); Hindhead, Surrey
- Occupation: Landscape Architect

Sheila Mary Haywood, ARIBA, FILA (née Cooper; 19 August 1911 – 8 August 1993) was a British landscape architect. An early female landscape designer in Britain, she was one of the early identifiers of the recreational potential of extractive industry sites.

== Biography ==
Haywood was born in Chittagong, Bengal, in 1911. Her parents were Ellen (born Rita) and Arthur John Cooper, a railway official on the Assam Bengal Railway. The family returned to the UK in 1921. Haywood attended Cheltenham Ladies’ College from 1927–1929. She trained as an architect at the Architectural Association in London from 1929–1934. On 27 January 1940, she married John Mason Haywood, a solicitor.

From 1939–1949 Haywood was employed as an assistant to the landscape architect Geoffrey Jellicoe and she worked with him on a number of his major projects. It was during this time that her interest began to turn towards landscape architecture and she set up her own practice in 1949. That same year she was appointed landscape architect to Bracknell New Town and remained in this role until 1974. She was consultant landscape architect for English China Clays where projects included John Keay House (now Cornwall College) in St Austell (1964–1966). Working also as consultant landscape architect to Associated Portland Cement Manufacturers, Tunnel Portland Cement (now Hanson Cement) and the Central Electricity Generating Board., she soon became an expert in the extractive industries as a whole. She also took over from Geoffrey Jellicoe as landscape consultant to the Hope Cement Works in Derbyshire (now Breedon Hope), continuing in this role until 1980.

In 1959, Haywood drew up the landscape master plan for Churchill College, Cambridge, working alongside the architect Richard Sheppard, whose practice had won a national competition to build a College in honour of Sir Winston Churchill. Her association with the College continued until 1974. Other work in Cambridge included the New Addenbrooke’s Hospital site (1958–1962) and Wolfson College (1974–1980).

Haywood was elected a Fellow of the Institute of Landscape Architects in 1956. She served as its Honorary Vice-President for many years and was an active member on its Council and other committees. Her focus throughout her career was on the development and improvement of her profession as a whole.

While much of Haywood's work can still be identified in her other projects, the grounds of Churchill College, Cambridge, and her work at the Hope Cement Works in Derbyshire, are extensive and lasting examples of her work.

== Written work ==
- Crowe S, Haywood S, Jellicoe S and Patterson G (1972), The Gardens of Mughul India, London, Thames and Hudson
- Haywood, S M (1974), Quarries and the Landscape, 10 November 1974, London, BQSF
