= Alfred Keogh =

British doctor (1857–1936)

Lieutenant-General Sir Alfred Keogh GCB GCVO CH FRCP
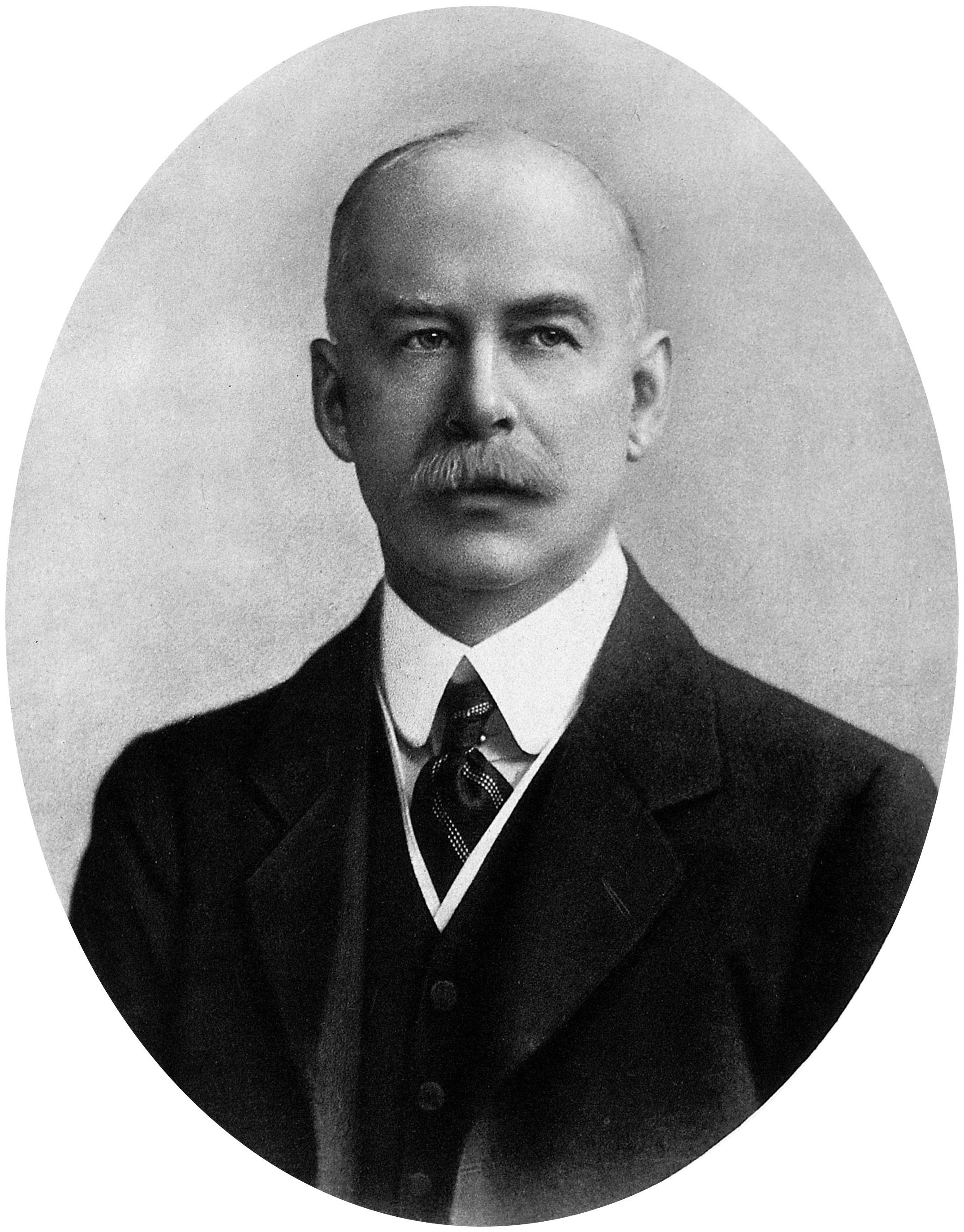
- Born: 3 July 1857; Dublin, Ireland (then part of the United Kingdom of Great Britain and Ireland)
- Died: 30 July 1936 (aged 79); London, United Kingdom
- Military career
- Allegiance: United Kingdom
- Branch: British Army
- Service years: 1880–1910; 1914–1918
- Rank: Lieutenant-General
- Commands: Director-General Army Medical Services; No. 3 General Hospital
- Conflicts: Second Boer War; First World War
- Awards: Knight Grand Cross of the Order of the Bath; Knight Grand Cross of the Royal Victorian Order; Member of the Order of the Companions of Honour; Knight of Grace of the Venerable Order of Saint John; Grand Officer of the Order of the Crown (Belgium); Grand Officer of the Legion of Honour (France); Grand Officer's Cross of the Order of the White Eagle (Serbia)
- Other work: Rector of Imperial College London (1910–22)

Lieutenant-General Sir Alfred Henry Keogh, GCB, GCVO, CH, FRCP (3 July 1857 – 30 July 1936) was an Irish medical doctor in the British Army. He served as Director-General Army Medical Services twice; from 1905 to 1910 and 1914 to 1918.

== Early life ==
Keogh was born in Dublin on 3 July 1857 to Henry Keogh, a barrister and magistrate of Roscommon. He was educated at Queen's College, Galway, and Guy's Hospital, London. He received his Doctor of Medicine (MD) degree from the Queen's University of Ireland in 1878.

Upon graduation, he moved to London to undertake his house officer placements. He served as a house physician at the Brompton Hospital for Diseases of the Chest, and as a clinical assistant at the Royal Westminster Ophthalmic Hospital.

== Military career ==
On 2 March 1880, Keogh was commissioned into the Army Medical Services as a surgeon-captain. His first posting was as a surgeon to the Royal Arsenal, Woolwich. On 6 March 1892, he was promoted to surgeon-major. With the outbreak of the Second Boer War in 1899, he was posted to South Africa. He was promoted to lieutenant-colonel on 6 March 1900, and became commander of No. 3 General Hospital near Cape Town. During the war, he served in Cape Colony, the Orange Free State, and the Transvaal Republic.

In January 1902, following his return from the Second Boer War, he was appointed Deputy Director-General of the Army Medical Services. He was promoted to colonel on 2 December 1904. On 1 January 1905, he was appointed Director-General Army Medical Services and promoted to lieutenant-general. He led the reform of the Army Medical Services in response to the Haldane reforms of the Territorial Forces in 1907; this included the introduction of the Territorial Force Nursing Service. He retired from the military on 6 March 1910.

With the outbreak of the First World War, he was reappointed DGAMS on 3 October 1914. He supervised the huge expansion of the Army's medical services to cope with the war, and was in command of the medical services in the UK. He left the appointment and the military in June 1918.

== Later life ==
He was appointed Rector of Imperial College London and served from 1910 to 1922.

He died at 10 Warwick Square, London, on 30 July 1936. A requiem mass was held at Westminster Cathedral. He was buried in the Marylebone Cemetery, Finchley.

== Honours and decorations ==
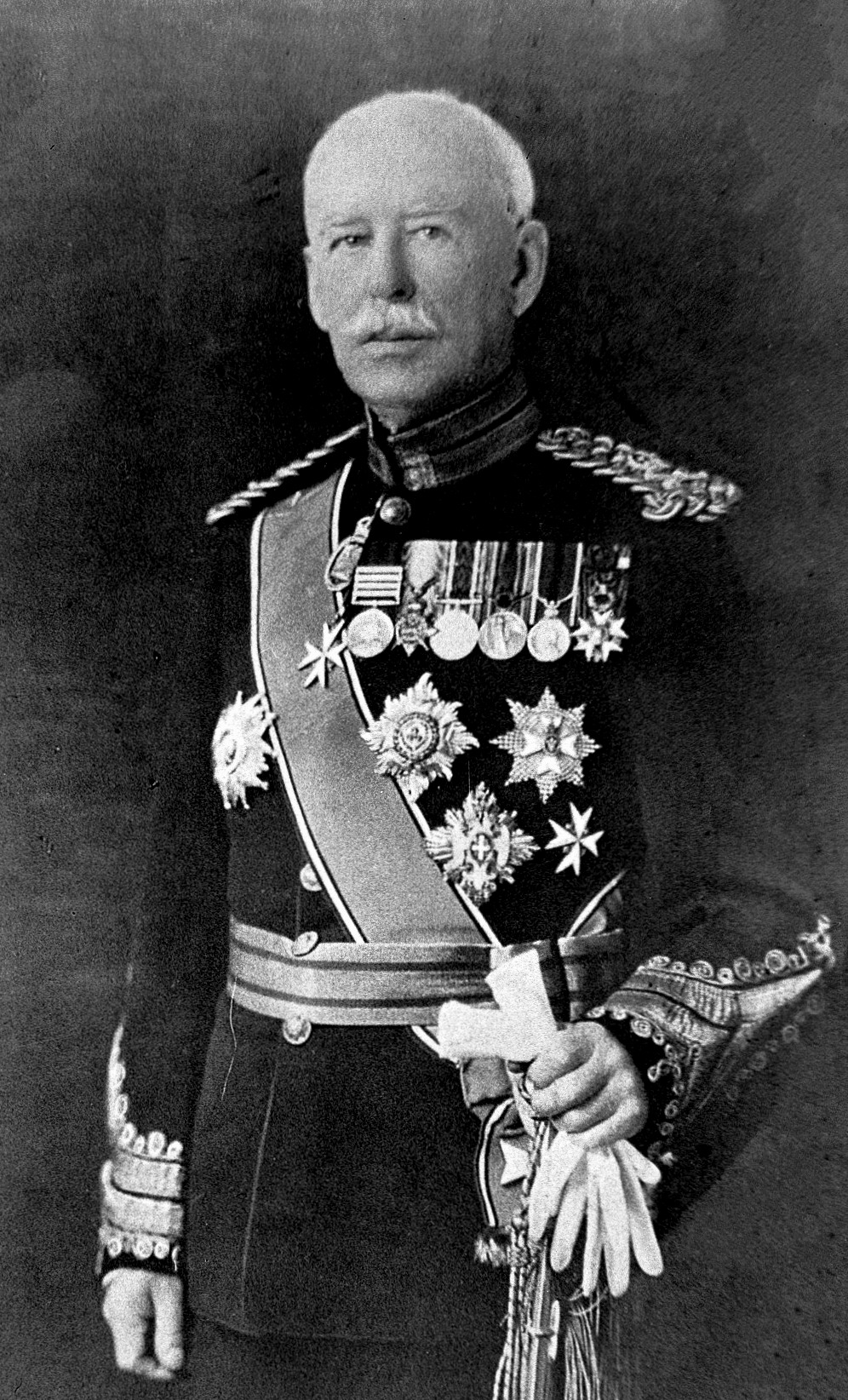
Sir Alfred Henry Keogh, c. 1919

On 29 November 1900, he was appointed Companion of the Order of the Bath (CB) in recognition of services in the campaign in South Africa, 1899 to 1900. On 7 May 1903, he was appointed a Knight of Grace of the Venerable Order of Saint John (KStJ). He was promoted to Knight Commander of the Order of the Bath in the 1906 King's Birthday Honours. On 24 July 1907, he was appointed Honorary Physician to the King (KHP). He was promoted to Knight Grand Cross of the Order of the Bath (GCB) on 24 January 1917 'for services rendered in connection with [WWI]'. He was appointed to the Order of the Companions of Honour (CH) on 25 February 1918 'for services in connection with the war'. In the 1918 King's Birthday Honours, he was appointed Knight Grand Cross of the Royal Victorian Order (GCVO).

He was a recipient of a number of foreign honours. In 1917, he was appointed Grand Officer of the Order of the Crown by the King of the Belgians, and Grand Officer of the Legion of Honour by the President of France. In 1918, he was awarded the Order of the White Eagle, 2nd Class by the King of Serbia.

He received the Queen's South Africa Medal with four clasps in 1901.

=== Legacy ===
- The Keogh Platoon is named in honour of Sir Alfred Keogh, who is enshrined in the history of the Royal Army Medical Corps (RAMC).
- The Keogh Barracks at Mytchett, Surrey, was also named in Sir Alfred Keogh's memory.
- Keogh Hall, a hall of residence at Imperial College, London, is named in his honour.

Military offices
Preceded by Unknown	Director-General Army Medical Services; 1905–1910	Succeeded by Sir William Gubbins
Preceded by Sir Arthur Sloggett	Director-General Army Medical Services; 1914–1918	Succeeded by Sir John Goodwin
Academic offices
Preceded by Henry Bovey	Rector of Imperial College London; 1910–1922	Succeeded by Thomas Holland
