= Péninsule Jeanne d'Arc =

Peninsula of Grande Terre, an island in southern Indian Ocean

Coordinates: 49°41′S 70°00′E

Topographic map of the Kerguelen Archipelago showing the peninsula in the south-east (lower right)

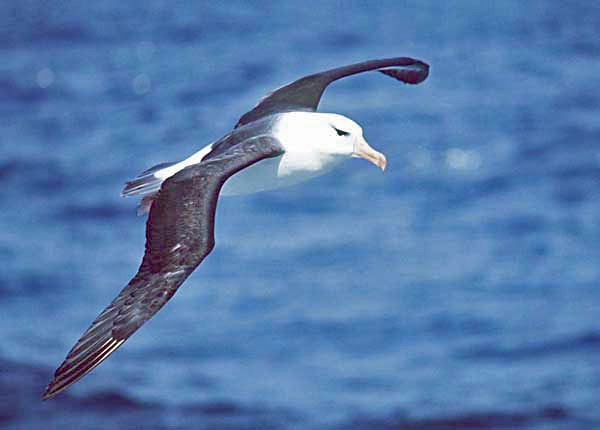
The peninsula holds an important breeding colony of black-browed albatrosses

Péninsule Jeanne d'Arc (French pronunciation: [penɛ̃syl ʒan daʁk]), also known as Presqu'île Jeanne d'Arc, (Joan of Arc Peninsula in English) is a peninsula of Grande Terre, the main island of the subantarctic Kerguelen archipelago in the southern Indian Ocean. 844 metres (2,769 ft) high Mont Tizard is the highest point of the peninsula.

== Description ==
The peninsula occupies the south-eastern corner of Grande Terre, to which it is connected by the narrow, 350-metre (1,150 ft) wide Haulage des Swains isthmus at its north-west end, and by the similarly narrow Haulage des Naufragés isthmus to Presqu'île Ronarc'h towards the eastern end of its north coast. It is about 38 kilometres (24 mi) long from west to east and 12 kilometres (7.5 mi) wide. Port Jeanne d'Arc is the site of an abandoned Norwegian whaling station at the western end of the peninsula's north coast that is subject to a cultural heritage conservation program.

== Important Bird Area ==
The southern coast of the peninsula has been identified as a 120-square-kilometre (46 sq mi) Important Bird Area (IBA) by BirdLife International because of its breeding seabirds. It consists largely of cliffs that rise steeply from the shore to a height of over 800 metres (2,600 ft). To the east, a large glacial valley opens into the Baie de l’Antarctique. With the exception of the Canyon des Sourcils Noirs, at the eastern end of the site, which is regularly visited by scientists monitoring a study population of black-browed albatrosses, human presence is rare.

At least 21 species breed in the IBA. Some 3,000 pairs of southern rockhopper penguins nest along the base of the cliffs, with about 2,500 pairs of gentoos and 130,000 pairs of macaronis. Kerguelen's only population of sooty albatrosses is found at the Canyon des Sourcils Noirs, together with the 1,300 pairs of black-brows. Other birds breeding in the site include northern giant petrels, Kerguelen terns, light-mantled albatrosses, white-chinned petrels and Kerguelen shags.
