= Richard V. Southwell =

British mathematician

Richard Southwell
- Born: Richard Vynne Southwell; 2 July 1888; Norwich
- Died: 9 December 1970 (aged 82)
- Education: Trinity College, Cambridge
- Awards: Timoshenko Medal (1959); Elliott Cresson Medal (1964); Fellow of the Royal Society
- Scientific career
- Fields: Mathematics
- Workplaces: University of Oxford; Imperial College London
- Doctoral students: Leslie Fox; Olgierd Zienkiewicz

Sir Richard Vynne Southwell, FRS (2 July 1888 – 9 December 1970) was a British mathematician who specialised in applied mechanics as an engineering science academic.

== Education and career ==
Richard Southwell was educated at Norwich School and Trinity College, Cambridge, where in 1912 he achieved first class degree results in both the mathematical and mechanical science tripos. In 1914, he became a Fellow of Trinity, and a lecturer in Mechanical Sciences.

Southwell was in the Royal Naval Air Service during World War I. After World War I, he was head of the Aerodynamics and Structures Divisions at the Royal Aircraft Establishment, Farnborough.

In 1920, he moved to the National Physical Laboratory. He then returned to Trinity College in 1925 as Fellow and Mathematics Lecturer in 1925. Next, in 1929, he moved to Oxford University as Professor of Engineering Science and Fellow of Brasenose College. Here, he developed a research group, including Derman Christopherson, with whom he worked on his relaxation method. He became a member of a number of UK governmental technical committees, including for the Air Ministry, at the time when the R100 and R101 airships were being conceived.

Southwell was Rector at Imperial College, London from 1942 until his retirement in 1948. He continued his research at Imperial College. He was also involved in the opening a new student residence, Selkirk Hall.

== Scientific contribution ==
As a scientist, Southwell developed relaxation methods for solving partial differential equations in engineering and theoretical physics during the 1930 and the 1940s. The equations had first to be discretised by the finite difference methods. Then, the values of the function of the grids would have to be iteratively adjusted so that the discretised equation would be satisfied. At the time, digital computers did not exist, and the computations had to be done by hand. Southwell developed various techniques to speed up the calculations. For instance, in 1935, he used multiple grids for that purpose, a technique which would later be elaborated into the multigrid method.

== Honours ==
Southwell received the following honours and recognition for his achievements:

- Professor at University of Oxford (1925)
- Fellow of the Royal Society (1925)
- Worcester Reed Warner medal, ASME (1941)
- Member of the National Academy of Sciences (1943)
- Timoshenko Medal (1959)
- Elliott Cresson Medal (1964)

Southwell was also honoured with a knighthood.

== Publications ==
- Stress Calculation in Frameworks by the method of relaxation of constraints Proc. Roy. Soc. A 151, 56 (1935); Proc. Roy. Soc. A 153, 41 (1935).
- Relaxation methods in engineering science : a treatise on approximate computation (Oxford Univ. Press – 1940)
- An Introduction to the Theory of Elasticity for Engineers and Physicists, 2nd ed. London: (Oxford University Press, 1941)
- Relaxation Methods in Theoretical Physics, a continuation of the treatise, Relaxation methods in engineering science (Oxford University Press – 1946)

Academic offices
Preceded by Sir Henry Tizard	Rector of Imperial College London; 1942–1948	Succeeded by Sir Roderic Hill
