= List of presidents of Imperial College London =

Highest academic official at Imperial College London

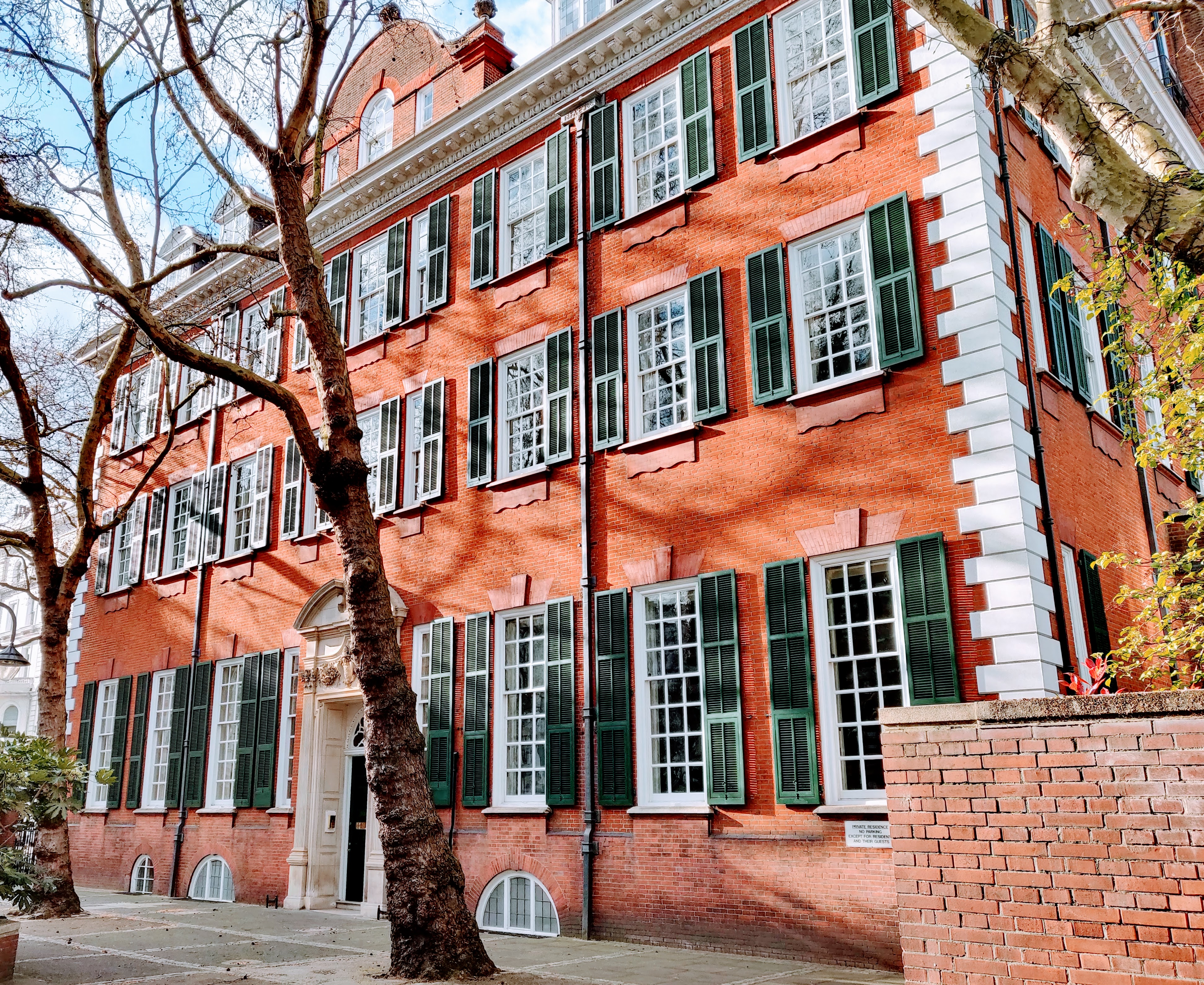
170 Queen's Gate, the President's ex officio residence

The president of Imperial College London is the highest academic official of Imperial College London. The president is the chief executive and is elected by the council of the college and chairman of the senate. The position is currently held by Hugh Brady, who succeeded Alice Gast in August 2022.

In 2012 the responsibilities were separated into two posts, the president & rector (later simplified to president) whose duty is to "promote Imperial's position as a global university" and provost who is "responsible for advancing and delivering the College's core academic mission - education, research and translation." From 2013, Alice Gast served as president & rector, while James Stirling became the first provost of Imperial College London in August 2013.

The president's residence is a large house on Queen's Gate, at the southwest corner of the college's campus in South Kensington, London.

== List of rectors ==
- 1908 Henry Bovey
- 1910 Alfred Keogh
- 1922 Thomas Henry Holland
- 1929 Henry Tizard
- 1942 Richard Southwell
- 1948 Roderic Hill
- 1954 Patrick Linstead
- 1966 Owen Saunders (Acting Rector)
- 1967 William Penney
- 1973 Brian Flowers
- 1985 Eric Ash
- 1993 Ronald Oxburgh
- 2000 Richard Sykes
- 2008 Roy Anderson
- 2009 Keith O'Nions (Acting Rector)
- 2010 Keith O'Nions (Full appointment)
- 2014 Alice Gast
- 2022 Hugh Brady

== List of presidents ==
Until some time into Alice Gast's tenure the role was known as both president and rector.

- 2012 Keith O'Nions
- 2014 Alice Gast
- 2022 Hugh Brady

== See also ==
- List of Imperial College London people
