= Richard Henry Tizard =

British engineer and academic

Dick Tizard

Richard Henry Tizard (25 June 1917 – 5 September 2005) was a distinguished engineer and founding Fellow of Churchill College, Cambridge.

== Life ==
Dick Tizard was the son of Sir Henry Tizard. He was chosen by Sir John Cockcroft as a founding Fellow of Churchill College, a new science-focused college at the University of Cambridge. He offered a fellowship to John Arundel Barnes.

The 1960s were a period of student unrest and turbulence in academic governance. Tizard came from a family of high achievers with a productive stubborn streak. He used his political skills to marshal his grammar, state and public school intake behind a programme of historic renewal and reform in the University. In 1969, he led his colleagues to accept students into membership of the College Council and to admit women, the first Cambridge men's college to do so.

The same year, the Labour government's Representation of the People Act 1969 reduced the voting age to 18 years. Under Tizard's guidance, in 1970 Churchill's student union, the Junior Common Room (JCR), inspired by the worldwide student democracy movement, led the National Union of Students (NUS) in taking the Cambridge Town Clerk to the High Court to overturn a 19th-century precedent that won students the right to vote in their university towns.

As Senior Tutor, Tizard pioneered outreach, admitting 600 men from 300 schools. After his retirement, he discussed with non-resident members of the JCR the possibility of their extending this outreach activity to 30 primary schools.

Churchill College later named a room after him.

== See also ==
- Arthur Ransome
- Social history of Postwar Britain (1945–1979)
- Thomas Henry Tizard
