= Henry Tizard =

English chemist, inventor, and defence adviser (1885–1959)

Sir Henry Tizard GCB AFC FRS
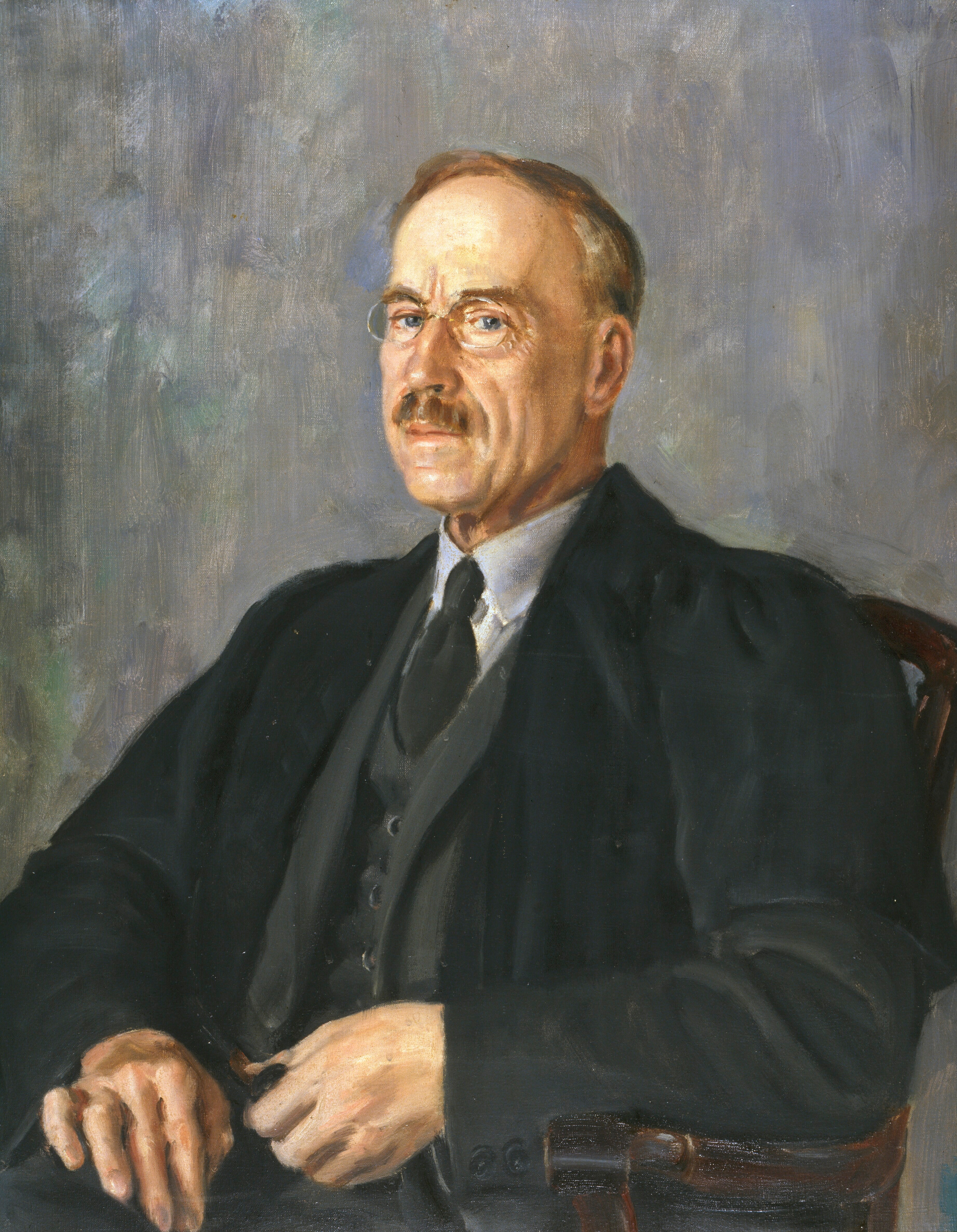
- Henry Tizard (1945)
- Born: 23 August 1885; Gillingham, Kent, England
- Died: 9 October 1959 (aged 74); Fareham, Hampshire, England
- Father: Thomas Henry Tizard
- Scientific career
- Awards: Albert Medal (1944); Fellow of the Royal Society
- Fields: Chemistry

Sir Henry Thomas Tizard GCB AFC FRS (23 August 1885 – 9 October 1959) was an English chemist, inventor and Rector of Imperial College, who developed the modern "octane rating" used to classify petrol, helped develop radar in World War II, and led the first serious studies of UFOs.

== Life ==
Tizard was born in Gillingham, Kent in 1885, the only son of Thomas Henry Tizard (1839–1924), naval officer and hydrographer, and his wife, Mary Elizabeth Churchward. His ambition to join the navy was thwarted by poor eyesight, and he instead studied at Westminster School and Magdalen College, Oxford, where he concentrated on mathematics and chemistry, doing work on indicators and the motions of ions in gases. Tizard graduated in 1908 and at his tutor's suggestion, he spent time in Berlin, where he met and formed a close friendship with Frederick Alexander Lindemann, later an influential scientific advisor of Winston Churchill. In 1909, he became a researcher in the Davy–Faraday Laboratory of the Royal Institution, working on colour change indicators. In 1911, Tizard returned to Oxford as a tutorial fellow at Oriel College and to work as a demonstrator in the electrical laboratory. On 25 July 1942, Tizard was elected President of Magdalen College, Oxford. He resigned this position in 1946.

Tizard was married on 24 April 1915 to Kathleen Eleanor (died 1968), daughter of Arthur Prangley Wilson, a mining engineer. They had three sons: Sir (John) Peter Mills Tizard, who became a professor of paediatrics at the University of London and Regius Professor of Physic at Oxford (1916–1993); Richard Henry Tizard (1917–2005), an engineer and senior tutor at Churchill College, Cambridge; and David (born 1922), a general practitioner in London.

On the first of July 1914 Henry Tizard left UK on the SS Euripides. He was accompanied by New Zealander Sir Ernest Rutherford, and many other scientists including the German physicist Peter Pringsheim. They were travelling to Australia for the 84th annual meeting of the British Association for the Advancement of Science (B.A.A.S.) which spent about 6 to 8 weeks visiting the cities of Perth, Adelaide, Melbourne, Sydney, and Brisbane. Unfortunately a trip to New Zealand was cancelled when World War I broke out on 28 July 1914. Lectures were open to the public and were very popular.

There is an album of private photographs taken by Winifred van Praagh who was travelling first class on this voyage and it includes several photos of these scientists. The caption on one of the photos says "Admiralty tug 7th August 1914 announced by megaphone war declared and saying 'Germans had been wiped out on sea, land and in the air' great cheers from Euripides." The ship arrived in New Zealand on 15 September 1914, after a journey of 2.5 months. Peter Pringsheim was interned in Melbourne until after the war in 1919.

== Career ==
=== First World War ===
"The secret of science", Tizard once said, "is to ask the right question, and it is the choice of problem more than anything else that marks the man of genius in the scientific world". His chosen problem became aeronautics. At the outbreak of World War I, he was commissioned as a second lieutenant into the Royal Garrison Artillery on 17 October 1914, in which his training methods were famously bizarre. He later transferred to the Royal Flying Corps, where he became an experimental equipment officer and learned to fly planes after his eyesight improved. He acted as his own test pilot for making aerodynamic observations. When his superior Bertram Hopkinson was moved to the Ministry of Munitions, Tizard went with him. When Hopkinson died in 1918, Tizard took over his post. Tizard served in the Royal Air Force from 1918 to 1919, ending the war at the rank of temporary lieutenant colonel

=== Interwar period ===
After the end of the war, he was made Reader in Chemical Thermodynamics at Oxford University, where he experimented in the composition of fuel trying to find compounds which were resistant to freezing and less volatile, devising the concept of "toluene numbers", now referred to as octane ratings. After that work (largely for Shell), he took up again a government post in 1920 as Assistant Secretary to the Department of Scientific and Industrial Research. His successes in that post (and after promotion to permanent secretary on 1 June 1927) included the establishment of the post of the Chemical Research Laboratory in Teddington, the appointment of Harry Wimperis as Director of Scientific Research to the Air Force and finally the decision to leave to become the President and Rector of Imperial College London in 1929, a position he held until 1942, when he was elected President of Magdalen College, Oxford.

In 1935, the development of radar in the United Kingdom was started by Tizard's Aeronautical Research Committee (and Committee for the Scientific Survey of Air Defence, which he chaired since 1933) doing the first experimental work at Orfordness, near Ipswich, before moving to the nearby Bawdsey Research Station (BRS) in 1936. In 1938, Tizard persuaded Mark Oliphant at Birmingham University to drop some of his nuclear research and concentrate on development of an improved source of short-wave radiation. This led to the invention by John Turton Randall and Harry Boot of the cavity magnetron, a major advance in radar technology, which in turn provided the basis for airborne interceptors using radar.

=== Second World War ===
In September 1940, after a top-secret landmark conference with Winston Churchill—at which his opposition to R.V. Jones' view that the Germans had established a system of radio-beam bombing aids (Battle of the Beams) over the UK had been overruled—Tizard led what became known as the Tizard Mission to the United States. This introduced to the US—among other things—the newly invented resonant-cavity magnetron (and other British radar developments), the Whittle gas turbine, and the British Tube Alloys (nuclear weapons) project.

=== Postwar ===
In 1946, Tizard remained in the defence establishment, chairing the Defence Research Policy Committee. He also chaired the Advisory Council on Scientific Policy from 1947 to 1952. In 1948, Tizard returned to the Ministry of Defence as Chief Scientific Adviser, a post he held until 1952. The Ministry of Defence's Nick Pope states that:

The Ministry of Defence’s UFO Project has its roots in a study commissioned in 1950 by the MOD's then Chief Scientific Adviser, the great radar scientist Sir Henry Tizard. As a result of his insistence that UFO sightings should not be dismissed without some form of proper scientific study, the department set up arguably the most marvellously-named committee in the history of the civil service, the Flying Saucer Working Party (FSWP).

Tizard had followed the official debate about ghost rockets with interest and was intrigued by the increasing media coverage of UFO sightings in the United Kingdom, America and other parts of the world. Using his authority as Chief Scientific Adviser at the MOD he decided that the subject should not be dismissed without proper, official investigation. Accordingly, he agreed that a small Directorate of Scientific Intelligence/Joint Technical Intelligence Committee (DSI/JTIC) working party should be set up to investigate the phenomenon. This was dubbed the Flying Saucer Working Party. The DSI/JTIC minutes recording this historic development read as follows:

The Chairman said that Sir Henry Tizard felt that reports of flying saucers ought not to be dismissed without some investigation and he had, therefore, agreed that a small DSI/JTIC Working Party should be set up under the chairmanship of Mr Turney to investigate future reports.

After discussion, it was agreed that the members of the Working Party should be representatives from DSI1, ADNI(Tech), MI10 and ADI(Tech). It was also agreed that it would probably be necessary at some time to consult the Meteorological Department and ORS Fighter Command, but that these two bodies should not at present be asked to nominate representatives.

One of the most controversial meetings that Tizard had to attend in his capacity as chair of the Defence Research Policy Committee would emerge only many years later with the declassification of CIA documents: a meeting on 1 June 1951 at the Ritz-Carlton Hotel in Montreal, Quebec, Canada, between Tizard, Omond Solandt (chairman of Defence Research and Development Canada) and representatives of the CIA to discuss "brainwashing".

== Awards and honours ==
Tizard was awarded the Air Force Cross on 2 November 1918 in recognition of his contribution to the war effort. In May 1926, he was elected a Fellow of the Royal Society. Tizard was invested as a Companion of the Order of the Bath (CB) in 1927, a Knight Commander (KCB) in 1937 and a Knight Grand Cross (GCB) in 1949. Tizard was awarded the 1946 Franklin Medal for his work in the field of engineering and presided over the 1948 meeting of the British Association for the Advancement of Science in Dundee.

Coat of arms of Henry Tizard

Motto
Silentium Stultorum Virtus

== Death ==
Tizard died in Fareham, Hampshire, in 1959. His papers are kept at the Imperial War Museum, London.

== See also ==
- Dehousing

== Sources ==
- Clark, Ronald W. (1965). Tizard. London. ISBN 0-262-03010-1.. A biography written at the request of the subject's son.
- Poliakoff, Martyn. "Following Henry Tizard". The Periodic Table of Videos. University of Nottingham.

Academic offices
Preceded by Thomas Holland	Rector of Imperial College London; 1929–1942	Succeeded by Richard Southwell
Preceded by George Stuart Gordon	President of Magdalen College, Oxford; 1942–1946	Succeeded by T. S. R. Boase
