= Matthew Kramer =

British legal scholar

Matthew H. Kramer FBA
- Born: 9 June 1959 (age 66); United States

Philosophical work
- Era: Contemporary philosophy
- Region: Western philosophy
- School: Moral realism; legal positivism; analytic tradition
- Institutions: Churchill College, Cambridge; Harvard University; Cornell University
- Main interests: Metaethics; normative ethics; legal philosophy; political philosophy

Matthew Henry Kramer FBA (born 9 June 1959) is an American philosopher, and is currently a Professor of Legal and Political Philosophy at the University of Cambridge and a Fellow of Churchill College, Cambridge. He writes mainly in the areas of metaethics, normative ethics, legal philosophy, and political philosophy. He is a leading proponent of legal positivism. He has been Director of the Cambridge Forum for Legal and Political Philosophy since 2000. He has been teaching at Cambridge University and at Churchill College since 1994.

== Career ==
Kramer was born in Massachusetts and educated at Middleborough High School, Cornell University (B.A. in Philosophy) where he became a member of Phi Beta Kappa society, Harvard University (J.D.) and Cambridge University (Ph.D. in Philosophy and LL.D.).

His twenty books as author and four as co-editor, as well as his dozens of journal articles, range over many areas of legal, political and moral philosophy. He has received several major research awards, including a Guggenheim Foundation Fellowship (2001) and a Leverhulme Trust Major Research Fellowship (2005). He is a subject editor for the Routledge Encyclopedia of Philosophy and is on the editorial board of the Oxford Studies in Political Philosophy, the American Journal of Jurisprudence, Law & Philosophy, Ratio Juris, and Legal Theory. He is also an Advisory Editor for the University of Bologna Law Review (general student-edited law journal).

At the undergraduate level he lectures and supervises in Jurisprudence, and he also lectures on Topics in Legal & Political Philosophy in the postgraduate LL.M. program. At Cambridge, he is a graduate supervisor both for Ph.D. students in the Law Faculty and for M.Phil. and Ph.D. students in the Philosophy Faculty.

He was a visiting professor at Hebrew University of Jerusalem in April 2009, and at Tel Aviv University in March 2012.

In 2014 he was elected a Fellow of the British Academy, the United Kingdom's national academy for the humanities and social sciences.

== Inclusive legal positivism ==
An inclusive legal positivist, Kramer argues in his book Where Law and Morality Meet that moral principles can enter into the law of any jurisdiction. He contends that legal officials can invoke moral principles as laws for resolving disputes, and that they can also invoke them as threshold tests which ordinary laws must satisfy. In opposition to many other theorists, Kramer argues that these functions of moral principles are consistent with all the essential characteristics of any legal system. He is also a leading proponent of the legal positivist argument that law and morality are separable, arguing against the position of natural-law theory, which portrays legal requirements as a species of moral requirements. According to him, even though the existence of a legal system in any sizeable society is essential for the realization of fundamental moral values, law is not inherently moral either in its effects or in its motivational underpinnings.

== Moral realism as a moral doctrine ==
Influenced by the theories of Ronald Dworkin, Kramer is a moral realist who argues that "moral requirements are strongly objective" and that "the objectivity of ethics is itself an ethical matter that rests primarily on ethical considerations." In his book Moral Realism as a Moral Doctrine, he claims that "[m]oral realism - the doctrine that morality is indeed objective - is a moral doctrine." Unlike Dworkin, he believes that, although there is a determinately correct moral answer to most moral questions, there exists genuine moral indeterminacy in relation to some rare moral questions. He also distances himself from Dworkin's defense of value monism.

== Publications ==
The following is a list of books written by Kramer.

Year	Title	ISBN
1991	Legal Theory, Political Theory, and Deconstruction: Against Rhadamanthus	0-253-33148-X
1995	Critical Legal Theory and the Challenge of Feminism: A Philosophical Reconception	0-847-67988-8
1997	John Locke and the Origins of Private Property: Philosophical Explorations of Individualism, Community, and Equality	0-521-54890-X
1997	Hobbes and the Paradoxes of Political Origins	978-0-312-16549-9
1998	A Debate Over Rights: Philosophical Enquiries	0-198-29899-4
1999	In the Realm of Legal and Moral Philosophy: Critical Encounters	0-333-74325-3
1999	In Defense of Legal Positivism: Law Without Trimmings	0-199-26483-X
2001	Rights, Wrongs, and Responsibilities	1-349-42757-8
2003	The Quality of Freedom	0-199-54573-1
2004	Where Law and Morality Meet	0-199-54613-4
2007	Objectivity and the Rule of Law	0-521-67010-1
2009	Moral Realism as a Moral Doctrine	
2011	The Ethics of Capital Punishment	0-199-64218-4
2014	Torture and Moral Integrity: A Philosophical Enquiry	0-198-71420-3
2017	Liberalism with Excellence	0-198-77796-5
2018	H.L.A. Hart: The Nature of Law	
2021	Freedom of Expression as Self-Restraint	0-198-86865-0
2022	Without Trimmings: The Legal, Moral, and Political Philosophy of Matthew Kramer	0-198-86886-3
2024	Rights and Right-Holding: A Philosophical Investigation	0-198-89122-9
2025	Legal Rights and Moral Rights	0-521-01116-7
