= Henry Bovey =

Henry Bovey LLD, DCL, FRS
- Born: 1852; Devon, England
- Died: 2 February 1912 (aged 59–60); Eastbourne, England
- Education: Queens' College, Cambridge
- Occupation: University administrator

Henry Taylor Bovey, LLD, DCL, FRS (1852 – 2 February 1912) was an engineering science academic. He was the first Rector of Imperial College of Science and Technology in London.

== Early life ==
Henry Bovey was born in 1852 in Devon. He was educated at Queens' College, Cambridge, where he graduated BA (as 12th Wrangler) in 1873. He was subsequently elected a Fellow of the college.

== Career ==
Bovey joined the staff of the Mersey Docks and Harbour Board in Liverpool and became an assistant engineer. He trained with Sir George Fosbery Lyster in the area of structures.

In 1877, Bovey took up the position of professor of civil engineering and applied mechanics at McGill University in Montreal, Quebec, Canada, where using his administrative skills he developed the Engineering Faculty.

Bovey was offered the position of Rector of Imperial College in 1907, although his health was failing by this time. The appointment was confirmed in May 1908 but his bad health meant that he had to resign the position at the end of 1909. In 1912, he died in Eastbourne.

Henry Bovey was a founder member of the Canadian Society of Civil Engineers and the Liverpool Society of Civil Engineers. He was elected a Fellow of the Royal Society (FRS) in June 1902, and was a Fellow of the Royal Society of Canada.

== Death ==
Bovey died on 2 February 1912 at Eastbourne, England.

== Books ==
- Applied mechanics, 1882.
- A treatise on hydraulics. New York: J. Wiley; London: Chapman & Hall, 1899, c1895.

Academic offices
Preceded by Post created	Rector of Imperial College London; 1908–1910	Succeeded by Alfred Keogh
