= Roderic Hill =

Royal Air Force Air Chief Marshal (1894–1954)

Sir Roderic Maxwell Hill
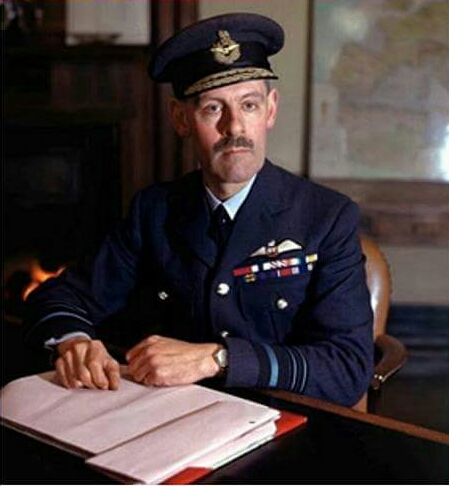
- Born: 1 March 1894; Hampstead, London, England
- Died: 6 October 1954 (aged 60)
- Military career
- Allegiance: United Kingdom
- Branch: British Army (1914–1918); Royal Air Force (1918–1948)
- Service years: 1914–1948
- Rank: Air Chief Marshal
- Commands: Fighter Command (1943–1945); No. 12 Group (1943); RAF Staff College (1942–1943); Palestine and Transjordan Command (1936–38); No. 45 Squadron (1924–1925)
- Conflicts: First World War; Arab revolt in Palestine; Second World War
- Awards: Knight Commander of the Order of the Bath; Military Cross; Air Force Cross & Bar; Mentioned in Despatches (4); Commander of the Legion of Merit (United States); Grand Cross of the Order of the White Lion (Czechoslovakia); Commander of the Order of Leopold (Belgium); Croix de guerre (France)
- Other work: Rector of Imperial College London (1948–53)

Air Chief Marshal Sir Roderic Maxwell Hill, KCB, MC, AFC & Bar (1 March 1894 – 6 October 1954) was a senior Royal Air Force commander during the Second World War. He was a former Rector of Imperial College and Vice-Chancellor of London University. The Department of Aeronautics of Imperial College was situated in a building named after him.

== Early life ==
Roderic Maxwell Hill was born in Hampstead, London, on 1 March 1894, the eldest of the three children of Michaiah John Muller Hill, professor of mathematics at University College, London, and his wife, Minnie. His brother was Geoffrey T. R. Hill and Sir George Francis Hill was their uncle. Roderic was educated at Bradfield College and, in 1912, went to the fine arts department of University College, London, with the ambition of becoming an architect. From 1909 onwards both he and Geoffrey became fascinated by aviation; with money earned by Roderic from drawings published in The Sphere, they built, and successfully flew, a glider of their own design in 1913.

== RAF career ==
Hill was commissioned as a 2nd lieutenant in the 12th Northumberland Fusiliers in December 1914, and was posted to France in the second half of 1915. Hill first saw intensive combat in the Battle of Loos, where he earned a mention in despatches but suffered a wound in the side.

While recovering from his wounds, Hill successfully applied to join the Royal Flying Corps and by July 1916 he had transferred and qualified as a pilot. Demonstrating above average flying ability he was posted to No. 60 Squadron, then flying the tricky Morane-Saulnier N. He quickly proved himself a skilled pilot, making repeated patrols and engagements over the German lines and fighting in the air battles during the Somme offensive in November 1916. Shortly after this he was again mentioned in despatches and awarded the Military Cross, for "conspicuous skill and gallantry. Under very heavy fire he dived at an enemy balloon, and brought it down in flames." In December 1916 Hill became flight commander of No. 60 Squadron and was promoted captain.

In February 1917, Hill's reputation as an intelligent pilot with aerobatic skills led to his posting as the leader of the experimental flying department at Royal Aircraft Factory, Farnborough. There, his test flying contributed to the success of the S.E.5, the R.E.8, and the DH.9 (with the Napier Lion engine). On the formation of the Royal Air Force in April 1918, Hill was promoted to squadron leader. In August of that year he was awarded the Air Force Cross (AFC) for meritorious flying as an experimental pilot at Farnborough; he had flown into a barrage balloon cable to test a newly invented protective device. During this tour, he also carried out development work testing wireless direction finding, radio control; he experimented personally with early types of parachute. In recognition, he was awarded a Bar to his AFC in 1921. At the Hendon Pageant of 1922, he demonstrated the manoeuvrability of the Airco DH.10 Amiens twin-engined bomber in a mock dogfight with S.E 5 fighters. Also in that year, he won the R. M. Groves aeronautical research prize. (Note: The R. M. Groves aeronautical research prize was awarded annually to the officer, non-commissioned officer or airman who, in the opinion of the Air Council, had done most during the preceding year to advance aeronautical science.)

Hill remained at Farnborough until 1923, when he attended the RAF Staff College in Andover. After graduating in 1924, he was briefly employed on Air Staff duties at Inland and Area H.Q. then in September was posted as the commanding officer of No. 45 Squadron at Hinaidi. There he was instrumental in running the Cairo–Baghdad air route, flying Vickers Vernon transport aircraft, and in maintaining the security of Iraq. He wrote and illustrated a memoir of his time in Iraq and the Middle East: it gives a lively account of flying the large biplanes of the period over difficult desert terrain, and also provides a sharply focussed, and sometimes lyrical description of the landscape and people of the region.

Hill joined the Directing Staff at the RAF Staff College in 1927 and then went on to be the Officer Commanding the Oxford University Air Squadron in 1930, deputy director of Repair and Maintenance at the Air Ministry in 1932 and Air Officer Commanding Palestine & Transjordan Command in 1936.

During the Second World War Hill was Director-General of Research and Development at the Air Ministry and then Commandant of the RAF Staff College from 1942. He was appointed Air Officer Commanding No. 12 Group in 1943 and then served as Commander-in-Chief of Fighter Command (also briefly called the Air Defence of Great Britain during his command) from 1943 to 1945. Under his command the RAF was able to deal a blow to the German Luftwaffe's strategic bombing campaign during Operation Steinbock.

After the war Hill was Air Member for Training and then Air Member for Technical Services before retiring in 1948. In retirement he became Rector of Imperial College. In 1953 he was nominated Vice-Chancellor of London University, before ill-health forced him to resign in the following year before completing his term of office.

== Personal life ==
Befitting of his original ambition to be an architect, Hill was a talented illustrator. During the First World War, and for a time afterwards, he was a frequent contributor of drawings to Flight.

Hill married Mabel Helen Catherine Morton in 1917. They had two daughters and an only son who was killed in action in 1944. Hill died from a coronary thrombosis near St Bartholomew's Hospital.

He is survived by his daughter Phoebe Caldwell

== See also ==
- List of Vice-Chancellors of the University of London

== Notes ==
Military offices
Preceded by John Andrews	Air Officer Commanding No. 12 Group; 1943	Succeeded by Malcolm Henderson
Preceded by Sir Trafford Leigh-Mallory	Commander-in-Chief Fighter Command; 1943–1945	Succeeded by Sir James Robb
Preceded by Sir Peter Drummond	Air Member for Training; 1945–1946	Post abolished Duties transferred to the Assistant Chief of the Air Staff (Training)
Academic offices
Preceded by Richard Southwell	Rector of Imperial College London; 1948–1953	Succeeded by Patrick Linstead
Preceded by Hugh Hale Bellot	Vice-Chancellor of the University of London; 1953–54	Succeeded by Sir John Lockwood
