= HMS Triton (1882) =

HMS Triton was a paddle steamer which was used by the Royal Navy for many years as a survey ship. The ship was commissioned by Staff Commander Thomas Henry Tizard, who had started a survey of the coast of England in 1879 in HMS Porcupine, which was sold after HMS Triton became available for use. Tizard continued this work until 1891.

Following this HMS Triton undertook survey work in Pacific Ocean.

In 191 she was retired from active service, and with her engines and funnels removed became a training ship at the Thames Nautical Training College.

== Charts produced by the crew of HMS Triton ==
Admiralty Chart No 1543 England - east coast, Yarmouth and Lowestoft Roads surveyed by Staff Comr. T.H. Tizard, R.N. and the officers of H.M.S. Triton 1885 RMG L1221, Published 1886
