= Nigel Knight =

British economist, author and political scientist

- Born: 1956 (age 68–69)
- Occupation(s): Educator, writer

Nigel Knight (born 1956) is a British economist, author and political scientist. He has written books entitled Governing Britain since 1945 and Churchill: The Greatest Briton Unmasked.

== Professional background ==
Knight is a Fellow and Director of Studies in Economics at Churchill College, University of Cambridge, and he lectures in the Faculty of Economics and Politics.

His book, Churchill: The Greatest Briton Unmasked, is a critical biography of British politician Winston Churchill. His book, Governing Britain since 1945 (2006), covers 60 years of British social policy.

== Published works ==
- Knight, Nigel (2006). Governing Britain Since 1945, Politicos Publishing, ISBN 978-1842751787
- Knight, Nigel (2008). Churchill: The Greatest Briton Unmasked, David & Charles, 408 pages. ISBN 978-0715328552
