= Richard Sheppard (architect) =

English architect (1910-1982

Sir Richard Sheppard CBE RA FRIBA
- Born: Richard Herbert Sheppard; 2 July 1910; Bristol, England
- Died: 18 December 1982 (aged 72); Hertford County Hospital, Hertfordshire, England
- Occupation: Architect

Sir Richard Herbert Sheppard CBE RA FRIBA (2 July 1910 – 18 December 1982) was an English architect.

Sheppard was born in Bristol. He was educated at Bristol Grammar School and trained as an architect at the Royal West of England Academy and the Architectural Association School of Architecture (AA School) in London. He qualified as an architect in 1936 . When he was 19 years old, and during his time at the Royal West of England Academy, he lost the use of his legs through poliomyelitis. He spent two years in hospital, he was on crutches until he was 66 years old, thereafter he used a wheelchair.

He was married Jean Shufflebottom on 21 July 1938, a fellow architect whom he met at the AA School.

== Career ==
Sheppard and his wife originally worked as teachers of architecture at the AA School, which was evacuated from London to Mount House in Monken Hadley during the Second World War. Sheppard was the school's vice-principal.

Sheppard's firm, Richard Sheppard, Robson & Partners, which he and his wife founded in 1958 with Geoffrey Robson, was responsible for the design of over eighty schools, as well as buildings at Loughborough University, the University of Leicester, Brunel University, City University, the University of Durham, the University of Newcastle, Manchester Polytechnic, Imperial College, London, and Churchill College, Cambridge.

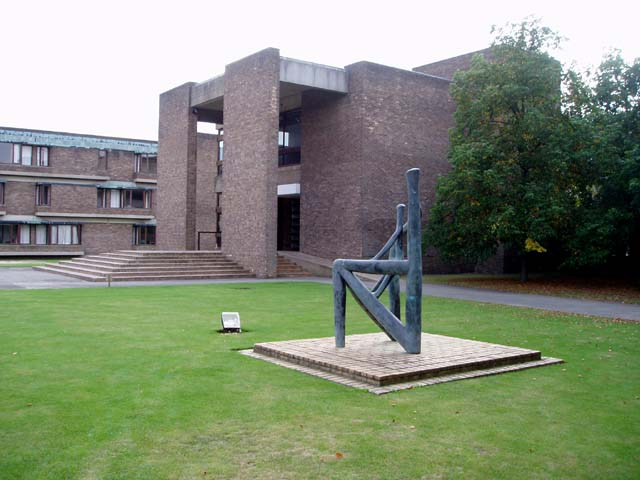
Churchill College

In 1959, early into the partnership's existence, the firm won the competition to build Churchill College at the University of Cambridge. Sir Winston Churchill was on the panel which decided the winner. While a modernist building of brown brick and pre-cast concrete lintels, it maintained the Cambridge tradition of enclosed residential courts. He also designed the ecumenical chapel at Churchill College, which caused some controversy at the time, including the resignation of Francis Crick as a fellow. The chapel was an after-thought, given that the original specification was that Churchill College would not have a place of worship. Sheppard's chapel was also designed with brown brick and pre-cast concrete and with a copper roof. It is located 500 metres away from the main college buildings, as part of the compromising process that the controversy engendered. Notably it is the chapel at Churchill College, rather than the chapel of the college. Both the college and the chapel were designated as Grade II Listed Buildings in 1993.

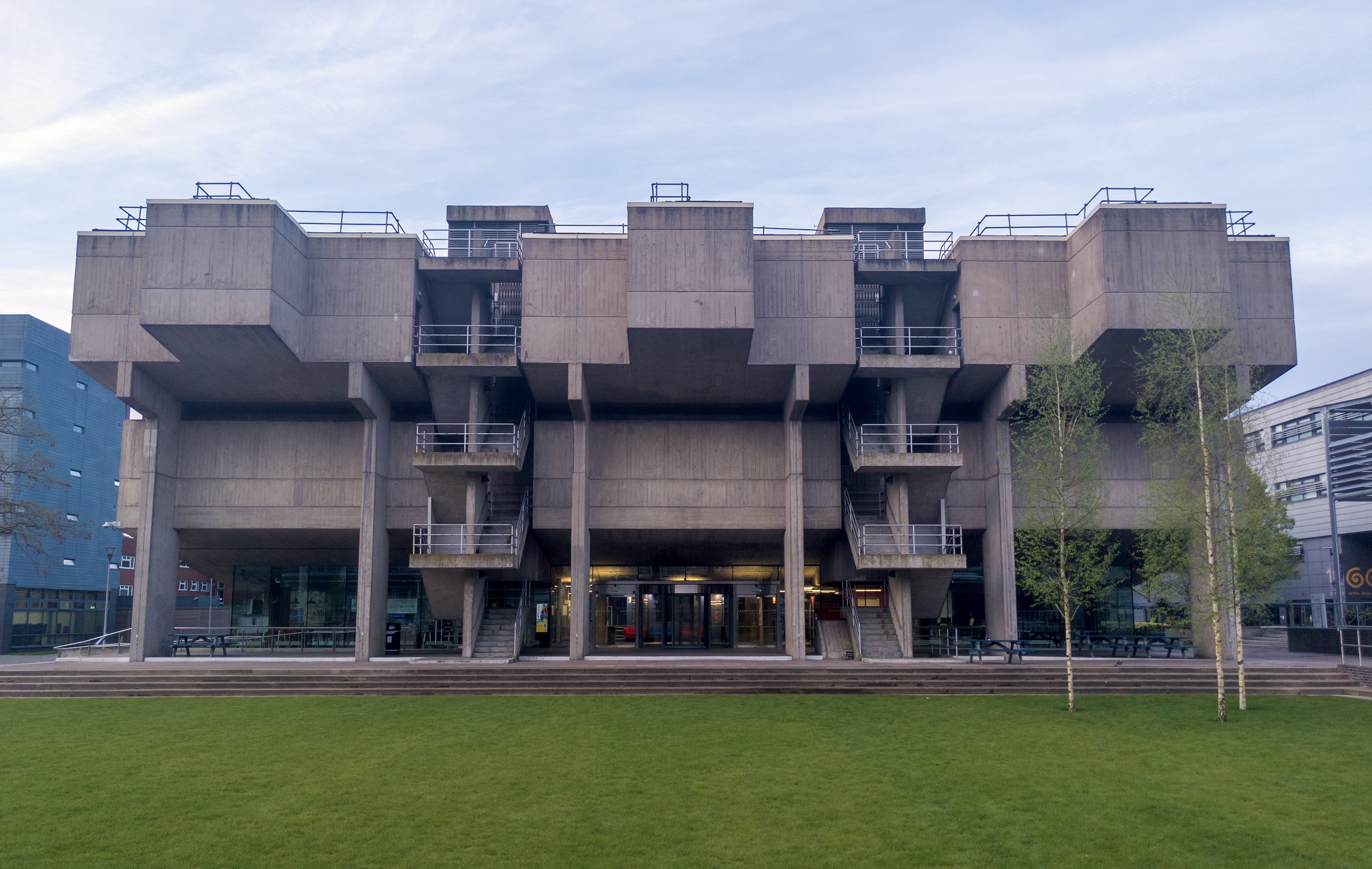
Brunel University lecture centre

Sheppard designed the Brunel University lecture centre, a complex involving six large lecture theatres all built in one group, over two levels and sharing a central concourse. The buildings, completed in 1968, were constructed with a reinforced concrete frame, and set between giant exposed off-form concrete pillars. The complex also has teaching rooms and some smaller lecture theatres. Stanley Kubrick's 1991 film Clockwork Orange (film) used the location as the scene of the government hospital. It was given Grade II listed status in 1990 and is featured in the Atlas of Brutalist Architecture.

His other noted works include buildings in the Swan Hunter shipyard on the River Tyne, by Newcastle, and the shopping centres at Wood Green, London and Waltham Cross, Hertfordshire.

Sheppard served on the council of the Royal Institute of British Architecture (RIBA) for two decades from 1954, was the RIBA vice-president in 1969-1970, and the chairman of Association of Consulting Architects until his death. He wrote the entry for the fellow modernist architect F. R. S. Yorke in the Oxford Dictionary of National Biography.

== Personal life and recognition ==
Jean Shufflebottom died in 1974. He then married Marjorie Head in 1976, who survived him. He had a son and daughter through his first marriage. He was appointed a Commander of the Order of the British Empire (CBE) in 1964 and was knighted in the 1981 Birthday Honours.
