= Churchill College, Cambridge =

College of the University of Cambridge

Churchill College
- University of Cambridge
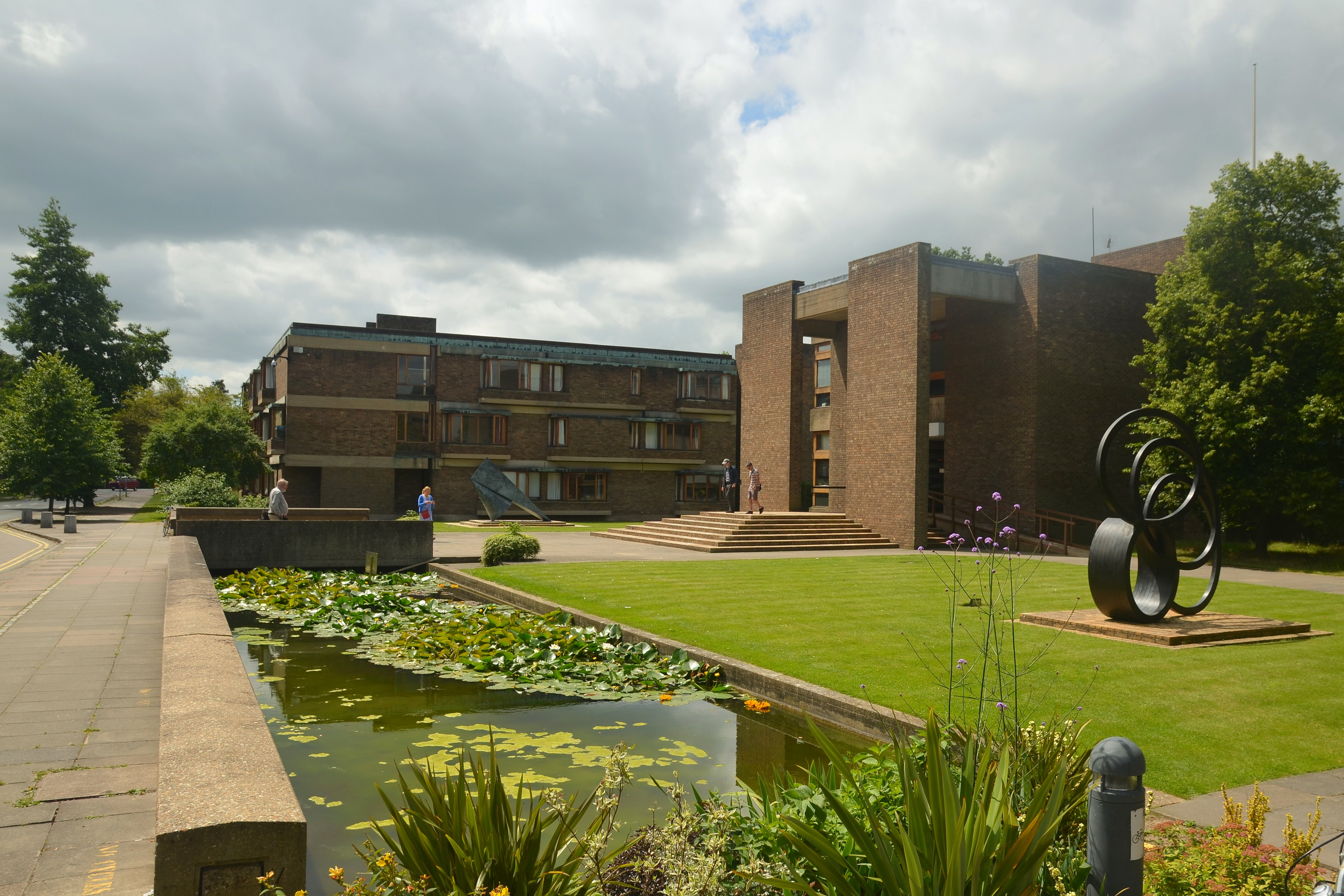
- Entrance to Churchill College in June 2019

- Arms of Churchill College
Scarf colours: black, with two equally-spaced narrow stripes of brown edged with pink
- Location: Storey's Way, Cambridge CB3 0DS
- Coordinates: 52.213°N 0.101°E
- Abbreviation: CHU
- Motto in English: Forward
- Established: 1958 (Note: 1966 - Date of recognition by the university as a constituent college.)
- Named after: Winston Churchill
- Sister college: Trinity College, Oxford
- Master: Sharon Peacock
- Undergraduates: 504 (2022-23)
- Postgraduates: 348 (2022-23)
- Endowment: £37.4m (2023)
- Visitor: Lord Sales
- Website: www.chu.cam.ac.uk
- JCR: jcr.chu.cam.ac.uk
- MCR: mcr.chu.cam.ac.uk
- Boat club: Churchill College Boat Club

Map
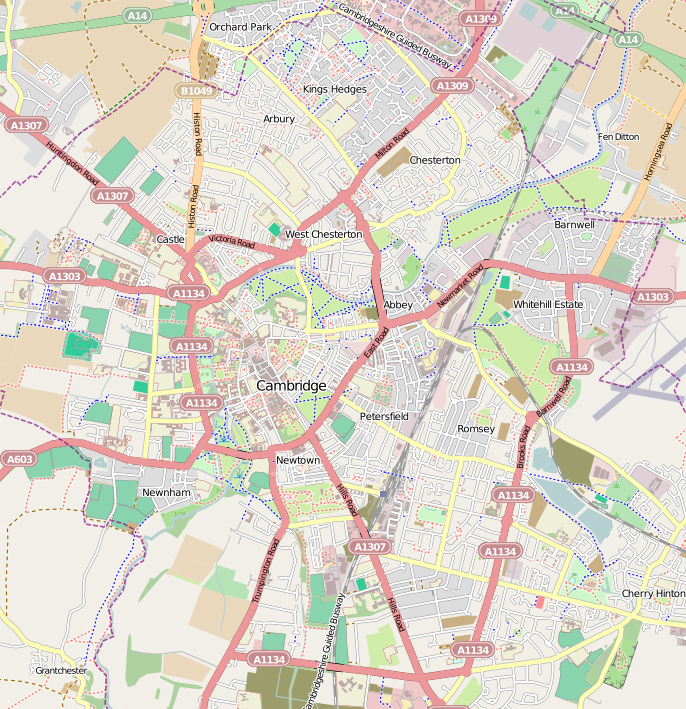
- Location within Cambridge

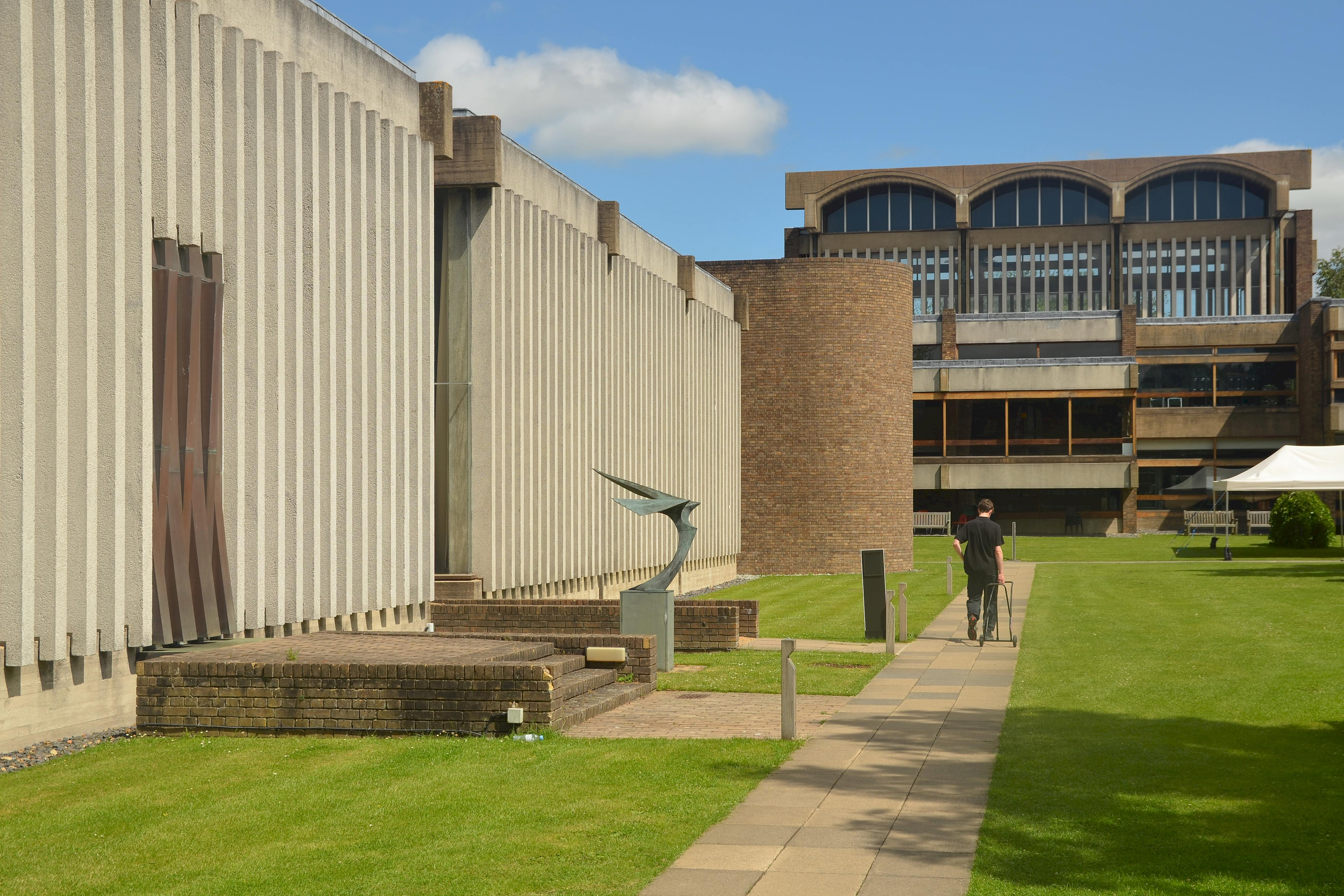
Churchill Archives Centre and dining hall

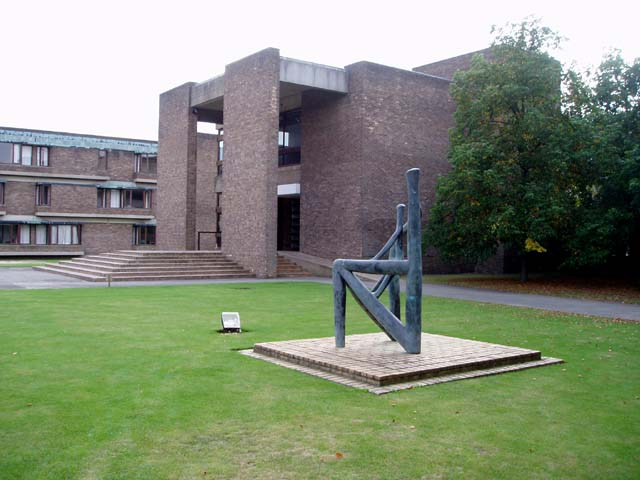
Main entrance and Dhruva Mistry sculpture

Churchill College is a constituent college of the University of Cambridge in Cambridge, England. It has a primary focus on science, engineering and technology, but retains a strong interest in the arts and humanities.

In 1958, a trust was established with Sir Winston Churchill as its chairman of trustees, to build and endow a college for 60 fellows and 540 students as a national and Commonwealth memorial to Winston Churchill; its Royal Charter and Statutes were approved by the Queen Elizabeth II, in August 1960. It is situated on the outskirts of Cambridge, away from the traditional centre of the city, but close to the University's main new development zone (which now houses the Centre for Mathematical Sciences). It has 16 ha (40 acres) of grounds, the largest area of the Cambridge colleges.

Churchill was the first formerly all-male college to decide to admit women, and was among three men's colleges to admit its first women students in 1972. Within 15 years all others had followed suit. The college has a reputation for relative informality compared with other Cambridge colleges, and traditionally admits a larger proportion of its undergraduates from state schools.

The college motto is "Forward", which was taken from the final phrase of Winston Churchill's first speech to the House of Commons as Prime Minister of the United Kingdom, known as the "blood, toil, tears and sweat" speech in which Churchill said, "Come, then, let us go forward together".

== History ==
In 1955, on holiday in Sicily soon after his resignation as prime minister, Winston Churchill discussed with Sir John Colville and Lord Cherwell the possibility of founding a new institution. Churchill had been impressed by the United States' Massachusetts Institute of Technology and wanted a British version, but the plans evolved into the more modest proposal of creating a science and technology-based college within the University of Cambridge. Churchill wanted a mix of non-scientists to ensure a well-rounded education and environment for scholars and fellows. The college therefore admits students to read all subjects except land economy and theology & religious studies (though it is possible to switch to these subjects later).

The first postgraduate students arrived in October 1960, and the first undergraduates a year later. Full college status was received in 1966.

Following the Labour government's Representation of the People Act 1969, which reduced the voting age to 18 years, under the guidance of professor Dick Tizard, in 1970 Churchill's student union, the Junior Common Room (JCR), inspired by the worldwide student democracy movement, led the National Union of Students (NUS) in taking the Cambridge Town Clerk to the High Court to overturn a 19th-century precedent that won students the right to vote in their university towns.

Initially all students were male. Women were accepted as undergraduates in 1972, one of the first three previously all-male colleges to do so.

The bias towards science and engineering remains as policy to the current day, with the statutes requiring approximately 70% science and technology students amongst its student intake each year. The college statutes also stipulate that one third of the students of the college should be studying for postgraduate qualification.

Cambridge University Radio (later Cam FM) broadcast from Churchill College from 1979 until 2011.

On 27 October 2020, the college launched Churchill, Empire and Race, intended as a year-long programme looking critically at its founder. However in June 2021, the programme was "abruptly" terminated following a dispute with the college's leadership.

== Buildings and grounds ==
=== Main campus ===
Churchill College occupies a 50-acre campus located to the west of Cambridge city centre. It features extensive gardens and green spaces, along with three libraries, sports and performing arts facilities, and dedicated creative workshops. Most student accommodation is also situated on campus, with undergraduates guaranteed on-site housing for the full duration of their degree.

The then-undeveloped site was purchased in 1958 for the express purpose of building a campus for the new College. Following an architectural competition in which 19 entrants competed, the firm of Richard Sheppard, Robson & Partners was selected from a shortlist of four, with Sir Winston Churchill himself among the panel of judges. Richard Sheppard's resolutely modernist scheme for the campus - the hallmarks of which are brown brick walls, pre-cast concrete lintels, and teak-framed glazing - is softened by the extensive landscaped grounds in which the buildings are situated. The landscape architect Sheila Haywood drew up the landscape master plan in 1959 for the grounds. Construction was completed in 1968 with nine main residential courts and a central building consisting of the dining hall, buttery, combination rooms and offices. A pair of tall brick piers stand at the main entrance, which has a pivoting aluminium entrance gate by sculptor Geoffrey Clarke recessed between. Sheppard's dining hall is the largest of any Cambridge college, measuring 220 m². It can cater for up to 430 guests in a formal dining arrangement. As well as the main College buildings, Sheppard designed a separate group of flats, since known as the Sheppard flats, for the use of married graduate students. These are located to one side of the College grounds, a short distance from the main campus.

On 30 March 1993, the college's central buildings and chapel were separately granted Grade II listed heritage status in recognition of their architectural significance.

=== Churchill Archives Centre ===
In 1974, an extension to the library building was added to house the Churchill Archives Centre. Its original purpose was to provide a home to Sir Winston Churchill's papers, however since then it has been endowed with papers from other political figures including former Prime Ministers Margaret Thatcher and John Major, as well as former Leader of the Opposition Neil Kinnock, and those of eminent scientists and engineers including Reginald Victor Jones, Rosalind Franklin and Sir Frank Whittle.

=== Møller Institute ===
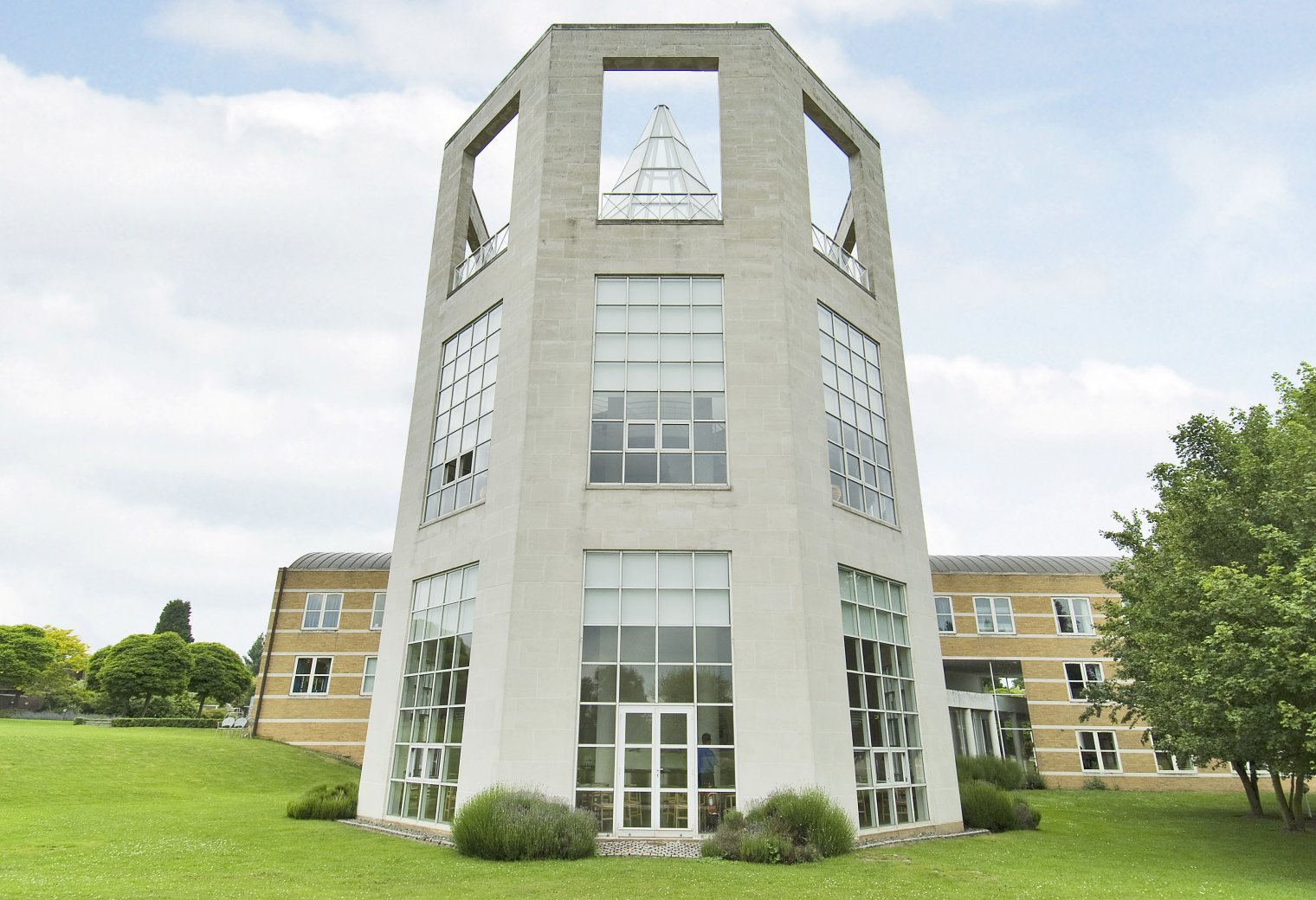
The Møller Institute

The Møller Centre for Continuing Education was established at Churchill College in 1992 to bring together education and commerce. It was funded by a donation from the Møller Foundation. The building, designed by the Danish architect Henning Larsen, was officially opened by Her Majesty Queen Ingrid of Denmark. The defining architectural feature of the dedicated residential executive training and conference centre is a large three-storey octagonal tower. In January 2018, the facility was granted institute status, and its name was officially changed to the Møller Institute.

=== Cowan Court ===
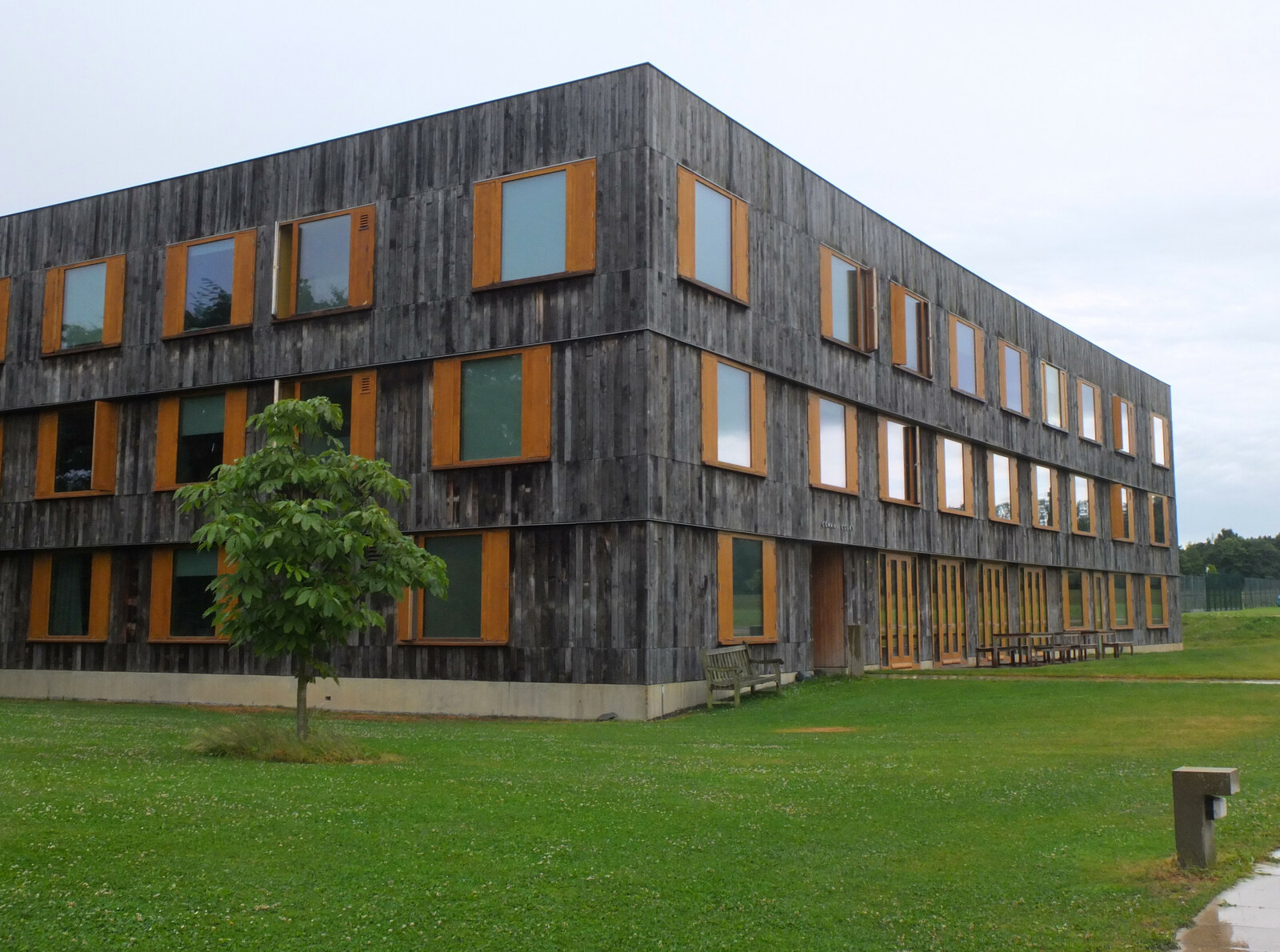
Cowan Court

In 2016, Cowan Court - a 68-room hall of residence - was completed, the first new court to be built at Churchill College since completion of the original campus. It was named after Michael Cowan, an alumnus and long-time supporter of the College, who made a significant donation towards the funding of the building. Designed by 6a architects, Cowan Court was named as one of the top 10 buildings of 2016 by the Guardian's architecture and design critic Oliver Wainwright. In 2017 it won a RIBA East Award.

=== Artworks and sculptures ===
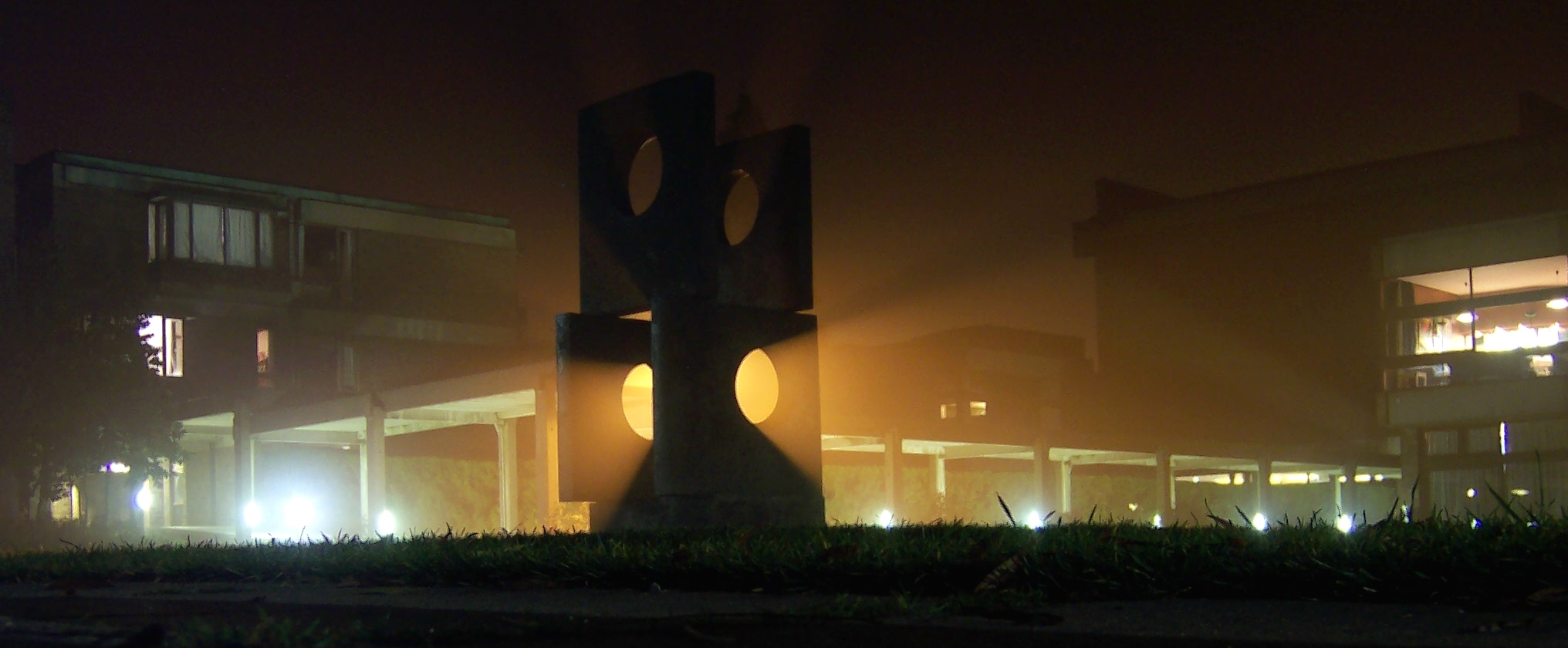
Hepworth's Four-Square (Walk Through) (1966) is large enough for many students to work and play on – which they are allowed to do

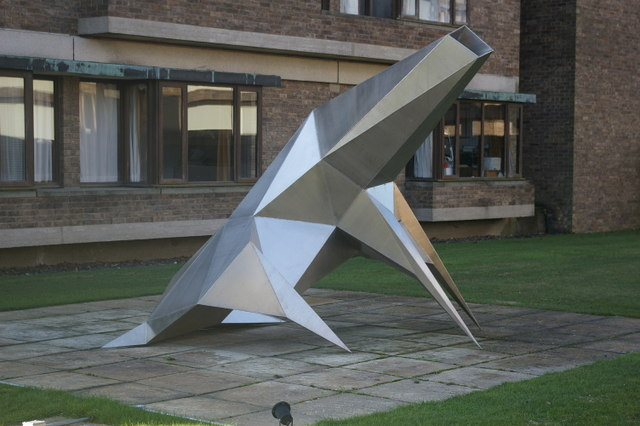
Beast Alerted 1, by British sculptor Lynn Chadwick

The college contains many examples of modern artwork including:

- Four-Square (Walk Through) (1966) – Dame Barbara Hepworth
- Prints of Marilyn Monroe – Andy Warhol
- Gemini (1973) – Denis Mitchell
- Diagram of an Object (Second state) (1990) – Dhruva Mistry
- Spiral – Michael Gillespie (1993)
- Flight – Peter Lanyon (1981)
- Black Bag – Graham Murdoch (1990)
- Past, Present, Future – Geoffrey Clarke (2010)

There are also works by Sir Eduardo Paolozzi, Bridget Riley, Patrick Caulfield, Sir Peter Blake, and Daphne Hardy Henrion.

Hepworth's Four-Square (Walk Through) stands at the West Door, the west exit of the main college complex. In 1968, it replaced an earlier Hepworth sculpture, Squares with Two Circles (BH 347) which had been sold to a private collector. Two sculptures by Nigel Hall stand in front of the main gate of the college: The Now (1999) and Southern Shade I (2010). Mistry's Diagram of an Object (Second state) used to be found at the front of college, but is now located next to the chapel at the far end of the college. Sir Anthony Caro's Forum used to stand near the front gate of the college but it was removed in 2004 and replaced in 2007 by Lynn Chadwick's Beast Alerted 1.

=== Chapel ===
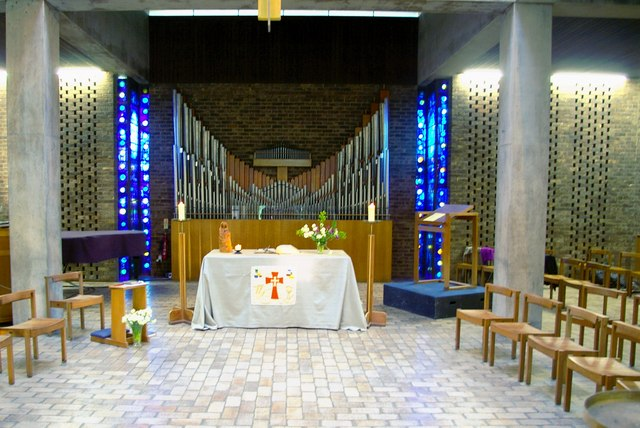
Interior of the chapel

At the farthest end of the College grounds stands the Chapel. Its remote position is no accident, the result of an impassioned debate between the founding fellows of the College. To begin with, the fellows positively dismissed the requirement for a religious building within a modern, scientifically-oriented academic institution - particularly in a city filled with churches - a position supported by Sir Winston Churchill himself.

However, when the plans for the College were unveiled in May 1958, the student newspaper Varsity declared the intended absence of a chapel to be "deplorable", igniting a wider public debate. Seeking to defuse the situation the fellows tentatively acknowledged that a chapel might be built at an indeterminate future point should funds become available. Responding to this new requirement, Richard Sheppard's original 1958 design for the college campus placed a chapel within the main building complex near the entrance to the college.

The matter came to a head in 1960 when a donation was made by Lord Beaumont of Whitley, which was intended to cover the entire cost of building a chapel for the College, thereby removing one of the principal objections that funds could be better spent elsewhere. The majority of fellows voted in favour of accepting Lord Beaumont's gift. The move infuriated no one more than Francis Crick, who resigned as a fellow of the College in 1961 in direct response. Crick claimed that he had agreed to become a fellow on the basis that no chapel would be placed at the College. Churchill wrote to Crick saying that no-one need enter the chapel unless they wished to do so, and therefore it did not need to be a problem. Crick replied with a letter accompanied by a cheque for 10 guineas saying that, if that were the case, the enclosed money should be used for the establishment of a brothel.

Eventually a compromise was reached: an interdenominational chapel would be sited just to the west of Sheppard Flats, 500 yards from the main campus, and funded and managed separately from the College itself, being tactfully referred to as "the Chapel at Churchill College" rather than "the Chapel of Churchill College". Ground was broken in July 1966 and building was completed in October 1967. The chimney of the heating system at the front of the college substitutes visually for the missing chapel tower envisaged in Sheppard's original plan.

Sheppard's design for the Chapel has been described as a modern interpretation of a Byzantine basilica, a Greek cross marked out in concrete beams and exposed brick. Externally, the dominant features are the four massive triangular concrete pillars that rise from the centre. A small bell turret over the entrance carries the bell from the aircraft carrier HMS Hermes, which had been launched in 1953 by Clementine Churchill.

Inside, the chapel is dark and shielded from the sight and sound of the outside world. The concrete frame is exposed, filled with brick. Eight narrow vertical slit windows contain stained glass designed by John Piper and manufactured by Patrick Reyntiens. Piper was commissioned in 1967 and the windows were unveiled in 1970 as a memorial to Sir John Cockcroft. Their shafts of blue, mauve, gold, and green light are entirely abstract, though the theme is Let there be light (Genesis 1:3). At the east: humanity's search for truth and God's revelation. At the west: humanity's industry and God's creativity. At the north: humanity's search for beauty and God's response. At the south: humanity's search for love and God's response.

Most of the fittings stand independently, creating a flexible space conducive to the divergent liturgical needs of an interdenominational building. Ornament is minimal. An abstract three-dimensional hanging cross, designed by Keith Thyssen, and a set of four candlesticks, were given by the Worshipful Company of Goldsmiths. The chairs were commissioned from Sir Gordon Russell and model those he designed for Coventry Cathedral. The lecterns were designed by Sheppard himself, while the font is by Peter Sellwood.

== Student life ==
The student population is divided into two common rooms: the Junior Common Room (JCR) and Middle Common Room (MCR). The former contains undergraduates and the latter postgraduates (known as advanced students). Fourth year undergraduates studying towards their Masters may choose to be in either. These student bodies organise various academic and social events as well as handling issues regarding welfare. The college funds sports clubs and societies which provide entertainment for students.

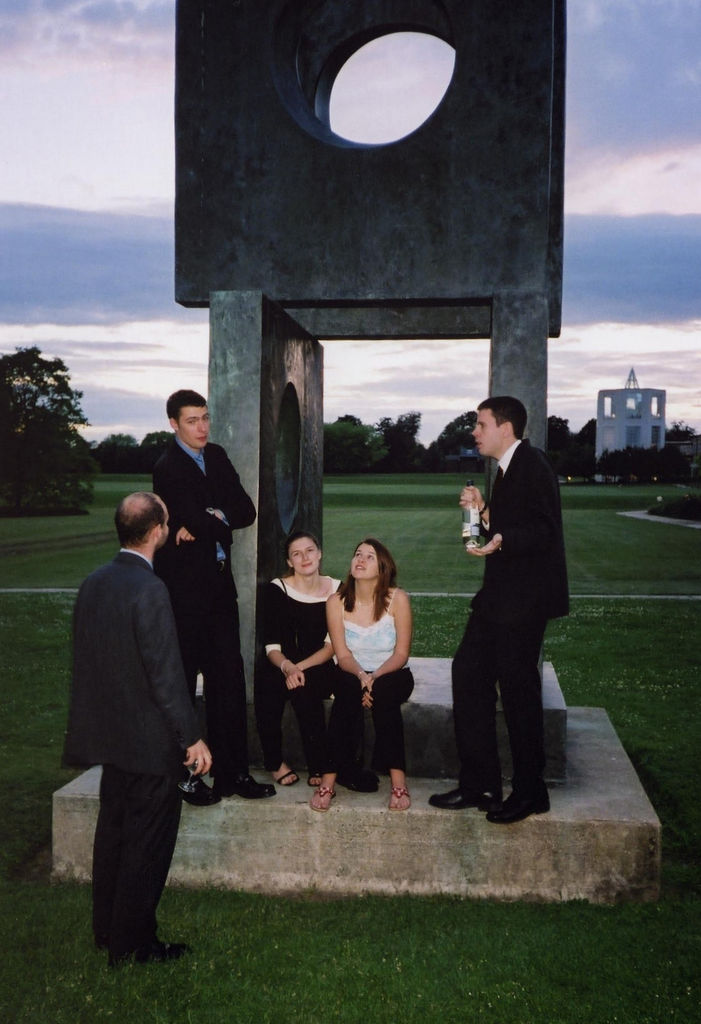
Students relaxing on 'The Hepworth' or 'Babs' following a formal

=== Social events ===
Every two weeks of the Michaelmas and Lent terms, and twice in Easter term, Churchill is host to Pav, a music event unusual for Cambridge events in that it is free and open to all university members. The name Pav originates from the pavilion buildings of the college where the event was originally held. Since 1992, Pav has been held in the Buttery, the main bar area.

In the early years of the college's foundation, the college held a ball in May Week, in common with many older colleges. However, more recently Churchill has held a Spring Ball every February, close to Valentine's Day. The Ball has hosted a number of upcoming bands, such as The Wombats (2007) and The Noisettes (2008).

During May Week the JCR organise a free garden party. The event hosts performances from local bands and musicians.

Students of the College run Churchill Casino, a Cambridge-based enterprise which provides professional casinos at various social events. Churchill Casino is frequently hired for Cambridge May Balls as well as balls at the University of Oxford and corporate events throughout the country. Profits have been donated back towards the college and to local charities.

The MCR has its own reserved area, the Sandy Ashmore Room, where students may socialise. This incorporates a student-run bar known as the Vicious Penguin. The MCR organises a range of activities including an annual conference, the Conference on Everything, and hosts termly Guest Nights. The Conference on Everything gives students an opportunity to present their own research as well as featuring talks from distinguished speakers including Salah Al-Shaikhly, the Iraqi ambassador to the United Kingdom; Michael Green, Lucasian Professor and pioneer of string theory; Julian Huppert, scientist and Member of Parliament (MP) for Cambridge; David Spiegelhalter, Winton Professor of the Public Understanding of Risk, and Nicholas Bingham, Senior Investigator at Imperial College London and Visiting Professor of Mathematics at the London School of Economics.

=== Sport ===
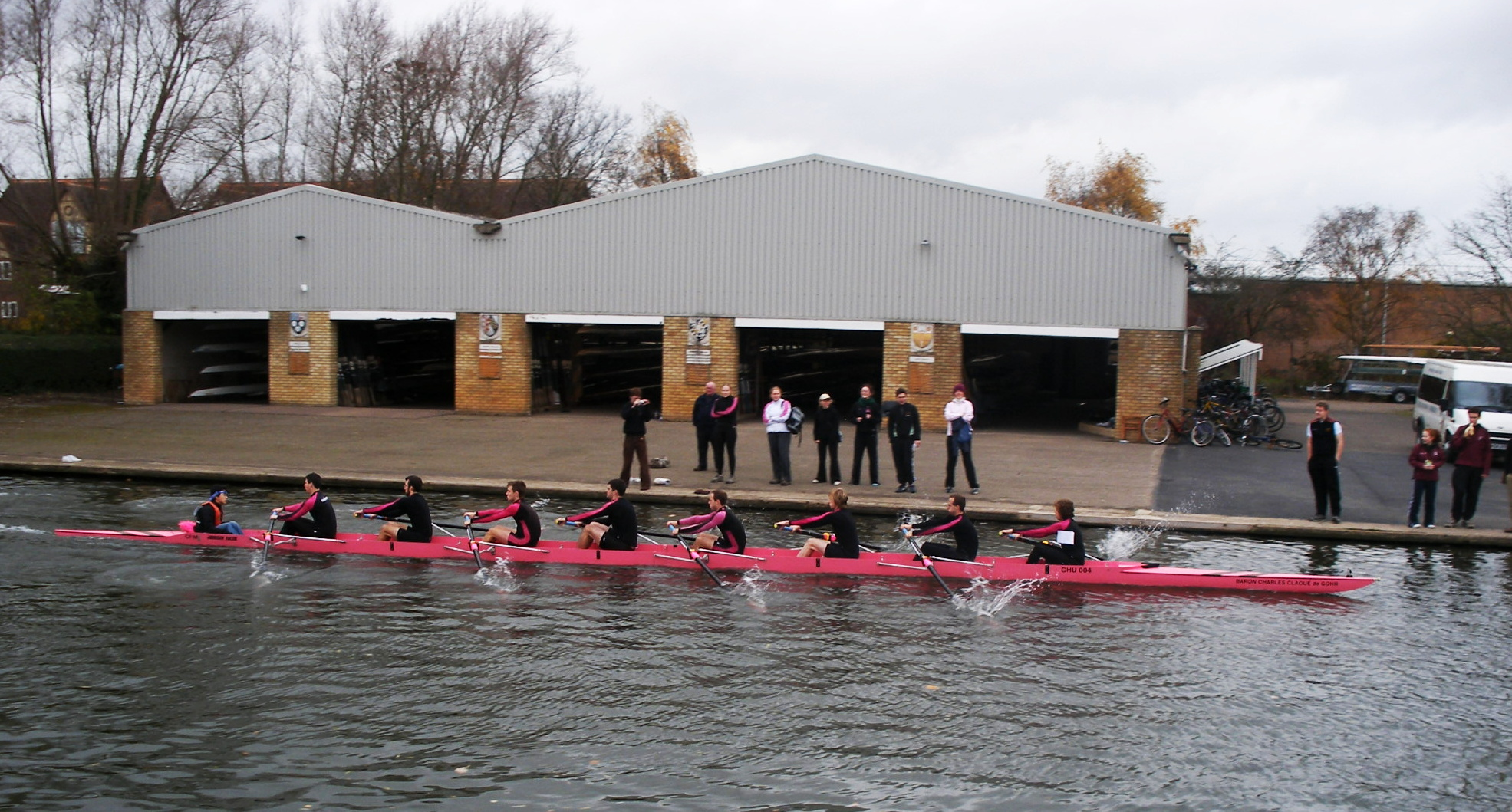
Churchill College Boat Club men's first VIII rowing past their boathouse on the River Cam. The club is noted for its pink boats.

With playing fields on site, unlike many other colleges, sport is an integral part of the college. As well as football pitches, a cricket pitch and others, the facilities include a gym, and tennis and squash courts.

Churchill College Football Club (CCFC) were the first college team to retain the Cambridge University Amateur Football League Division 1 title, winning it in 2005–06 and 2006–07. In the 2006–2007 season they also reached the final of Cuppers.

The college also has a successful boat club (Churchill College Boat Club) which in 2013 won the Pegasus Cup (This trophy is awarded annually to the most successful college boat club competing in the Cambridge May Bumping Races). In 2015, Churchill College Boat Club made history by being the first boat club at the university to win both the Pegasus Cup and Marconi Cup (This award is present to the most successful college boat club in the Lent Bumps) in the same year.

== Traditions ==
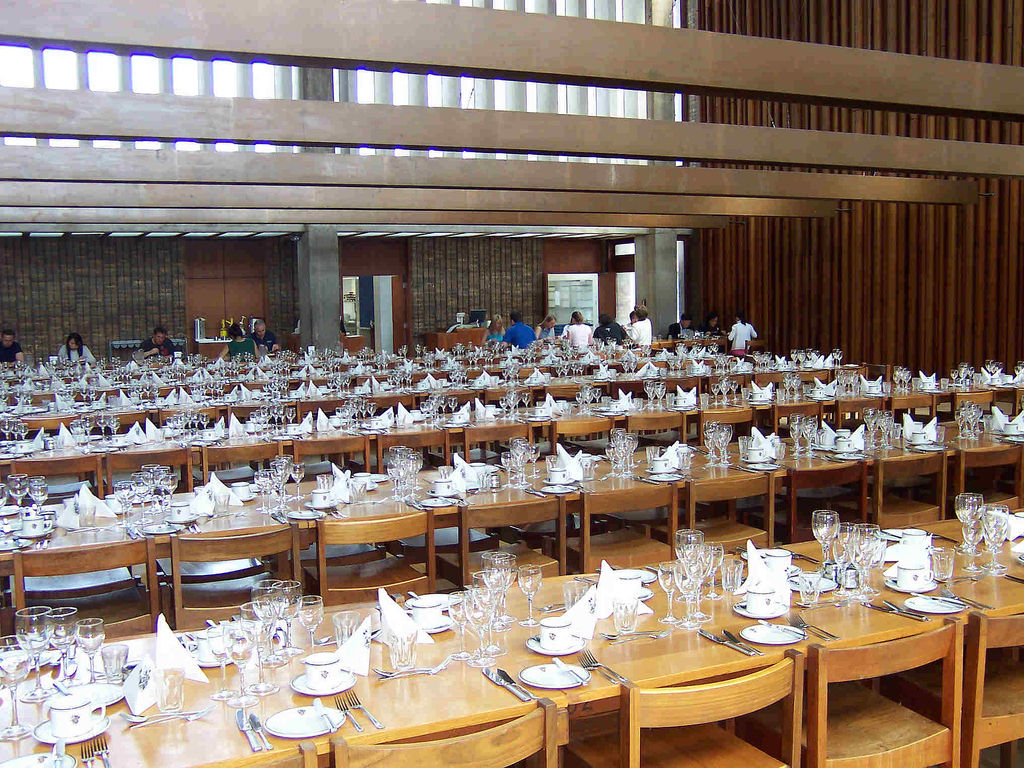
Churchill's Dining Hall is the largest in Cambridge.

Churchill is a relatively young college, and prides itself on being modern and forward looking. It has relatively few traditions. Informal hall (cafeteria-style dining period) was introduced in 1971, as an alternative to formal hall (fixed time, waiter service, all diners wearing gowns), and students are not required to wear gowns at formal halls, with exception of certain college feasts.

In special formal meals such as Matriculation Dinner or Scholars' Feast the Master usually raises a toast, first to "The King" and then to "Sir Winston". In other formal halls this is usually made by a senior student once the fellows have left. This latter tradition started in the early 2000s with the students customarily toasting in the reverse order: "Sir Winston", followed by "The Queen".

== People associated with the college ==
=== Masters ===
The Mastership of Churchill College is a Crown appointment. To date the college has had eight masters:

Name	Term of office	Notes
Sir John Cockcroft	1959–1967	Nobel Laureate in Physics, who split the atom.
Sir William Hawthorne	1968–1983	Engineer who helped develop the jet engine.
Sir Hermann Bondi	1983–1990	Cosmologist who helped develop the Steady State theory of the universe.
Lord Broers	1990–1996	Nanotechnologist; later Vice-Chancellor of the University of Cambridge (1996-2003).
Sir John Boyd	1996–2006	Formerly British ambassador to Japan (1992–1996).
Sir David Wallace	2006–2014	Formerly Vice-chancellor of Loughborough University (1994–2005); Director of the Newton Institute (2006–2011).
Dame Athene Donald	2014–2024	Professor of experimental physics at the Cavendish Laboratory.
Sharon Peacock	2024–	Professor of Public Health and Microbiology in the Department of Medicine at the University of Cambridge

The appointment of microbiologist Professor Sharon Peacock CBE FMedSci MRCP as 8th Master, with effect from October 2024, was announced in October 2023.

=== Notable fellows ===
See also Category:Fellows of Churchill College, Cambridge

- Raymond Allchin – British archaeologist and Indologist
- Michael Ashburner – Biologist, former head of the European Bioinformatics Institute and the European Molecular Biology Laboratory
- John Arundel Barnes – Social anthropologist
- Correlli Barnett – Military historian
- Jacques Barzun – Historian and cultural critic; (Extraordinary Fellow at Churchill while also Provost, Dean of Graduate studies, and Dean of Faculties at Columbia.)
- Piers Brendon – Writer and historian
- Edward Bullard – Geophysicist, former head of the National Physical Laboratory
- Edward Craig – Philosopher
- James Fox – Art historian and broadcaster
- George Gamow – Cosmologist (overseas fellow)
- Mark Goldie – Professor of Intellectual History
- Douglas Gough - Pioneer of helioseismology
- Priya Gopal – Teaching fellow in colonial and postcolonial literature
- Frank Hahn – Economist
- Archie Howie – Physicist
- Richard Keynes – Physiologist
- Julia King, Baroness Brown of Cambridge – Engineer, former Vice-Chancellor of Aston University
- John Kinsella – Poet and novelist
- Nigel Knight – Economist and political scientist
- Matthew Kramer – Political and legal and moral philosopher
- David Luscombe – Medieval historian
- C. B. Macpherson – Political scientist
- Peter Murray-Rust – Chemist
- David Newbery – Economist
- David Olive – Physicist
- Nick Petford – Geologist and Vice-Chancellor of the University of Northampton
- Roy Porter – Historian and prolific author
- Stephen Roskill – Naval historian
- Andrew Sinclair – Historian, novelist and journalist
- C. P. Snow – Physicist and novelist
- Franz Sondheimer – Organic chemist
- George Steiner – Literary critic and linguistic theorist (Extraordinary Fellow at Churchill)
- Sir Colin St John Wilson – Architect
- Sir David Spiegelhalter – Statistician
- Dick Tizard – Engineer
- Frank Gibbs Torto – Chemist
- Melissa Hines – Neuroscientist
- Stuart Warren – Organic chemist
- Chandra Wickramasinghe – Physicist and Astrobiologist
- Michael Young – Sociologist and politician
- Ghil'ad Zuckermann – Linguist and revivalist
- Sander van der Linden – Psychologist

=== Nobel laureates ===
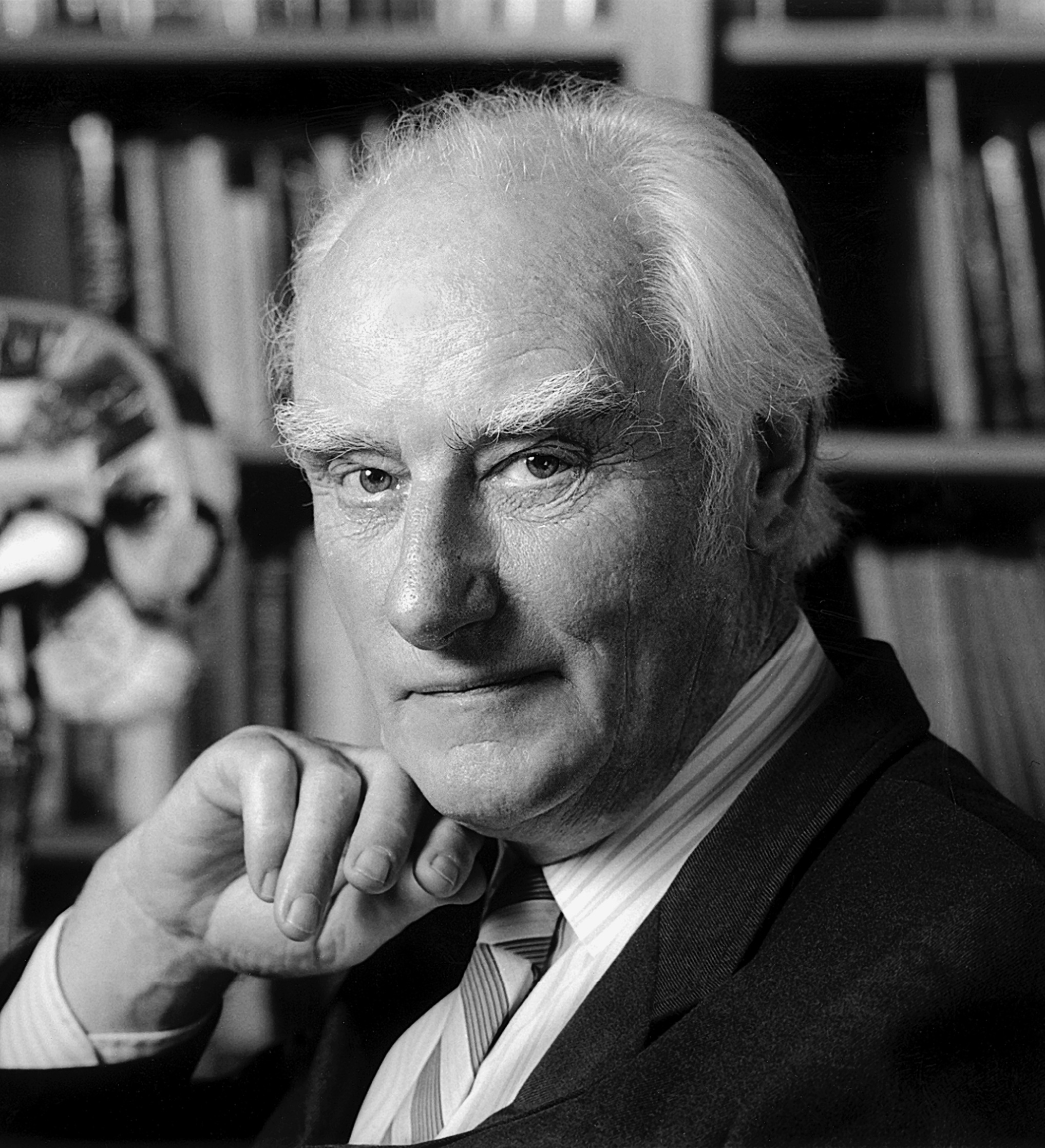
Francis Crick

Churchill College counts 32 Nobel Prize winners amongst its Fellowship, with nine awards in Physics, eight in Physiology/Medicine, seven in Economics, and four each in Chemistry and Literature.

- Philip Anderson (Overseas Fellow 1961–62): Physics, 1977 - Electronic structure of magnetic and disordered systems
- Kenneth Arrow (Overseas Fellow 1963–64, 1970, 1973, 1986; Honorary Fellow 2012): Economics, 1972 - Contributions to general economic equilibrium theory and welfare theory
- Felix Bloch (Overseas Fellow 1967): Physics, 1952 - New methods for nuclear magnetic precision measurements
- Sir Winston Churchill (Founder; Honorary Fellow 1965-66): Literature, 1953 - Mastery of historical and biographical description as well as brilliant oratory in defending exalted human values
- Sir John Cockcroft (First Master 1960–67): Physics, 1951 - The transmutation of atomic nuclei by artificially accelerated atomic particles
- Francis Crick (Fellow 1960–62; Honorary Fellow 1965–2004): Physiology/Medicine, 1962 - Co–discovering the structure of DNA
- Gérard Debreu (Overseas Fellow 1972): Economics, 1983 - New analytical methods in economic theory and reformulation of the theory of general equilibrium
- Angus Deaton (Overseas Fellow 1990–91): Economics, 2015 - Analysis of consumption, poverty, and welfare
- Peter Diamond (Overseas Fellow 1965–66): Economics, 2010 - Analysis of markets with search frictions
- Sir Robert Edwards (Fellow 1979–2013): Physiology/Medicine, 2010 - The development of in–vitro fertilisation
- Murray Gell-Mann (Overseas Fellow 1966): Physics, 1969 - Work on the theory of elementary particles
- Vitaly Ginzburg (Overseas Fellow 1967): Physics, 2003 - Contributions to the theory of superconductors and superfluids
- Sir John Gurdon (Fellow 1973–95; Honorary Fellow 2007–present): Physiology/Medicine, 2012 - The discovery that mature cells can be reprogrammed to become pluripotent
- Oliver Hart (Fellow 1975-81): Economics, 2016 - For work in the field of contracts
- Antony Hewish (Fellow 1961–2021): Physics, 1974 - Development of radio aperture synthesis and its role in the discovery of pulsars
- Roald Hoffmann (Overseas Fellow 1978): Chemistry, 1981 - Theory concerning the course of chemical reactions
- Pyotr Kapitsa (Honorary Fellow 1976–84): Physics, 1978 - Inventions and discoveries in the area of low–temperature physics
- James Watson (Overseas Fellow 1962): Physiology/Medicine, 1962 - Co–discovering the structure of DNA
- Har Gobind Khorana (Overseas Fellow 1967): Physiology/Medicine, 1968 - Interpretation of the genetic code and its function in protein synthesis
- Arthur Kornberg (Overseas Fellow 1970): Physiology/Medicine, 1959 - Discovery of mechanisms in the biological synthesis of DNA
- William Lipscomb (Overseas Fellow 1966): Chemistry, 1976 - Studies on the structure of boranes illuminating problems of chemical bonding
- Mario Vargas Llosa (Overseas Fellow 1977–78; Honorary Fellow 2012–present): Literature, 2010 - Cartography of structures of power and trenchant images of the individual's resistance, revolt, and defeat
- Eric Maskin (Overseas Fellow 1980–82): Economics, 2007 - Laying the foundations of mechanism design theory
- Sir Paul Nurse (Honorary Fellow 2010–present): Physiology/Medicine, 2001 - Discoveries of key regulators of the cell cycle
- Octavio Paz (Overseas Fellow 1970): Literature, 1990 - Impassioned writing with wide horizons, characterised by sensuous intelligence and humanistic integrity
- Robert Solow (Overseas Fellow 1983–84): Economics, 1987 - Contributions to the theory of economic growth
- Wole Soyinka (Overseas Fellow 1973–74; Honorary Fellow 2012–present): Literature, 1986 - In a wide cultural perspective and with poetic overtones he fashions the drama of existence
- David Thouless (Fellow 1961–65): Physics, 2016 - Theoretical discoveries of topological phase transitions and topological phases of matter
- Alec Todd (Founder Trustee; Honorary Fellow 1991–97): Chemistry, 1957 - Work on nucleotides and nucleotide co–enzymes
- Roger Y. Tsien (Postgraduate 1972–76; Honorary Fellow 2009–16): Chemistry, 2008 - The discovery and development of the green fluorescent protein
- George Wald (Overseas Fellow 1963–64): Physiology/Medicine, 1967 - Discoveries concerning the primary physiological and chemical visual processes in the eye
- Ernest Walton (By–Fellow 1972; Honorary Fellow 1989–95): Physics, 1951 - The transmutation of atomic nuclei by artificially accelerated atomic particles

=== Notable alumni ===
See also Category:Alumni of Churchill College, Cambridge

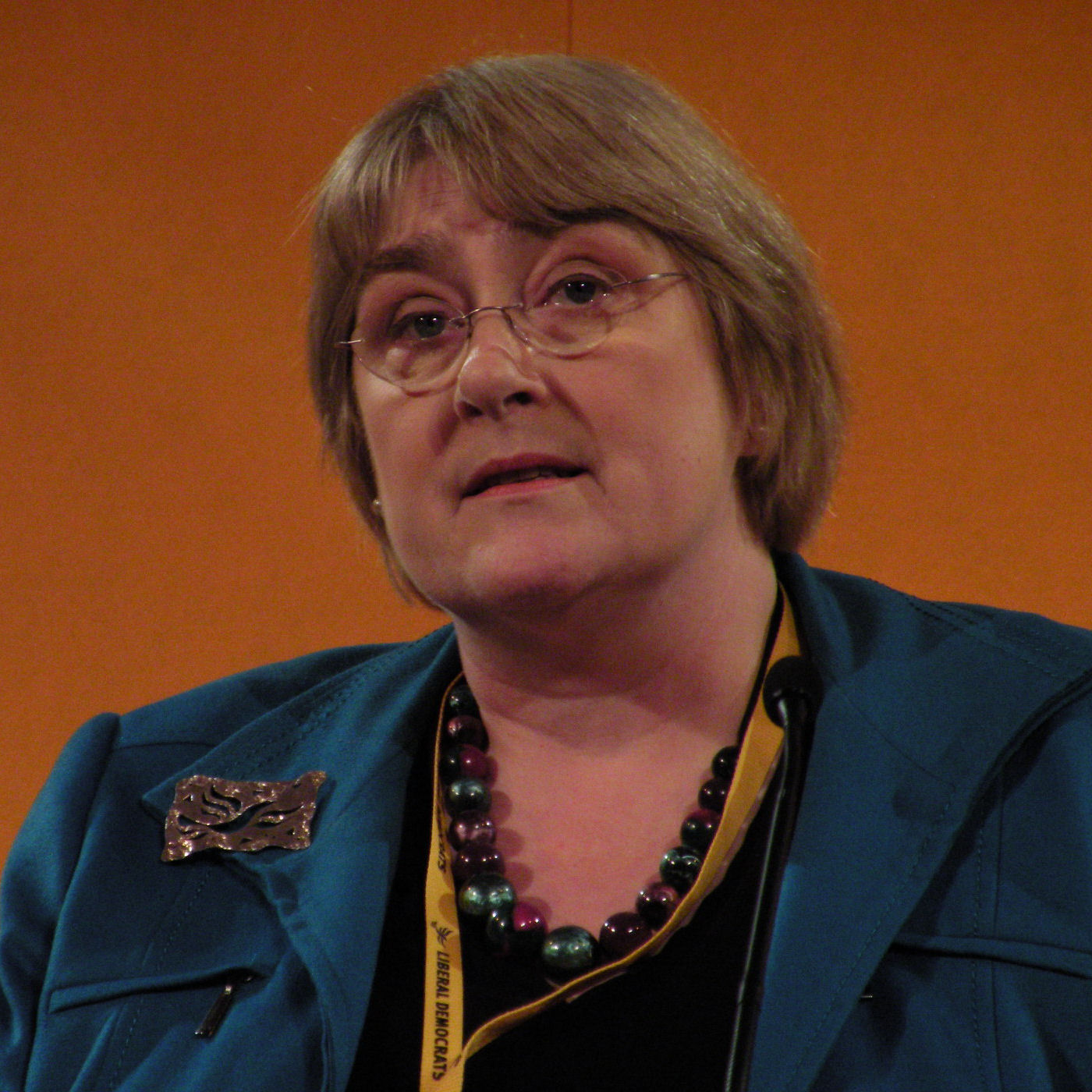
Liberal Democrat Peer Baroness Brinton

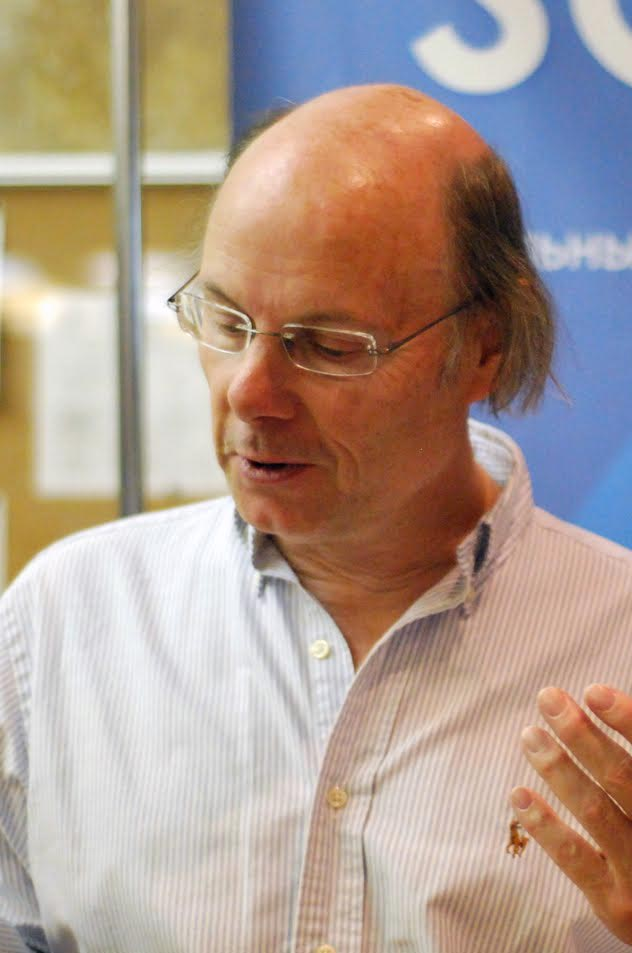
Inventor of C++ Bjarne Stroustrup

- Kari Blackburn – BBC World Service executive
- Baroness Brinton – Liberal Democrat peer
- Nick Brown – Principal of Linacre College, Oxford
- Michael Burrows – inventor of the first internet search machine, Alta Vista
- Peter Fincham – former controller, BBC1
- Sir Christopher Frayling – writer and educationalist
- Mike Gascoyne – Chief technical officer of the Caterham F1 Formula One team
- Sir Peter Gershon – author of the Gershon Review, chairman of Premier Farnell and Symbian Ltd.
- John Gladwin – Bishop of Chelmsford and Chair of Citizens Advice
- Catherine Green – biologist who worked on the production of the Oxford–AstraZeneca COVID-19 vaccine
- Michael Green – Lucasian Professor of Mathematics
- Charlie Hannaford – England rugby player
- Geoffrey M. Heal – Columbia University environmental economist
- Roger Helmer – UK Independence Party MEP
- Tim Jenkinson – Professor of Finance at the Saïd Business School
- Geoffrey King – geophysicist known for his work on Earthquake prediction
- Michael Li – Founder, The Data Incubator and data scientist
- Diarmaid MacCulloch – Historian
- Viscount Monckton – former Deputy leader of UKIP and policy advisor to Margaret Thatcher
- Christine E. Morris – Andrew A. David Professor in Greek Archaeology and History at Trinity College Dublin
- Simeon Nyachae – Kenyan minister and 2002 presidential candidate
- Brendan O'Neill – business executive
- James Owen – Theoretical Astrophysicist
- Andrew Parker – former Lord Chamberlain and Director General of the Security Service (MI5)
- David Thomas Pugh – English marine scientist (1943–2022)
- Luke Roberts – comedian
- Philip Sales – Supreme Court Justice
- Mark Smith – Academic, Vice-Chancellor of Lancaster University
- Ian Stewart – Mathematician
- Gavin Strang – Labour Member of Parliament (MP)
- Bjarne Stroustrup – inventor of C++
- Sir John Stuttard – a Lord Mayor of London
- Fabian Tassano – Economist and author
- Geoffrey Thomas – Former President of Kellogg College, Oxford
- Geoff Travis – Founder of Rough Trade Records label and shops
- Neil Turok – Mathematician
- Stephen Tweedie – Software developer
- Peter Wadhams – Oceanographer and glaciologist
- Rick Warden – Actor Band of Brothers, Rome
- Jeremy Warmsley – musician

== See also ==
- Churchill Scholarships for fourteen graduates from the United States
- Churchill College Boat Club
- Listed buildings in Cambridge (west)
