= Mont Tizard =

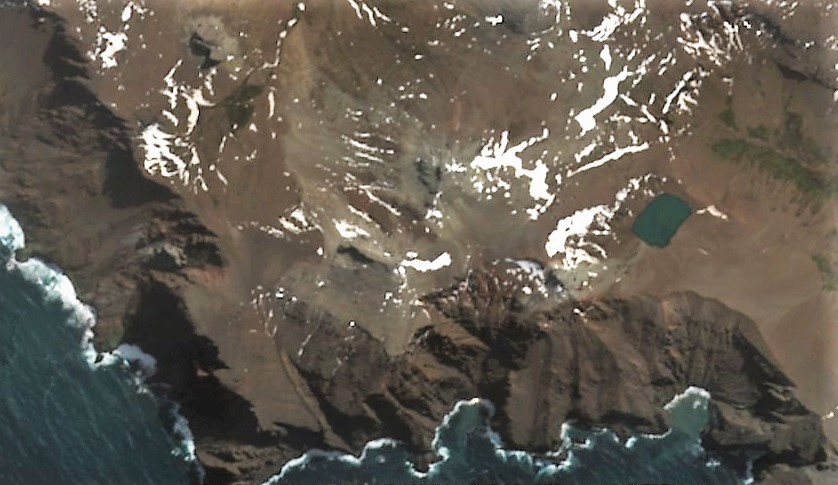
- Sentinel-2 picture centered on Mont Tizard

Highest point
- Elevation: 844 m (2,769 ft)
- Prominence: 369 m (1,211 ft)
- Coordinates: 49°41′57″S 70°00′52″E

Geography
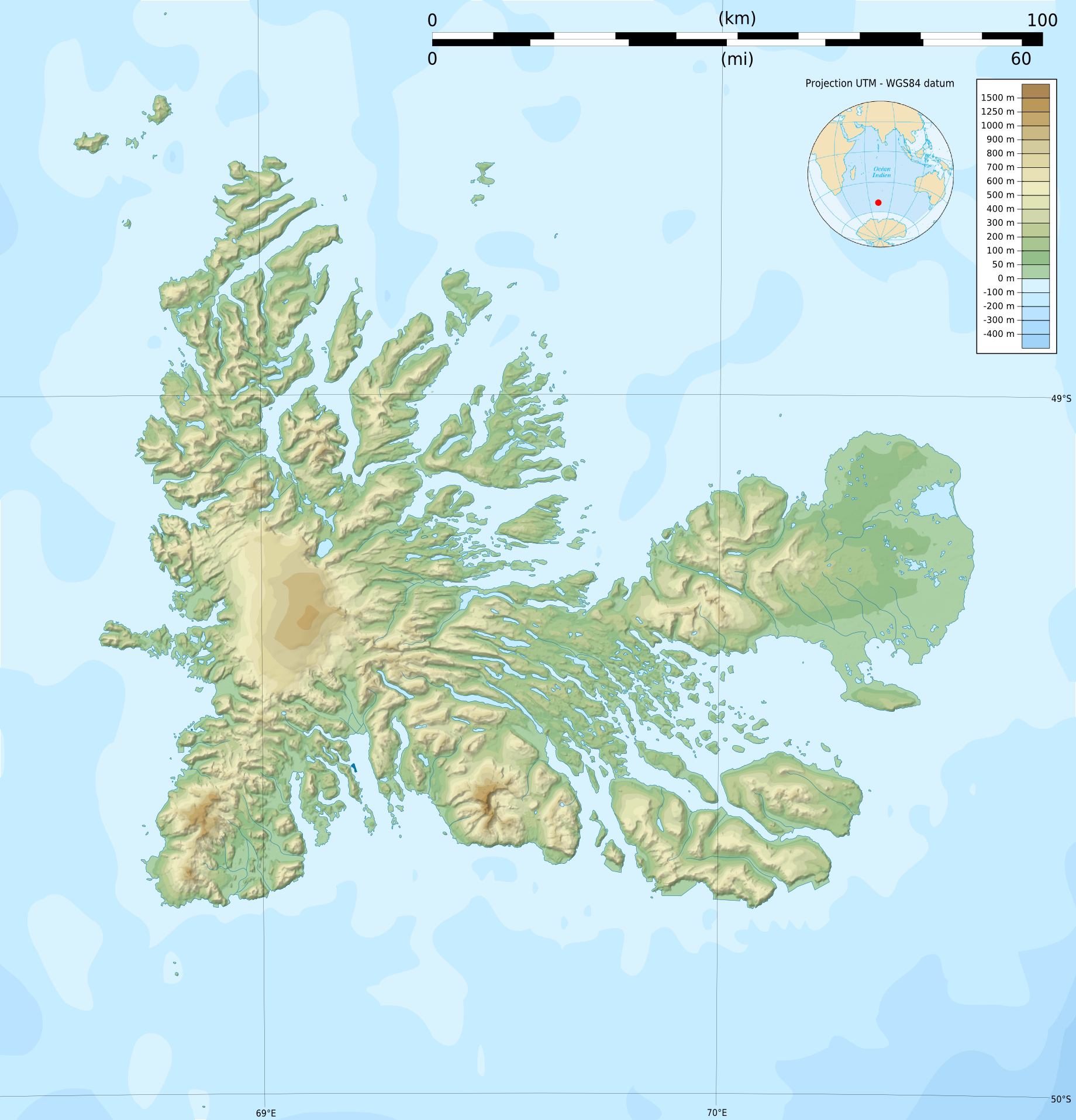
- Location within Kerguelen
- Location: Grande Terre, Kerguelen Islands, French Southern and Antarctic Lands

Climbing
- First ascent: Unknown

Mont Tizard is a mountain in the French Southern and Antarctic Lands. Located at the southern edge of the Joan of Arc Peninsula, Kerguelen, it rises to a height of 844 metres (2,769 ft) above sea level.

Mont Tizard is the highest point of the Joan of Arc Peninsula. It rises only 1.3 kilometers (0.81 mi) to the north of the seashore. A small mountain lake lies close to the eastern slope.

This mountain was named in 1874 during the Challenger expedition after Thomas Henry Tizard, second-in-command of the HMS Challenger.

== See also ==
- Toponymy of the Kerguelen Islands
