= Jack Tizard =

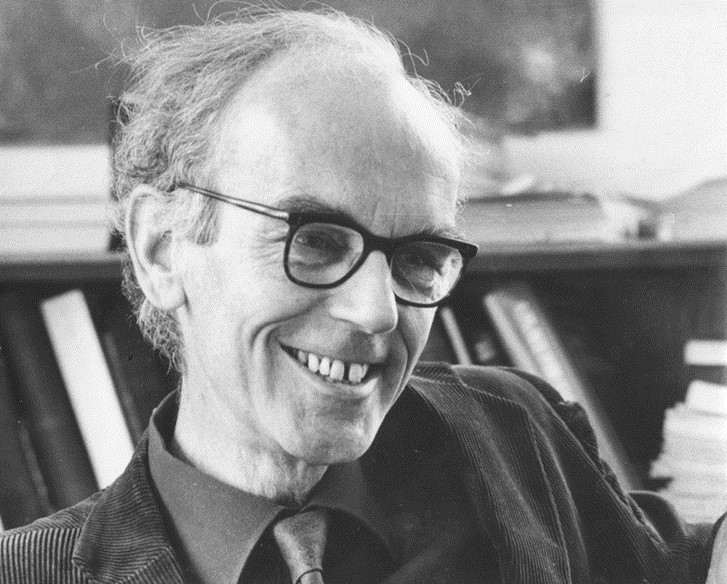
- Tizard in 1976
- Born: 25 February 1919
- Died: 2 August 1979 (aged 60)
- Occupation: Psychologist

Jack Tizard (25 February 1919 – 2 August 1979) was a New Zealand psychologist. He was president of the British Psychological Society.

== Career ==
Jack Tizard spent most of his professional life in England where, as a psychologist, he worked at the boundaries of psychology, medicine, education and the social sciences. His work on alternatives to institutional care in the 1950s and 1960s underpinned the subsequent development of ‘ordinary life’ models for children and adults with intellectual disabilities. Some of this work was with Neil O'Connor. Tizard's approach was characterised by a commitment to using high research standards to address important social problems, ensuring through his extensive advisory activities that the results of research were available to practitioners and policy-makers.

== Personal life ==
In 1947 Tizard married Barbara Patricia, the daughter of Herbert Parker, a journalist. She was also a psychologist and the couple had three children, two boys (one of whom died in 1983) and a girl, and two adopted children, one boy, who died in 1975, and one girl. Barbara died in 2015 at the age of 88.
