= Barbara Tizard =

British psychologist (1926–2015)

Barbara Patricia Tizard FBA FBPsS
- Born: Barbara Patricia Parker; 16 April 1926
- Died: 4 January 2015 (aged 88)

Academic background
- Education: Somerville College, Oxford

Academic work
- Discipline: Psychology
- Institutions: Institute of Psychiatry, University of London

Barbara Patricia Tizard, FBA, FBPsS (née Parker; 16 April 1926 – 4 January 2015) was a British psychologist and academic, specialising in developmental psychology. She was Director of the Thomas Coram Research Unit at the Institute of Education, University of London from 1980 to 1990, and Professor of Education from 1982 to 1990.

== Early life and education ==
Tizard was born on 16 April 1926 in West Ham, London, England. Her parents divorced when she was seven, and she was then raised by her single mother. Having won a scholarship, she was educated at St Paul's Girls' School, an all-girls private school in London. She matriculated into Somerville College, Oxford in 1944 to study medicine but changed to Philosophy, Politics and Economics (PPE) after a year. She graduated with a Bachelor of Arts (BA) degree. She later undertook part-time postgraduate studies at the University of London, and completed her Doctor of Philosophy (PhD) degree on the "psychological effects of brain damage".

== Academic career ==
Tizard was a lecturer at the Institute of Psychiatry between 1963 and 1967. She joined the Institute of Education (IOE), University of London in 1967. She was Director of the Thomas Coram Research Unit at the Institute of Education, from 1980 to 1990, and Professor of Education from 1982 to 1990. She retired from the IOE in 1990 and was appointed Professor Emeritus by the University of London.

== Personal life ==
The then Barbara Parker met Jack Tizard while she was studying at the University of Oxford. Unusually for the time, she was given permission to marry while still an undergraduate, and they did so in 1947. Together they had five children. Her husband predeceased her, dying in 1979.

== Honours ==
In 1997, Tizard was elected a Fellow of the British Academy (FBA), the United Kingdom's national academy for the humanities and social sciences. She was also an elected Fellow of the British Psychological Society (FBPsS).
