= Thomas Henry Tizard =

English naval officer and oceanographer (1839–1924)

Captain Thomas Henry Tizard CB FRS
- Born: 13 March 1839; Weymouth, Dorset, UK
- Died: 17 February 1924 (aged 84); Kingston upon Thames, UK
- Military career
- Allegiance: United Kingdom
- Branch: Royal Navy
- Service years: 1854 - 1907
- Rank: Captain

Thomas Henry Tizard CB FRS (1839 – 17 February 1924) was an English oceanographer, hydrographic surveyor, and navigator.

He was born in Weymouth, Dorset and educated at the Royal Hospital School, Greenwich, at that time noted for its advanced mathematical training. He entered the Royal Navy by competitive examination as master's assistant in 1854 and served in the Baltic during the Crimean War. In 1860 he was promoted second master and commenced surveying in the Rifleman Reed, during which time he commanded the tender Saracen for three years. Tizard was largely responsible for an important series of observations on the surface and under-currents in the Straits of Gibraltar, which set at rest the vexed question of the movements of these waters.

An atoll in the South China Sea that Tizard surveyed in the 1860s from aboard HMS Rifleman was later named Tizard Bank after him.

Towards the end of 1872 Tizard transferred to HMS Challenger. The appointment opened to him the greatest opportunity of his life in bringing him into contact with the leaders of the science of oceanography. The Challenger expedition resulted in a vast increase of knowledge of the physical condition of the oceans and of the distribution of marine life, and in the progressive improvement of apparatus and methods of research. Tizard remained with the Challenger until she paid off in 1876, and spent the next three years at the Admiralty writing the narrative of the voyage in association with Sir John Murray. Mont Tizard, a mountain in Kerguelen, was named after him.

In 1879 Tizard resumed surveying duties afloat, and took charge of the Home survey. He was at first in command of the hired vessel the Knight-Errant and then of HMS Triton (1882), the first British ship to be built specifically for survey work. During the nine years that he held this command he wrote many papers of scientific value and interest. Among these may be mentioned a report on deep-sea exploration in the Faroe Channel; lectures on Marine Surveying and Hydrographic Surveying, and an article on the 'Thames Estuary' (Nature, 1890) which is of great permanent value. He was promoted to staff captain in 1889, and in 1891 was appointed assistant hydrographer of the navy, and was elected a Fellow of the Royal Society. He was appointed Companion of the Order of the Bath (CB) in the 1899 Birthday Honours.

In 1881 Tizard married Mary Elizabeth Churchward. They had five children, including one son, Sir Henry Tizard.

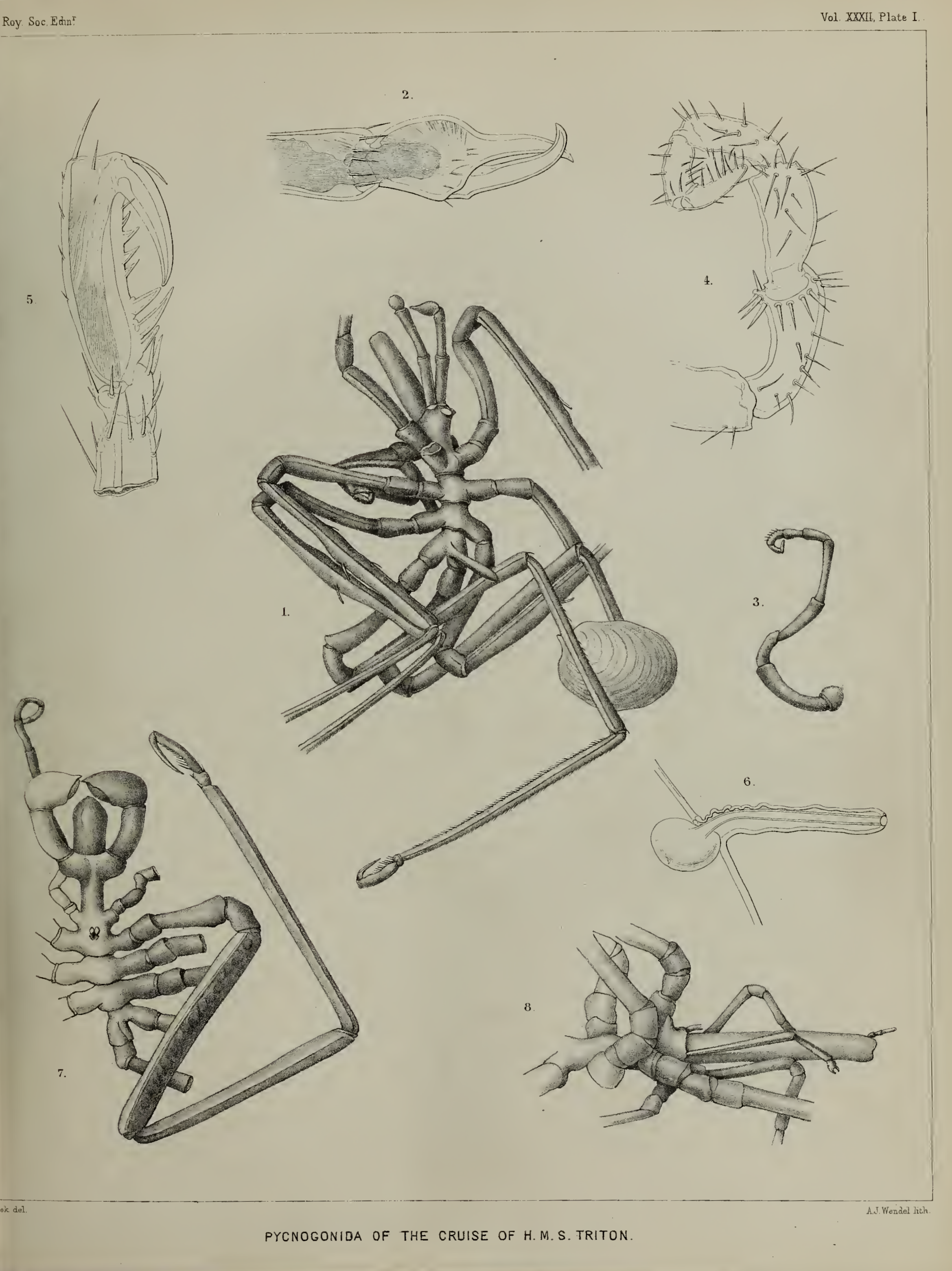
Pycnogonida (sea spiders) dredged by HMS Triton in the Faroe Channel in 1882

Nautical chart of Yarmouth and Lowestoft Roads surveyed by Tizard in HMS Triton in 1885

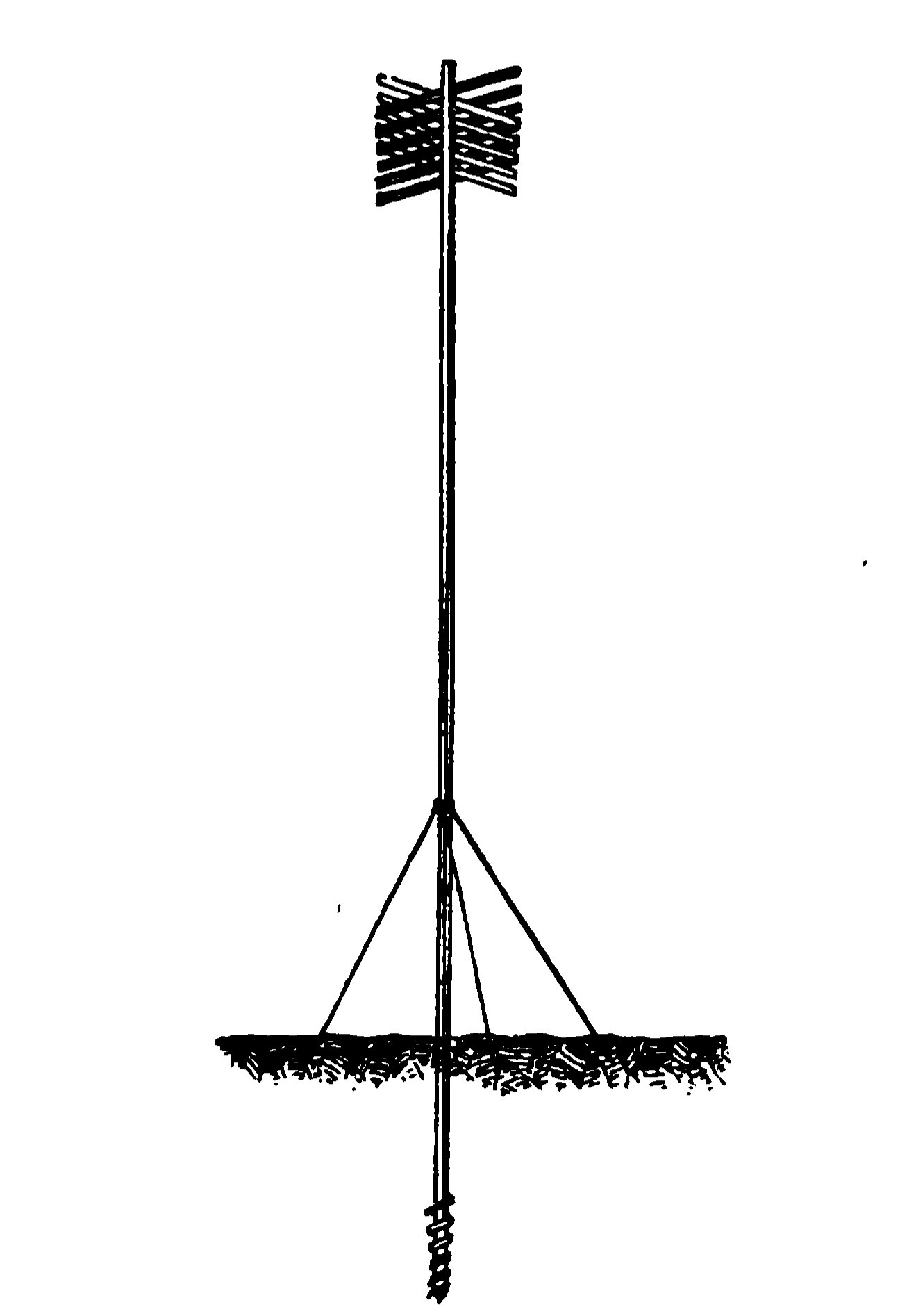
Surveying Beacon used on the sand flats of the Thames estuary. From Tizard (1891)
