= 48 Storey's Way =

House in Cambridge, England

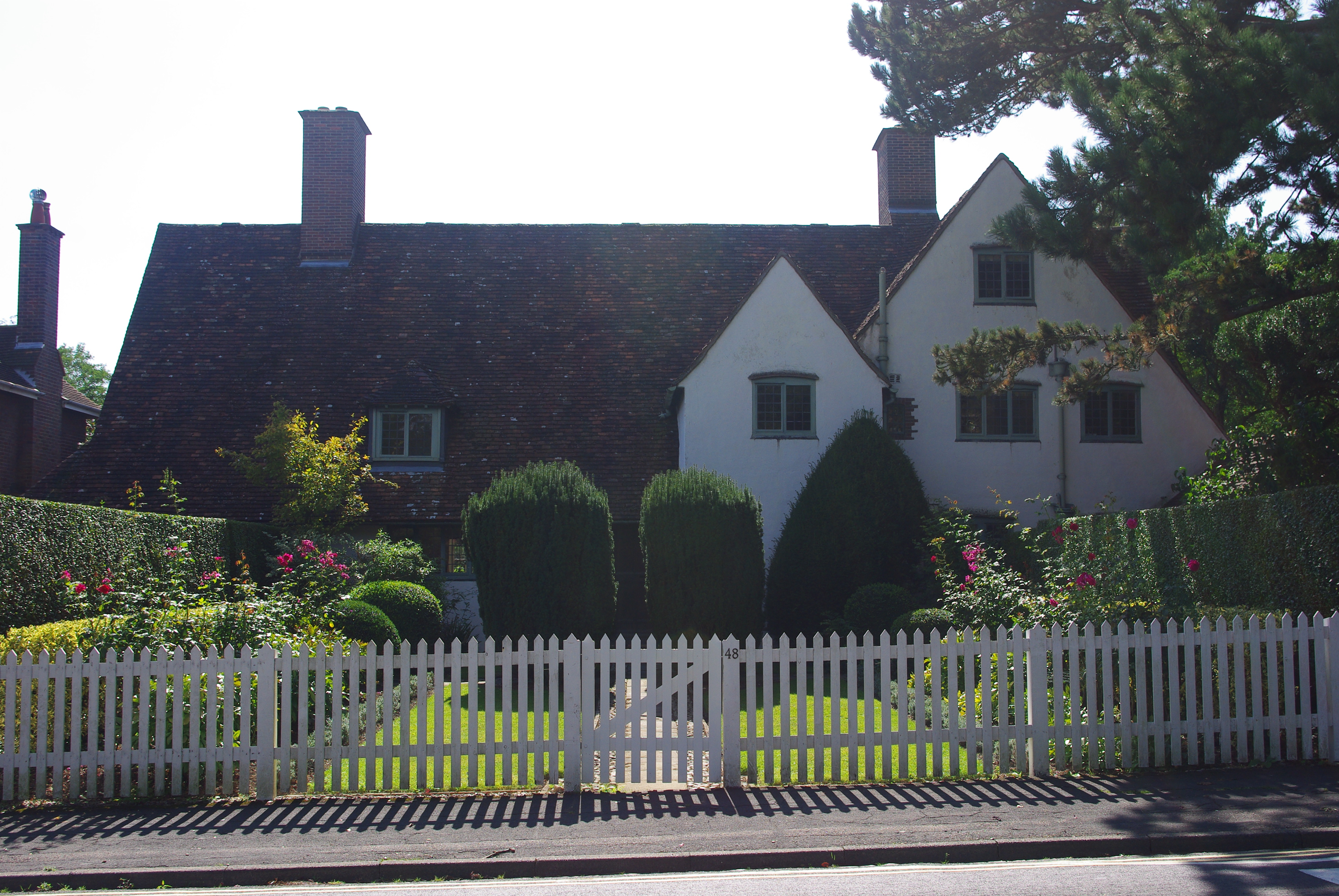
48 Storey's Way, Cambridge

48 Storey's Way is an Arts and Crafts house in west Cambridge, England, designed by M. H. Baillie Scott for Herbert Ainslie Roberts, a university administrator, and built in 1912–13. The architectural historian Alan Powers considers it an archetype of the English Arts and Crafts movement, although it is a late example of that movement. It is listed at grade II*.

== Background ==
Storey's Way is one of the few 19th/early-20th-century developments in west Cambridge not associated with one of the colleges, the other being Selwyn Gardens, off Grange Road, developed from the late 1880s. Storey's Charity dates from 1692, with the will of Edward Storey. As a result of the Enclosure Award of 1805, the charity was allocated an L-shaped piece of farmland in the north west of Cambridge and, early in the 20th century, the charity's trustees decided to develop 35 acres for housing. A total of 74 individual plots of 0.25–1.0 acres were advertised; eighteen had sold by 1914 but the First World War interrupted proceedings and sales dragged on until 1932. The bulk of the plots were small, catering for a shift in demand towards smaller homes with fewer live-in servants. The terms of sale required houses to cost £800 or £1000 (later £1000 or £1200), depending on the size of the plot – relatively expensive for the time – and also to stand at least 30 feet from the street. Building started in 1910 and eleven houses had been built before the First World War; the majority were completed by 1930. The Z-shaped Storey's Way was built in 1910 or 1911 to serve the development; it connects Huntingdon Road with Madingley Road, with the southern part cutting through land belonging to St John's College.

The development was in a rural area, beyond the extent of building along the Huntingdon and Madingley Roads, with only a handful of nearby buildings pre-dating it. To the west of the road was the chapel of rest of the parish of St Giles and St Peter's burial ground, dating from around 1875, possibly by Richard Reynolds Rowe. To the north (south of Huntingdon Road) stood a group of houses associated with the Darwin family, including The Grove (1813), once home of Darwin's widow, Emma (now part of Fitzwilliam College); The Orchard (1882), built for Horace Darwin (now demolished but forms the site of Murray Edwards College); and Wychfield House (1884), built for Francis Darwin (now part of Trinity Hall). The northern part of Storey's Way is now a conservation area, encompassing the entire original development.

The architect, M. H. Baillie Scott, though not among the founders of the Arts and Crafts movement in England, became one of its major later exponents. He designed a total of thirteen houses in Cambridge, nine of which are in west Cambridge, with a cluster of five on Storey's Way, the others being numbers 29 (1922), 30 (1914), 54 (1922) and 56 (1923). Other non-local architects contributing to the original development include T. D. Atkinson and Arthur Hamilton Moberly, with two neo-Georgian houses, numbers 63 (1912) and 76 (1913), respectively, while the local architect H. C. Hughes produced a cottage orné design for number 25 (1924). The Letchworth firm Bennett & Bidwell designed no. 52 and the London firm Dunnage & Hartman no. 44, both dating from 1913.

The client, Herbert Ainslie Roberts (1864–1932), was a former mathematics teacher at Bath College, who was secretary of the university's appointments board in 1902–32, and was elected a fellow of Gonville and Caius College in 1927. His family included his wife (Mary Violet née Maxwell 1864-1958) and son, Patrick, who was killed in a car crash in Greece in 1937. Mary Roberts played a somewhat strange role in the 1941 Hess affair, acting as a conduit/postbox between Albrecht Haushofer, Hess's foreign affairs expert, and the 14th Duke of Hamilton. She was interviewed by MI5 in Cambridge on 16 May 1941. Roberts' eldest brother, Ernest Stewart Roberts, was the Master of Gonville and Caius (1903–12) and Vice-Chancellor of the university (1906–8).

== History ==
Number 48, (then 33) was built in 1912–13, near Storey's Lane's western bend, at TL4357259503. By the end of the 1930s it was the home of Ashley Tabrum, who was Cambridgeshire County Council's clerk for more than thirty years. It was on the market in 1957, when it was advertised as having four principal and two or three other bedrooms, two bathrooms and a garage. The site between Storey's Lane and Madingley Road (immediately south and west of number 48) was developed as Churchill College between 1959 and 1968. 48 Storey's Lane was first listed in 1967, then at grade II.

The house came on the market in 1990, with an advertised price of £350,000. By that time, the original kitchen and scullery had been amalgamated into a kitchen–breakfast room; there were five first-floor bedrooms and two bathrooms, with two bedrooms and a bathroom in the attic storey. The house was dilapidated, and required a new roof and heating system, as well as electrical rewiring. It was purchased by Churchill College, who intended to divide it for student accommodation, but were persuaded of its architectural merit by the architect Diane Haigh, whom they commissioned to restore it in 1990–91, together with William Fawcett of Allies & Morrison. The pair also restored four other Baillie Scott houses in Cambridge during the 1990s. After the restoration, number 48 housed Churchill's bursar, Michael Allen, and his family. The college sold the house in 2000; the advertised price of around £1 million was then one of the highest prices for a house in Cambridge.

== Description ==
=== Exterior ===
48 Storey's Way is a narrow rectangular brick house of two storeys plus attic under a steeply pitched tiled roof, with two tall chimneys. The style is Arts and Crafts, and apart from the chimneys, the exterior is rendered and white washed. The entrance (north-east) face is highly asymmetric with two prominent gabled bays to the right of the centrally placed entrance, while on the left, the roof reaches the ground-floor storey, occupying two-thirds of the total height, with a single dormer window. The rightmost gabled bay has two-and-a-half storeys, and the smaller projecting middle one is of two storeys. The chimneys are also asymmetrically arranged, with the left one rising from the ridge line but the right one interrupting the garden-face roof. To the left of the main entrance are three ground-floor windows of one, three, and five lights, and another door. The middle bay has a small ground-floor window, which is set very low, and a two-light first-floor window. The rightmost bay has two ground-floor windows (of two lights and three lights), two similar first-floor windows, with a single two-light window at the attic level. The middle rail of the three-panelled, studded entrance door is carved with bunches of grapes and foliage.

The two-and-a-half-storey garden face is broadly symmetrical, with the roof only reaching the first-floor height. There are five bays, with the central door being surrounded by canted, flat-topped bay windows, and the outermost two bays having mullion-and-transom windows of different widths (three lights on the left and four lights on the right). The first-floor fenestration is symmetrical, with a central two-light window above the door, paired six-light windows slightly eccentrically set over the bay windows, and paired four-light windows to the outer bays; all these windows are placed close under the eaves. At attic level, there are two dormer windows.

=== Interior ===
The interior follows a typical plan of an Arts and Crafts house, with the principal rooms having a south aspect, overlooking the rear garden, and arranged in a row. The dining room and living room are adjacent, connected by large double doors that fold back to open up the space. The ceiling and frieze in the dining room by J. C. Pocock imitate 17th-century plasterwork, and feature a star-like pattern with Tudor rose bosses. The dining room has a panelled wall with a stone fireplace, and there is an inglenook fireplace in the living room. The ceilings of the living room, study, and internal hall all have exposed beams. Most of the floors are of wooden boards, with one of the halls having flagstones and the larder red tiles. The kitchen retains the service bell with its indicator board. In addition to the main rooms, Baillie Scott's original ground-floor plan included a scullery, larder, and pantry adjacent to the kitchen, an internal bicycle store accessed from the front via the left-hand door.

On the first floor the original plan had four bedrooms, two dressing rooms, and a single bathroom, with all the bedrooms overlooking the garden. The bedrooms retain brick fireplaces. The attic rooms are accessed via two separate staircases, one at each end of the house.

== See also ==
- Listed buildings in Cambridge (west)
