= Listed buildings in Cambridge (west) =

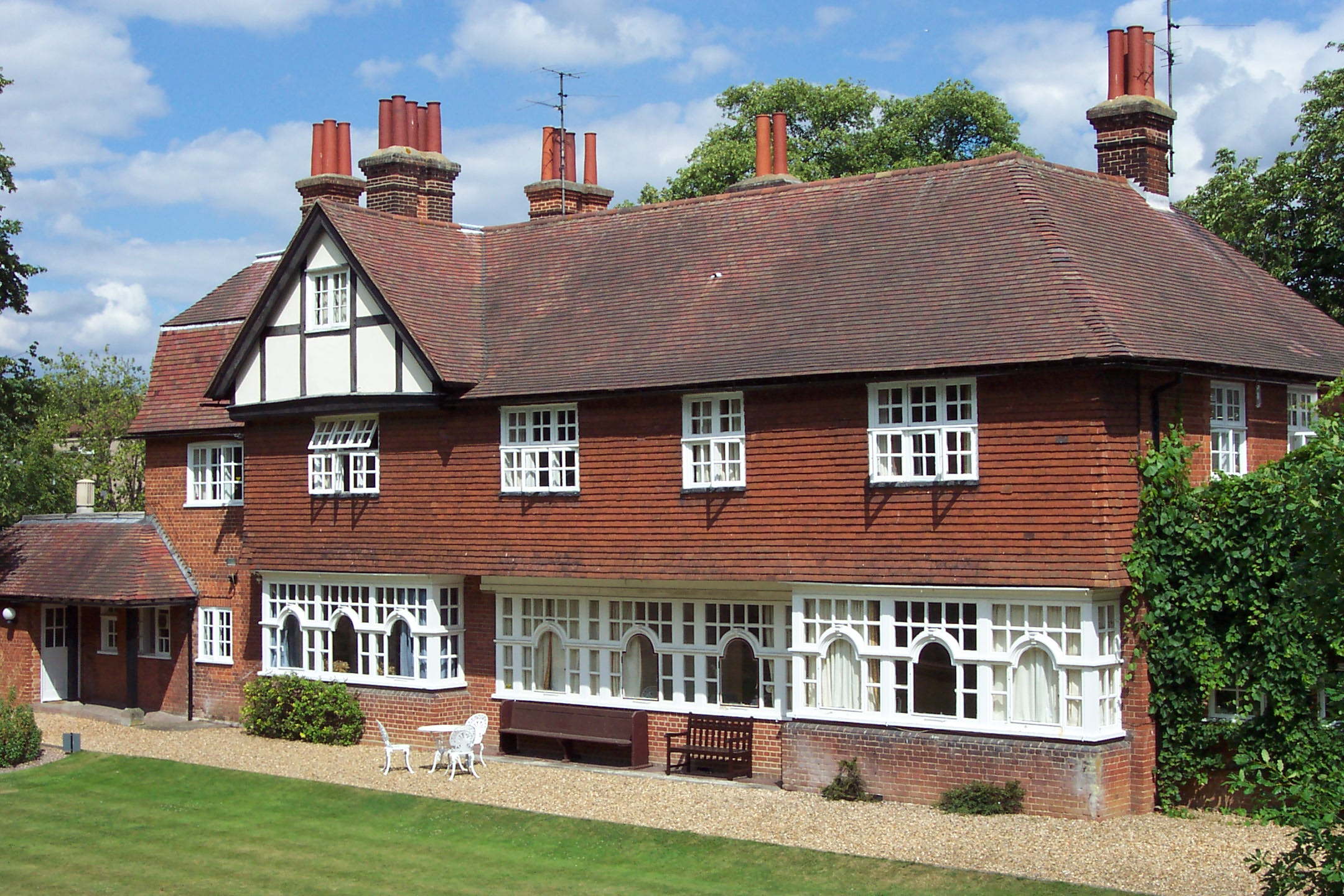
Elmside by E. S. Prior (now part of Clare Hall) is an example of a grade-II-listed Arts and Crafts house in this area.

There are 833 listed buildings (as of December 2023) in the district of Cambridge, England. This list summarises the 87 in the west and north-west suburbs, in the area west of the Backs and broadly between Huntingdon Road, Queen's Road, Barton Road and the M11. This was the West Fields, which largely passed into the ownership of the Cambridge colleges, particularly St John's, after enclosure in 1805, and was little developed until after 1870; the older population centres of Castle Hill and Newnham are excluded from this list. The major roads are Madingley Road running east–west and Grange Road running north–south. There are 18 buildings listed at grade II*, with the remainder at grade II; there are no grade-I-listed buildings in this area.

Many of the listed buildings and structures are associated with the university, its colleges and the theological colleges. The earliest university building was the Observatory, built north of Madingley Road in 1822–24 on a green-field site, then far from the town. In the 1870s, several new colleges were founded in the south of the area: Newnham College (1875), Ridley Hall (1877) and Selwyn College (1879), followed in the 1890s by theological colleges to the north: Westminster College (1896) and St Edmund's House (1896). Clare College was the first to build accommodation west of Queen's Road with Memorial Court (from 1923), and the University Library moved to a new building on an adjacent site off West Road in 1931–34. Development recommenced in the 1950s; the university built a large arts site off Sidgwick Avenue from 1954, and several new university colleges were founded within the area: Churchill College (1959), New Hall (now Murray Edwards College; 1962), Clare Hall (1966) and Robinson College (1977). Established colleges also added sites: Gonville and Caius's Harvey Court by the University Library (1960–62), and Corpus Christi's Leckhampton site west of Grange Road (1963–64).

A few listed villas pre-date the Observatory, the earliest being 35 Madingley Road of around 1800. Residential development in the area accelerated in the late 19th century, when substantial detached family houses set in large plots of 0.5–1.0 acres or more were built to accommodate married academics and well-off professionals, often designed by well-known London-based architects, including M. H. Baillie Scott, J. J. Stevenson and E. S. Prior. Most of the houses are traditional in appearance, including Arts and Crafts and Queen Anne styles. Plots were leased under restrictive terms that required the development of expensive high-quality houses, often specifying the use of red brick (rather than the local pale gault brick) with a tiled roof. The White House, Cambridge's first house in the International Style, was built in 1930–31 in the north-west of the area on Conduit Head Road, which has a group of 1930s Modernist houses. The most-recent listed building, and the only listed commercial building in this area, is the Schlumberger Gould Research Centre of 1982–84, a high-tech structure by Michael Hopkins.

== Listed buildings and structures ==
Grade	Criteria
Grade II*	Particularly important buildings of more than special interest
Grade II	Buildings of special interest

Name	Photograph	Grade	Date (Note: Dates in Bradley & Pevsner are preferred where there is a conflict.)	Location (Note: The precise location is given first as a grid reference, based on the British national grid reference system (or OSGB36) of the Ordnance Survey, and second as World Geodetic System 84 coordinates, used by the Global Positioning System. Data derive from the grid references at Historic England's National Heritage List for England.)	Architect	Style	Description
Gas lamp post, Clare Road	Gas lamp post, Clare Road	II	c. 1889	Clare Road; TL4419957618; 52.197926°N 0.108435°E	Cambridge University and Town Gas Light Company		Cast-iron gas lamp, still working at the date of listing (2010), with a fluted post, slightly wider at the base than the top. The lantern, a truncated square-based pyramid finished with a finial, sits on four curved rests. Below the lantern is a projecting bar, intended for supporting a ladder.
3 Clarkson Road	3 Clarkson Road	II	1958	Clarkson Road; TL4386858809; 52.208728°N 0.104101°E	Trevor Dannatt	Scandinavian-influenced Modern	Two-storey rectangular house on a sloping site, under a flat roof with one chimney. It is of dark-painted concrete-block construction, with the projecting first floor covered in vertically oriented cedar cladding. The windows are placed asymmetrically, with several tall narrow windows and a horizontal strip window that runs around a corner.
White House	White House, Conduit Head Road	II	1931	Conduit Head Road–Madingley Road; TL4284259307; 52.213469°N 0.089306°E	George Checkley	International Modern style	Rectangular Cubist house, in white-rendered brick on a concrete frame; it has two or three storeys with a flat roof and a roof terrace.
Salix (Brandon Hill/House)	Salix, Conduit Head Road	II	1934	Conduit Head Road; TL4284359361; 52.213954°N 0.089343°E	H. C. Hughes	International Modern style	L-shaped house, in white-rendered brick on a concrete frame; it has two storeys with a flat roof and a roof terrace, and multiple prominent corner windows.
Willow House (Thurso)	Willow House, Conduit Head Road	II*	1933	Conduit Head Road; TL4286959393; 52.214235°N 0.089737°E	George Checkley	International Modern style	White-rendered two-storey house on a concrete frame with brick infill, under a flat roof with a parapet. There is a single-storey extension. The garden face has a prominent cantilevered balcony.
Spring House	Spring House	II	1967	Conduit Head Road; TL4292259520; 52.215362°N 0.090566°E	Colin St John Wilson		L-shaped pale-brick house and artist's studio, under pantiled monopitched roofs, supported by timber columns, some of which are exposed. On the garden face, a corner is cut out for a roofed terrace, and there is a balcony.
Shawms	Shawms	II*	1938	Conduit Head Road; TL4280659562; 52.21577°N 0.088887°E	M. J. Blanco White	Modern Movement	Two-storey timber-framed rectangular house under a flat roof with a parapet and roof-top conservatory. The house is finished with horizontally oriented weatherboard cladding.
Five Gables	Five Gables	II	1898	Grange Road; TL4397857557; 52.197436°N 0.105178°E	Baillie Scott	Arts and Crafts	Red-brick two-storey house, on an asymmetrical plan, under a tiled roof with a high chimney. The upper storey is mainly roughcast rendered, except for below the chimney, and the gables are also half-timbered. Some of the windows incorporate a heart motif. It is the first of Baillie Scott's prolific works in Cambridge.
Upton House	Upton House	II	1912	Grange Road; TL4390957640; 52.1982°N 0.104204°E	Algernon Winter Rose	Neo-Georgian, with Arts and Crafts influences	Rectangular house of two storeys plus attics, now divided into three dwellings. It is predominantly in buff gault brick with red-brick and tile dressings, under a deep tiled roof with four high chimneys. The asymmetrical eight-bay front face places the main entrance left of centre, flanked by oval windows; the large and ornate doorcase has pilasters and a fanlight with a frieze above, surmounted by an arched pediment, with a small under-eaves window to the first floor. At the attic level are several small dormers, placed erratically, and a prominent red-brick belvedere-attic finished with ball finials. There is a loggia to the south east (left). The seven-bay symmetrical garden front features a full-height central canted projecting bay, finished with ball finials.
Entrance range of Selwyn College	Selwyn gatehouse	II	1882	Grange Road; TL4399757950; 52.200962°N 0.105623°E	Arthur Blomfield	Tudor Revival style	The college entrance range facing Grange Road has three storeys plus attics in red brick with stone dressings. Its central four-storey crenellated gatehouse has a single slim octagonal crenellated turret on its left, breaking the symmetry of the face. Above the arched entrance is a two-storey mullioned and transomed oriel window; the window under the battlements is decorated with tracery. The symmetrical outer wings each have gabled bays and three high chimneys.
Master's Lodge, Selwyn College	Selwyn Master's Lodge	II	1884	Grange Road–Sidgwick Avenue; TL4406657920; 52.200674°N 0.106619°E	Arthur Blomfield	Tudor Revival style	The master's lodge, in red brick with stone dressings, stands next to the chapel in Old Court. The style is similar to Blomfield's other buildings for the college. It has three storeys plus attics, with high chimneys. The main (west) face has projecting gabled end wings and a prominent Gothic central porch.
North range of Selwyn College	Selwyn north range	II	1889	Grange Road; TL4404557989; 52.2013°N 0.106341°E	Arthur Blomfield	Tudor Revival style	The college north range in Old Court has three storeys plus attics in red brick with stone dressings, and high chimneys. The five-bay central section has a projecting gabled bay, two windows wide, flanked by two single-window projecting gabled bays. The range terminates in gabled projecting wings, two windows wide.
Selwyn College Chapel	Selwyn College Chapel	II	1895	Grange Road; TL4407757945; 52.200896°N 0.10679°E	Arthur Blomfield	Tudor Revival style/Perpendicular style	The college chapel, in red brick with stone dressings, faces the gatehouse across Old Court. The six-bay building resembles King's Chapel, with a high west front flanked with turrets, and pinnacles at the rear; the bay nearest the front (west) has no window. The interior has stained glass by Charles Kempe and F. W. Skeat.
Selwyn College Hall	Selwyn hall	II	1909	Grange Road–Sidgwick Avenue; TL4403457912; 52.200611°N 0.106148°E	Grayson and Ould	17th century/Jacobean Revival style	The college dining hall, in red brick with stone dressings, is on the south side of Old Court. The two-storey building places the hall above a half-basement, with the elevated Jacobean-style main entrance accessed via a prominent bidirectional stone staircase. The main hall section has a decorative stone openwork parapet. The interior has oak panelling with a pediment and pilasters dated 1708, from the demolished St Mary's Church, Rotterdam.
Gate and screen, Selwyn College	Selwyn gate and screen (centre right), with the chapel (right) and north range (left)	II	1932 or 1939	Grange Road; TL4406857968; 52.201105°N 0.106668°E	T. H. Lyon		The gate to the gardens in Old Court, between the college chapel and the north range. The wrought-iron gates have an overthrow and stone-faced brick gate piers topped with vases. The wrought-iron railings surmount a low red-brick wall. (Note: The listing states the architect was Blomfield and the date 1882–89, but this is contradicted in Bradley & Pevsner (which gives 1932) and Selwyn College's website (which gives 1939).)
George Thomson Building, Leckhampton, Corpus Christi College	George Thomson Building (left)	II	1964	Grange Road (Leckhampton Site); TL4369057995; 52.201447°N 0.101153°E	Philip Dowson (Arup Associates)		Two linked offset blocks of graduate accommodation for Corpus Christi College, a five-storey square and a four-storey rectangle, resting on a brick platform. The blocks each have a white H-frame exoskeleton in reinforced concrete, with the building supported around 2 feet 6 inches inside; the ground floor is inset further. The individual bays have floor-to-ceiling windows and are delineated by vertical members, with shaped horizontal beams with flared ends at each storey, and a second slimmer concrete balustrade-like rail above. The blocks are connected by a staggered service section of dark-red brick.
48 Grange Road	48 Grange Road	II	c. 1880	Grange Road; TL4401558205; 52.203264°N 0.105994°E	Probably Basil Champneys	Queen Anne style	Red-brick house of two storeys plus attics, under a tiled roof with two chimneys. The central two bays in the four-bay symmetrical south face are slightly recessed, with a central dormer and small circular windows to both main storeys. The gabled end bays have two-storey canted bay windows, with the central windows having arched tops; there are similar triple windows to both main storeys at the rear; to their right is the entrance door, topped by a prominent hood. Now accommodation for St Catherine's College.
Elmside	Elmside	II	1885	Grange Road–Herschel Road; TL4395658303; 52.204159°N 0.105173°E	Edward Schroeder Prior	Arts and Crafts	Rectangular red-brick house mainly of two storeys plus attics, under a complex tiled roof, incorporating a mansard roof, with five chimneys. Much of the first and attic floors features tile hanging, particularly at the rear. The garden face has a half-timbered gable and three Venetian windows occupying most of the ground floor. The entrance (east) face has a pediment-topped Venetian window. Now forms part of Clare Hall.
Robinson College	Robinson College (front) Robinson College (rear)	II*	1980	Grange Road–Herschel Road; TL4387358353; 52.20463°N 0.10398°E	Andy MacMillan, Isi Metzstein (Gillespie, Kidd & Coia)		The concrete-framed college buildings form doubled L-shape, under pitched pantiled roofs, surrounding a central raised walkway at first-floor level. The exterior is clad in red Dorset bricks, with some decorative shaped brickwork; parts of the upper storey have tile hanging and trellises imitate the windows. The five-storey part-polygonal gatehouse is accessed by a ramp. Front Court contains the library, with a large projecting stepped triangular window divided into small square panes by a prominent black grid, and the chapel, dominated by a large stepped triangular stained-glass window by John Piper and Patrick Reyntiens, with a tall bronze-decorated door by Jacqueline Stieger. Three further courts provide student accommodation and offices.
Cambridge University Real Tennis Club	Cambridge University Real Tennis Club	II	1866	Grange Road; TL4403558424; 52.205226°N 0.106379°E	William Milner Fawcett, William Cecil Marshall (extension)		Built for Clare and Trinity colleges and later attached to the university, the original real tennis club has a rectangular court and L-shaped two-storey professional's house in yellow brick under slate roofs. A two-storey clubhouse and further rectangular court were added (1890) in yellow brick with red-brick decoration; the court has six gabled bays marked by pilasters, with red-brick diaperwork.
Silbury	Silbury	II	1906	Grange Road; TL4402558616; 52.206953°N 0.106315°E	Amian Lister Champneys	Edwardian Baroque/Neo-Georgian	Large rectangular house of two storeys plus attics, in brown-brick with red-brick dressings and a cornice, under a tiled roof with two chimneys. The symmetrical fourteen-bay front face has two prominent bowed dormers, finished with tile hanging; the central entrance has a semi-circular hood. There are two canted tile-hung dormers to the garden face, with similar ones on each end face.
Whewell House	Whewell House	II	1906	Grange Road; TL4402858650; 52.207258°N 0.106373°E	Amian Lister Champneys	Edwardian Baroque/Neo-Georgian	Large rectangular house of two storeys plus attics, in brown-brick with red-brick dressings and a cornice, under a tiled roof with two chimneys. The symmetrical fifteen-bay front face has two roof-level arches; these sections each have two oval ground-floor windows and a tall narrow first-floor window with a semi-circular top. They flank the central entrance, which has a semi-circular hood, with a dormer above. The garden face has paired two-storey projecting bows.
Saxmeadham	Saxmeadham	II	1911	Grange Road; TL4399458889; 52.209414°N 0.105977°E	Arnold Bidlake Mitchell	Neo-Georgian	Rectangular house in dark-red brick with paler red brick and stone dressings, with two storeys plus attics under a tiled roof with two chimneys. The symmetrical five-bay front face has a central entrance with an ashlar surround and canopy, with a band of rough stone outlined with red bricks above; this brick/rough stone decoration is repeated between all the ground- and first-floor windows on this face. The garden front has two canted bay windows.
Clare Hall	Main entrance, Clare Hall	II*	1969, 1987	Herschel Road; TL4391158280; 52.203964°N 0.104505°E	Ralph Erskine		The original college buildings, arranged around courtyards, fall into three areas: central facilities including the common room, reading room and dining room, four detached houses including the two-storey president's lodge, and a residential block; a similar block, also by Erskine, was added later. The site is elevated by a half-basement car park under the Herschel Road front. The red-brick buildings have red-stained timber detailing, under single-pitched timber roofs, most of which are covered with aluminium, while others have pantiles; there is also a translucent roof canopy. The president's lodge has a large bay window, with smaller ones to the other houses; some flats have cantilevered balconies. A prominent feature is the unusually wide rainwater-collection channels.
Murray Edwards College (New Hall)	Murray Edwards College	II*	1966	Huntingdon Road; TL4415559425; 52.214188°N 0.10856°E	Peter Chamberlin (Chamberlin, Powell and Bon)		Two adjoining courtyards, in concrete and white brick. One courtyard has the rectangular barrel-vaulted library and the hall, surrounded by four circular towers and capped with an eight-segmented dome. The other larger courtyard has three-storey residential blocks.
Kerbstones to pool, Murray Edwards College	Pool, Murray Edwards College	II*	1966	Huntingdon Road; TL4412459442; 52.214349°N 0.108114°E	Peter Chamberlin (Chamberlin, Powell and Bon)		The formal elevated circular concrete pool, with a fountain, is surrounded by moat with a semi-circular terminus; it is immediately adjacent to the college's hall, within the hall-and-library court.
The Grove	The Grove	II	1814	Huntingdon Road; TL4399159491; 52.214824°N 0.106189°E	William Custance	Neoclassical	House in grey brick with stone dressings and a cornice, of two storeys plus attics under a shallow slate roof. It was extended in the late 19th century. The oldest part has a two-storey bow. The north-west face has a central projecting bay, the north-east, a central entrance with Doric columns. Now forms part of Fitzwilliam College.
Westminster College Bounds	Westminster College Bounds	II	1899	Lady Margaret Road; TL4435259108; 52.211288°N 0.111306°E	probably H. T. Hare		Two-storey red-brick building with stone dressings under a tiled roof; it forms part of the theological college.
The End House	End House	II	1911	Lady Margaret Road; TL4417859180; 52.211981°N 0.108792°E	Baillie Scott		Dark-red-brick house of two storeys plus attics under a tiled roof with two tall chimneys. The entrance front has three unequal gabled projecting bays; the main entrance is asymmetrically placed between the middle small and rightmost gables, with the roof reaching to ground-floor level above. To the far right is a single-storey section.
Westminster and Cheshunt College	Westminster College	II	1899	Madingley Road–Queen's Road; TL4441059026; 52.210536°N 0.112119°E	H. T. Hare	Tudor Revival style	Main building of the theological college, in red brick with stone dressings. Although Tudor Revival, there are details in 17th-century style. The front face has two shallow projecting wings, an off-centre tower capped with a turret and lantern, and four oriel windows. The chapel dates from 1921.
Gates to Madingley Road, Westminster College	Gates and wall, Westminster College	II	c. 1899	Madingley Road–Queen's Road; TL4439458988; 52.210199°N 0.111869°E	possibly H. T. Hare		The main gates to the Madingley Road entrance to Westminster College, with associated railings and four stone piers; the other gates have brick-and-stone piers, and the red-brick wall has a stone coping. All the gate piers are finished with balls.
The north west range of Westminster College	North west range, Westminster College	II	1899	Madingley Road–Lady Margaret Road; TL4435759078; 52.211017°N 0.111366°E	H. T. Hare	Tudor Revival style	This building forms part of the theological college; other than a timber-framed section, it has similar architecture.
The Stone House, 3 Madingley Road	The Stone House	II	1896	Madingley Road; TL4414159031; 52.210652°N 0.108187°E	Edward Doran Webb	Queen Anne style	Two-storey rectangular house in Weldon limestone under a tiled roof, with a single-storey projecting wing. Features include mullion and transom windows, and an east-face entrance with an ogee arch topped by an ornately carved balcony with a carved coat of arms above.
Marshall House (Balliol Croft)	Marshall House (right)	II	1886	Madingley Road; TL4417659093; 52.2112°N 0.108726°E	J. J. Stevenson	Queen Anne style	Tall narrow red-brick house of two storeys plus attics under a tiled roof, with a three-storey flat-roofed tower at the east end. The south face has a central balcony under a pentice roof with wooden posts and balustrade. It now forms part of Lucy Cavendish College.
Elterholm, 12 and 12A Madingley Road	Elterholm	II	1887	Madingley Road; TL4408659212; 52.212292°N 0.10746°E	William Cecil Marshall, Prince and Sons, Harry Redfern	Tudor Revival style/Arts and Crafts	An L-shaped red-brick house of two storeys plus attics under a tiled roof with four chimneys. It features decorative timbering; the south face has three gables, two being jettied. A fruit store (1896), linked by an arched passage, and a detached laboratory (1911) were added; the laboratory has tile hanging.
31 Madingley Road	31 Madingley Road	II	1932	Madingley Road; TL4367659080; 52.211213°N 0.101408°E	Marshall Sisson	Early Modern Movement	Unrendered red-brick rectangular house with cast stone dressings; it has two or three storeys with a flat roof.
35 Madingley Road	35 Madingley Road	II	c. 1800	Madingley Road; TL4361259110; 52.211499°N 0.100484°E	Brock brothers (studio)	Arts and Crafts (studio)	Three-storey painted brick house under a slate roof. The four-bay front face has two two-storey canted bays with decorative cornices; between them is the main entrance, flanked by pilasters and topped with a pediment. At the rear, connected by a two-storey tower, is a two-storey artists' studio, built by the Brock brothers (1908); it features tile hanging, a clay-tiled mansard roof and a large roof-light.
The Observatory	The Observatory	II	1824	Madingley Road; TL4324759441; 52.214568°N 0.095286°E	John Clement Mead	Greek Revival	Two-storey building in brick faced with Bath stone ashlar, on a Devonshire granite plinth, with a slate and lead roof. The entrance (south) front has a central projecting portico with four Doric columns; the central copper-clad observatory dome is movable. The north front has two projecting wings, which housed the Observer and his assistant.
Northumberland Dome, The Observatory	Northumberland Dome, The Observatory	II	1838	Madingley Road; TL4318859402; 52.214233°N 0.094407°E			Small square white-brick single-storey building three bays wide, with the bays separated by pilasters, and a projecting entrance porch. The movable copper dome housing the telescope was renovated in 2013.
Schlumberger Gould Research Centre	Schlumberger Gould Research Centre	II*	1984	Madingley Road–High Cross; TL4233359154; 52.212226°N 0.081797°E	Michael Hopkins	High-Tech Movement	The initial phase of a research centre for the oil company, Schlumberger. The rectangular central building houses drilling test stations and the canteen; it has an external tubular steel frame supporting the translucent white single-skinned Teflon-coated fibreglass roof membrane, which forms three polygonal bays. On either side are long narrow single-storey ranges, housing laboratories, a library and offices; these have independent external steel frames, with a flat plastic membrane roof and outer glass walls.
Chapel of St Edmund's House	Chapel, St Edmund's House (left)	II	1916	Mount Pleasant; TL4416859290; 52.212971°N 0.108693°E	Benedict Williamson	Tudor Revival style	Plain red-brick Roman Catholic chapel of St Edmund's College, with stone dressings under a tiled roof. It abuts the west end of the college's south range.
Old Hall, Newnham College	Old Hall, Newnham College	II	1875	Newnham Walk; TL4420157778; 52.199363°N 0.108532°E	Basil Champneys	Queen Anne style	The first building constructed for Newnham College, Old Hall originally housed lecture rooms, dining rooms and student accommodation, the latter unusually arranged off corridors rather than on staircases. The four-storey building is in red brick with white-painted woodwork, with brick detailing including quoins, shaped gables, wooden roof-level balustrade, and high grouped chimneys connected by bridges. The fenestration includes Venetian windows, windows with arched tops and dormers. The symmetrical south front was intended as the main entrance; it was later extended with a north-west wing. (Note: Four storeys according to Bradley & Pevsner; the listing notes two storeys plus attics.)
Former laboratory, Newnham College	Old Labs, Newnham College	II	1878	Newnham Walk; TL4407657744; 52.199091°N 0.10669°E	Basil Champneys	Queen Anne style	This small detached single-storey building, located in the gardens south of Clough Hall, was originally a laboratory, as university laboratory facilities at that date excluded women. It is in red brick with two gables, in a style akin to Champney's other buildings for the college.
Sidgwick Hall, Newnham College	Sidgwick Hall, Newnham College (garden front)	II*	1880	Newnham Walk; TL4416857833; 52.199866°N 0.108073°E	Basil Champneys	Queen Anne style	L-shaped college building, of two storeys plus attics, in red brick with white woodwork, with high clustered chimneys. The garden front is symmetrical; its central section has a cornice. The fenestration includes Venetian windows, windows with arched tops and dormers. There is a wooden roof-level balustrade.
Clough Hall, Newnham College	Clough Hall, Newnham College	II*	1887	Newnham College site–Sidgwick Avenue; TL4407757862; 52.200151°N 0.106755°E	Basil Champneys	Queen Anne style	Large predominantly three-storey college building, in red brick with white woodwork, on a U-shaped plan with two terminal wings. The main east–west range has a central five-bay gabled section with a Venetian-style element in the centre to Sidgwick Avenue, flanked by recessed two-bay sections. The east wing adjoins the dining hall, built at the same time; it has shaped gables and windows with gauged-brick arches. The west wing of two storeys plus attics has oriel windows, dormers with curved pediments, and shaped gables finished with finials.
Dining hall, Newnham College	Dining hall, Newnham College (centre)	II	1887	Newnham Walk; TL4412057858; 52.200103°N 0.107382°E	Basil Champneys	Queen Anne style	College dining hall in red brick with white woodwork, adjoining Clough Hall and built at the same time. It has seven bays; the second in from each end projects to form two tall bow windows with domed caps. The other bays have large windows with curved heads and brick detailing including keystones above. Buttresses delineate the bays, supporting gauged-brick columns. The building's ends have shaped gables. The roof has a central wooden lantern. The interior has a gallery and a plasterwork ceiling in the style of the early 17th century.
Pfeiffer Archway, Newnham College	Pfeiffer Archway, Newnham College	II*	1893	Newnham Walk; TL4420357802; 52.199578°N 0.108572°E	Basil Champneys	Queen Anne style/Neo-Dutch Baroque style	The four-storey gatehouse dates from significantly later than the adjacent Old Hall, owing to problems over a right of way through the college. It is in red brick with white woodwork under a pantiled roof, with four non-identical part-octagonal turrets at the corners, finished with ogee-shaped caps; they each have three windows per storey. The archway has gauged-brick decoration including columns of three different orders. The ornate bronze/wrought-iron (Note: The listing states the gate screen is wrought iron; according to Bradley & Pevsner the gates are bronze.) gates and screen, part of Champneys' design, were made by Thomas Elsley. Above the archway there are three windows per storey, with arched tops. A Neo-Georgian building of 1946 by Buckland & Haywood replaces the original connecting buildings.
Old Library, Newnham College	Old Library, Newnham College (interior)	II*	1898	Newnham College site–Sidgwick Avenue; TL4414557869; 52.200196°N 0.107752°E	Basil Champneys	Queen Anne style	The original college library is a small single-storey red-brick building, with shaped gables and a rounded lead-roofed projection to the east end. The interior has a decorated plasterwork barrel-vault ceiling. It was extended by Champneys in 1907, giving a T-shaped plan, and several times since.
Kennedy Buildings, Newnham College	Kennedy Buildings, Newnham College	II*	1905	Newnham College site–Sidgwick Avenue; TL4401757873; 52.200265°N 0.105882°E	Basil Champneys	Queen Anne style	Fellows' accommodation at the north-west of the site, by Peile Hall. In red brick with brick quoins, it has two storeys plus attics under a mansard roof with high chimneys and dormer windows. The front to Sidgwick Avenue has a seven-bay arcade with stone dressings, a central entrance and three flanking fanlights, circular and square windows in brick panels above, surmounted by a balustrade.
Peile Hall, Newnham College	Peile Hall, Newnham College (garden front)	II*	1910	Newnham College site–Grange Road; TL4399357818; 52.199777°N 0.105508°E	Basil Champneys	Queen Anne style	The large red-brick college building has three storeys plus attics and white-painted woodwork. A long seven-bay central section runs north–south along the west (Grange Road) side of the site, and wings at each end outline a courtyard to the street. The north–south range has a central projecting pedimented section, three windows wide, to the garden front, with a mansard roof and dormer windows. The rear wings each have shaped gables and windows with gauged-brick arches.
Katharine Stephen Rare Books Library, Newnham College	Katharine Stephen Rare Books Library, Newnham College	II	1982	Newnham College site–Sidgwick Avenue; TL4418457880; 52.200284°N 0.108327°E	Joanna van Heyningen, Birkin Haward, Jr	Postmodern	A small detached two-storey library building, housing rare books; the design was inspired by Basil Champneys' original college library. The rectangular building has horizontal stripes of red and blue brick on a steel frame, under a lead-covered barrel-vaulted roof. There are two small steel windows to each of the end faces and a long narrow skylight on the crest of the roof.
Entrance to Trinity College Fellows' Garden	Trinity College Fellows' Garden entrance gates	II	Mid 18th century (gates), 20th century	Queen's Road; TL4433358613; 52.206846°N 0.110817°E			Pedestrian gate in wrought iron with an overthrow, originally from Rectory Manor House, Enfield, which also provided the gate for the University Library entrance on Burrell's Walk; the stone gate piers date from the 20th century.
Clare College screen and gates, Queen's Road	Clare College Memorial Court gate to Queen's Road	II	c. 1930	Queen's Road; TL4436458420; 52.205104°N 0.111189°E	Probably Giles Gilbert Scott		Screen with three paired gates, in wrought iron; the gate piers are of buff brick, topped with stone, and surmounted by carved finials.
Newnham Cottage	Newnham Cottage	II	c. 1805	Queen's Road; TL4442058094; 52.202145°N 0.111869°E	William Wilkins, Sr	Late Georgian	Two-storey villa in grey brick under a slate roof, with later extensions to the north side. The south (garden) front has a central inset section with three French windows, surmounted by a mid-19th-century rounded verandah of cast-iron and glass; the outer bays also each have a French window, and there are four windows to the first floor. The roof overhangs the inset section, with no interruption to the cornice.
Finella	Finella	II*	1830s	Queen's Road; TL4442258025; 52.201525°N 0.111869°E	Raymond McGrath (interior)	Late Georgian	Painted brick two-storey villa, now divided into flats, under a slate roof with broadly projecting eaves and three chimneys. The house is approximately square with a service wing to the north; the main entrance is on the east side. The garden (south) front has three canted bay windows with four windows above. The interior was decorated in 1928–29 by Raymond McGrath, using metal leaf, metal panels and glass, in an early example of the Modernist style.
Memorial Court, Clare College	East front, Clare Memorial Court Clare Memorial Court, interior of court	II*	1924, 1934	Queen's Road; TL4430158417; 52.205093°N 0.110266°E	Giles Gilbert Scott	Neo-Georgian	Grey-brick court with stone dressings, under pantiled roofs. The main court is rectangular with the corners truncated and the west side open; two slightly later projecting wings extend to the west, towards the University Library. The symmetrical three-storey entrance (east) face has a huge open central arch with inset screens and fluted columns, flanking a large stone entrance. This central bay is flanked by sections of nine windows on each side, with L-shaped two-storey continuations at each end, whose terminal bays are marked with fluted columns. The remainder of the building has two storeys.
Falling Warrior, Clare College Memorial Court	"Falling Warrior", Henry Moore	II	1957	Queen's Road (Clare Memorial Court); TL4428158401; 52.204955°N 0.109967°E	Henry Moore		The recumbent bronze sculpture depicts a dying male figure, at slightly smaller than life size (under 5 feet long), with a circular shield, atop a bronze plinth. It was placed here in 1961.
Gateway to the University Library from Clare College	Gates to the University Library, Clare College Memorial Court	II	c. 1930	Queen's Road (Clare Memorial Court) – University Library site TL4421358413; 52.205081°N 0.108977°E	Probably Giles Gilbert Scott		Wrought-iron gates, with gate piers in buff brick, whose stone tops are surmounted by vases.
Entrance range of Ridley Hall	Ridley Hall entrance range	II	1882	Ridley Hall Road; TL4439557846; 52.199923°N 0.111398°E	Charles L. Luck	Tudor Revival style	The three-storey entrance (east) range of the theological college, in red brick with Ancaster stone dressings and mullion and transom windows, under a tiled roof. The central gatehouse has crenellations. On each side is a four-window section terminating in a gabled bay: a single large gable with an oriel window at the north end, and two slightly projecting gabled bays, originally forming the principal's lodge, at the south.
Ridley Hall gateway	Ridley Hall gateway	II	1882	Ridley Hall Road; TL4441157846; 52.199919°N 0.111632°E	Charles L. Luck	Tudor Revival style	A pair of cast-iron gates between gate piers in red brick with Ancaster stone dressings. The piers are surmounted by large stone tops with an ogee profile.
Ridley Hall Chapel	Ridley Hall Chapel	II	1892	Ridley Hall Road; TL4436357880; 52.200237°N 0.110944°E	William Wallace	Tudor Revival style	The chapel of the theological college, in red brick with Ancaster stone dressings, with crenellations and a tiled roof. There are five bays, one of which was added in 1914, with buttresses. The windows feature stone tracery. The interior has stained glass by R. J. Newbery, later altered by Joan Howson, and a reredos by Albert Richardson.
North range of Ridley Hall	Ridley Hall north range (rear)	II	1892	Ridley Hall Road; TL4433657875; 52.2002°N 0.110548°E	William Wallace	Tudor Revival style	Three-storey accommodation block for the theological college, similar to Wallace's later west range; it has been altered. The building is in red brick with Ancaster stone dressings and mullion and transom windows, under a tiled roof with high chimneys and crenellations. The front facing the court has six bays, some of which are gabled; the two central bays are flanked by two with slight projections. (Note: At the time of the listing, two of the non-projecting bays had gables, but the Images of England photograph of 2003 shows four gables.)
West range of Ridley Hall	Ridley Hall west range (rear)	II	1912	Ridley Hall Road; TL4431057844; 52.199928°N 0.110154°E	William Wallace	Tudor Revival style	Three-storey accommodation block for the theological college, similar to Wallace's earlier north range. The building is in red brick with Ancaster stone dressings and mullion and transom windows, under a tiled roof with high chimneys. The front facing the court has five bays, with the two outermost being gabled, and the middle three having crenellations; all three middle bays project, with the centre one projecting the furthest.
Raised Faculty Building, Sidgwick Site	Raised Faculty Building, Sidgwick Site	II	1961	Sidgwick Site, Sidgwick Avenue; TL4426657986; 52.201215°N 0.109571°E	Casson, Conder and Partners		The C-shaped two-storey university faculty building, part of the original design for the Sidgwick Site, forms three sides of a rectangular court completed on the west by the Faculty of Economics, with libraries in the long arms. Except for the entrance, the entire concrete-framed flat-roofed building is elevated above ground level by paired concrete pillars, forming a cloister. Faced in white Portland stone, it has irregularly placed and sized windows, some of which span storeys, with a narrow window band beneath the cornice in some parts. The concrete base is shaped with round-cornered holes and a wavy edge.
Faculty of Economics, Sidgwick Site	Faculty of Economics, Sidgwick Site	II	1961	Sidgwick Site, Sidgwick Avenue; TL4419057971; 52.2011°N 0.108454°E	Casson, Conder and Partners		The five-storey university faculty building, part of the original design for the Sidgwick Site, forms the west side of a court completed by the Raised Faculty Building and also projects southwards. The long narrow rectangular block has a concrete frame, faced in brick, with irregularly placed windows including steel-framed bay windows. There are open sections in the ground floor forming passageways, and the upper floor is recessed.
Lady Mitchell Hall, Sidgwick Site	Lady Mitchell Hall, Sidgwick Site	II	1964	Sidgwick Site, Sidgwick Avenue; TL4422957930; 52.200722°N 0.109006°E	Casson, Conder and Partners		The larger of two university lecture theatres, which form part of the original design for the Sidgwick Site. The brick building has an irregular octagonal plan under a complex aluminium-covered roof, with two large visible box beams. A rectangular glass entrance foyer projects at the north end, and there are large windows to the sides.
Little Lecture Hall and Lecture Hall Block, Sidgwick Site	Little Lecture Hall (right), Sidgwick Site	II	1960, 1964	Sidgwick Site, Sidgwick Avenue; TL4428357948; 52.200869°N 0.109804°E	Casson, Conder and Partners		The smaller of two university lecture theatres and associated block of lecture rooms, which form part of the original design for the Sidgwick Site. The polygonal brick Little Hall has a truncated pyramidal metal roof with a skylight. The tall rectangular Lecture Hall Block is of concrete faced in brick and has irregularly placed windows.
History Faculty, Sidgwick Site	History Faculty, Sidgwick Site	II*	1968	Sidgwick Site, Sidgwick Avenue; TL4419658046; 52.201772°N 0.108573°E	James Stirling		The L-shaped university faculty building has a glass roof over the reading room of the Seeley Historical Library, filling the space between the arms. The six-storey building over a basement has a concrete frame; it has a stepped profile, wider at the base than the top. The long faces of the L are occupied with windows and the ends are clad in red brick. The glass library roof, supported by a steel framework, forms a section of a pyramid, rising in steps. On the north side are the main entrances on two levels, and two adjacent towers for lift and stairs (originally clad in red tiles, since replaced by brick), with glass bridges joining to the main L shape.
29 Storey's Way	29 Storey's Way	II	1922	Storey's Way; TL4361359571; 52.215641°N 0.100694°E	Baillie Scott	Neo-Georgian	Square brick house, partly white painted, with a small service wing. It has two storeys, with a mansard roof and tall chimneys on each corner. The entrance has pilasters and a curved canopy, surrounded by oval windows.
30 Storey's Way (Gryt-Howe)	30 Storey's Way	II	1914	Storey's Way; TL4355059609; 52.215999°N 0.099789°E	Baillie Scott	Arts and Crafts	Small rectangular white-rendered brick house with a tiled roof and one large and one small chimney; it has a single storey with attics. The main garden front has an off-central tile-hung gable.
48 Storey's Way	48 Storey's Way	II*	1913	Storey's Way; TL4357259503; 52.215041°N 0.100066°E	Baillie Scott	Arts and Crafts	Rendered brick rectangular house of two storeys plus attic under a steeply pitched tiled roof, with two tall chimneys. On the front face, the roof reaches the ground-floor storey on one side, and there are two unequal gabled bays on the other.
54 Storey's Way (Lennel)	54 Storey's Way	II	1922	Storey's Way; TL4364359497; 52.214968°N 0.101102°E	Baillie Scott	Neo-Georgian	Rectangular two-storey brick house with a pantiled roof, a cornice and two chimneys. On the front face, the central part projects and the entrance is surmounted by a swan-neck pediment.
56 Storey's Way (Squerryes)	56 Storey's Way	II	1923	Storey's Way; TL4366259488; 52.214882°N 0.101376°E	Baillie Scott	Picturesque style	Brick house with two projecting wings and a central two-storey porch, under a tiled roof. There are dormers at both the first floor and the attic levels.
63 Storey's Way	63 Storey's Way	II	1912	Storey's Way; TL4392159333; 52.213422°N 0.105098°E	T. D. Atkinson	Neo-Georgian	Large yellow-brick house with two storeys plus attic, under a pantiled roof with a cornice and two chimneys. On the front face, the central bay projects slightly and the entrance is surmounted by a large curved pediment, with a canted window above.
76 Storey's Way	76 Storey's Way	II	1913	Storey's Way; TL4388059344; 52.213532°N 0.104503°E	Arthur Hamilton Moberly	Neo-Georgian	Large yellow-brick rectangular house with two storeys plus attic under a deep tiled roof with dormer windows and two chimneys. The front face has eight bays; the central four are slightly recessed and highlighted by silver-brick pilasters, and there are also silver-brick quoins.
Central buildings, Churchill College	Dining hall (centre) with library (left), Churchill College	II	1968	Storey's Way; TL4378659274; 52.212927°N 0.103099°E	Richard Sheppard (Sheppard, Robson & Partners)	Brutalist	The main communal and administrative buildings of the college, in brown brick and concrete on an H-shaped plan. Two massive brick edifices frame the college's main entrance, with an aluminium gate by Geoffrey Clarke. The first-floor dining hall (the bar of the "H") has vertically slatted concrete windows and a tripled barrel-vaulted concrete roof, with the buttery, bar and common rooms on the ground floor. The boiler house has paired tall concrete chimneys.
Wolfson Hall, Bracken Library and Bevin Rooms, Churchill College	Library (left) and dining hall (right), Churchill College	II	1968	Storey's Way; TL4374259225; 52.212499°N 0.102434°E	Richard Sheppard (Sheppard, Robson & Partners)	Brutalist	Two-storey college library and hall in brown brick and concrete. The east face has a semicircular staircase and a long window with closely arranged vertical concrete slats. The library was extended (1973) in similar style to provide an archive to house Winston Churchill's papers. The main entrance is in bronze by Geoffrey Clarke.
East court, Churchill College	East court, Churchill College	II	1968	Storey's Way; TL4380959189; 52.212158°N 0.103399°E	Richard Sheppard (Sheppard, Robson & Partners)	Brutalist	Three linked courts of two/three-storey student accommodation under a flat copper-clad roof, south of the college's central buildings. The brown brick is interrupted with horizontal concrete bands marking storeys and at the top. The wide bay windows are spaced unevenly so that each student room has one.
South and west courts, Churchill College	South and west courts, Churchill College	II	1968	Storey's Way; TL4369759177; 52.212079°N 0.101756°E	Richard Sheppard (Sheppard, Robson & Partners)	Brutalist	Four linked courts of two/three-storey student accommodation under a flat copper-clad roof, south-west of the college's central buildings. The brown brick is interrupted with horizontal concrete bands marking storeys and at the top. The wide bay windows are spaced unevenly so that each student room has one.
North court, Churchill College	North court, Churchill College	II	1968	Storey's Way; TL4371259334; 52.213486°N 0.102042°E	Richard Sheppard (Sheppard, Robson & Partners)	Brutalist	Three linked courts of two/three-storey student accommodation under a flat copper-clad roof, west of the college's central buildings. The brown brick is interrupted with horizontal concrete bands marking storeys and at the top. The wide bay windows are spaced unevenly so that each student room has one.
Sheppard Flats (Research Flats), Churchill College	Sheppard Flats, Churchill College	II	1961	Storey's Way; TL4342659444; 52.214549°N 0.097905°E	Richard Sheppard (Sheppard, Robson & Partners)	Brutalist	Two-storey brown-brick accommodation with flat roofs for married researchers; the repeating units interlock to form a swastika. The ground-floor flats have individual exterior areas whose partition walls are continuous with the accommodation walls. Access to the first-floor flats is via external staircases. The flats were the earliest part of Churchill College to be completed.
Chapel, Churchill College	Chapel, Churchill College (interior)	II	1967	Storey's Way; TL4336459402; 52.214187°N 0.096981°E	Richard Sheppard (Sheppard, Robson & Partners)	Brutalist	Square chapel under a flat copper roof with four copper skylights, with sloping heads. The plain brown-brick walls each have two narrow vertical windows with stained glass by John Piper and Patrick Reyntiens. Eight concrete beams are slotted above the windows, intersecting to trace a cross.
Entrance gateway to the University Library onto Burrell's Walk	Overthrow to University Library gateway, Burrell's Walk	II	After 1722 (gates), 1935	University Library site–Burrell's Walk; TL4419458481; 52.205696°N 0.108729°E	Probably Giles Gilbert Scott (gateway)		Wrought-iron gate forming the pedestrian gateway to the University Library on the north side. Originally from Rectory Manor House, Enfield, the overthrow bears the arms of J. G. Nightingale (another gate from there is at Trinity Fellows' Garden). The gate is set in low buff-brick walls with a stone coping, surmounted by wrought-iron railings. At the ends of the wall are paired brick piers, finished with balls.
University Library	University Library	II	1934	University Library site TL4416158411; 52.205076°N 0.108216°E	Giles Gilbert Scott		Elongated symmetrical building in mid-brown brick with stone dressings including a cornice, under a pantiled roof. There is a prominent central tower of twelve storeys with a pyramidal roof, under which is a projecting bay with a huge arched entrance with a rusticated surround and four small windows above, surmounted by a pediment; the entrance has a bronze screen and doorway by H. H. Martin. This central bay is flanked by slightly recessed sections, and outer wings with twelve tall vertical windows, which are repeated on the tower, with the outermost windows being arched, with stone balustrades. Paired two-storey wings project to the rear.
Harvey Court, Gonville and Caius College	Harvey Court, Gonville and Caius	II*	1962	West Road; TL4432658137; 52.202556°N 0.110513°E	Leslie Martin, Colin St John Wilson, Patrick Hodgkinson		Three-storey buff-brick terraces providing student accommodation in stepped tiers under flat bronze-covered roofs; each tier's roof provides a terrace for the higher level. The top storey is supported on piers. The terraces form a courtyard enclosing an elevated square platform, with three sides facing inwards and the south one outwards; this (south) face is broken by a broad staircase leading to the garden. The south end of the east face has the entrance, under a concrete canopy. Beneath the central platform is a breakfast room, illuminated by a large square skylight in the courtyard.
9 Wilberforce Road	9 Wilberforce Road	II	1937	Wilberforce Road; TL4358858783; 52.208568°N 0.099995°E	Dora Cosens	Modern Movement	Two-storey almost-square house in rendered or whitewashed brick, under a flat roof with a roof terrace and prominent canopy. The garden front has a symmetrically placed first-floor balcony.
Emmanuel College Sports Pavilion	Emmanuel College Sports Pavilion	II	1910	Wilberforce Road; TL4352258697; 52.207812°N 0.098993°E	Reginald Francis Wheatly, Edward Ford Duncanson	Picturesque style with Neo-classical features	Emmanuel College's sports pavilion and associated groundsman's house and former stables, in rendered brick, with an asymmetrical plan under steeply pitched tiled roofs. The pavilion is topped with a copper cupola whose base is decorated with chevrons; it has a loggia with Tuscan columns to the front and two main wings, the east of which also has a loggia. To the rear, the two-storey L-shaped groundsman's house is linked by a single-storey section, with a tall chimney.

== Notes and references ==
Sources

- Simon Bradley, Nikolaus Pevsner. Cambridgeshire (The Buildings of England series) (Yale University Press; 2014) ISBN 978-0-300-20596-1
- Charles McKean. Architectural Guide to Cambridge and East Anglia Since 1920 (Era Publications Board/RIBA Publications; 1982) ISBN 0-907598-013
- Alan Powers. Modern: The Modern Movement in Britain (Merrell; 2005) ISBN 9781858942551
- Tim Rawle. Cambridge Architecture (2nd edn) (André Deutsch; 1993) ISBN 0-233-98818-1
