= LMH =

LMH may refer to:

== Locations ==
- Lady Margaret Hall, Oxford, England
- Lady Mitchell Hall, Cambridge, England
- Lyell McEwin Hospital, Adelaide, Australia

== Other uses ==
- Le Mans Hypercar, FIA class of racing cars
- Liter/m^{2}/hour, a measure of liquid flow
