= Leckhampton, Corpus Christi College, Cambridge =

Coordinates: 52.20150°N 0.10130°E

The George Thomson Building and Leckhampton House

Since 1961 Leckhampton has been the residential site for postgraduate students of Corpus Christi College of the University of Cambridge, England. It consists of the late-19th-century Leckhampton House, the George Thomson Building, dating from 1964, and several other nearby houses. In 2012, a new, purpose-built accommodation building was built to house additional students. The new building was opened on 14 September 2012 by the College Visitor and Chancellor of the University, David Sainsbury.

The buildings are set off Grange Road in the west of Cambridge amidst large, attractive gardens adjacent to Corpus's sports grounds, about fifteen minutes' walk from the main college site in Trumpington Street. Leckhampton has its own library, dining hall and bar; it forms the social as well as residential centre of Corpus graduate life. It also houses a number of fellows, both visiting and of Corpus.

Removed from the city centre, yet close to many academic buildings including the University Library and the Sidgwick Site, Leckhampton is in a convenient location for graduate students, and was a pioneering development among Cambridge colleges when it was established as a graduate centre. Prior to this, graduate students at Cambridge, long a tiny minority of the student body, had for the most part lived among undergraduates in colleges' main sites. Corpus's response to the rapidly growing number of graduate students in the 1960s was to establish in 1961 at Leckhampton a largely self-contained graduate community, a move which has since been emulated to some extent by many other colleges. Although at least one of these developments went much further than Leckhampton – Clare College's graduate site became the independent college of Clare Hall in 1984. Since the separation of Clare and Clare Hall, it is once again unique among the colleges that admit both undergraduates and postgraduates in having a dedicated graduate site.

The interests of Leckhampton are represented by the Warden of Leckhampton, a senior Fellow of the College. The Warden has rooms in Leckhampton House, and hosts a number of social functions at Leckhampton throughout the year. The current Warden is John David Rhodes, who lectures on European and American cinema in the Faculty of Modern and Medieval Languages.

== History ==
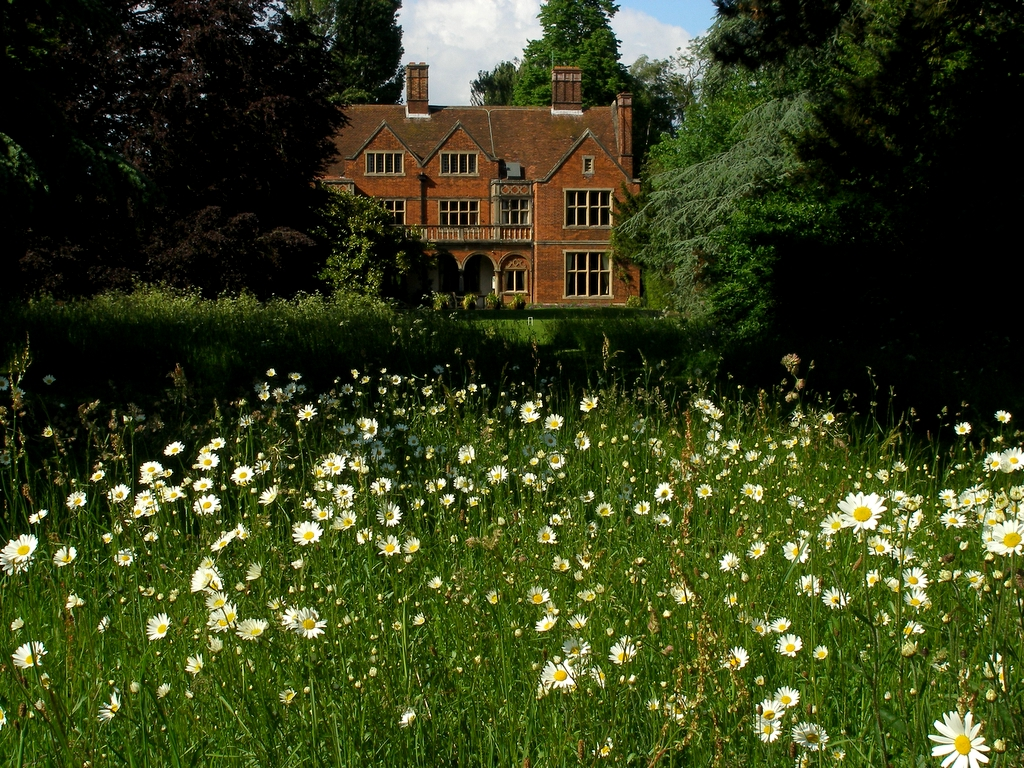
Leckhampton House and garden

Leckhampton House was designed by the architect William C. Marshall in 1881 for its first inhabitants, Frederic W. H. Myers and Eveleen Tennant. Frederic Myers was a classical scholar, poet, essayist and founder of the Society for Psychical Research. Eveleen Tennant Myers was a talented amateur photographer whose collection is displayed at the National Portrait Gallery, including many photographs of Leckhampton House.

In contrast to Leckhampton House's suburban late-Victorianism, the George Thomson Building (named after the Nobel Prize-winning physicist George Paget Thomson, sometime master of the college) is Grade II listed example of postwar modernism, designed by Philip Dowson of Arup Associates. Like other buildings of its kind on University campuses, some have criticised it as unimaginative, boxy and out of place. Others, however, have hailed it as an outstanding example for the period. The other buildings of Leckhampton are late-19th-century houses in the adjacent streets which have been bought by the college over the years and linked to the main buildings and gardens, and a new building opened in September 2012.

== List of wardens ==
- H. C. Longuet-Higgins (1962-1966)
- Robin Coombs (1966-1969)
- J. P. T. Bury (1969-1975)
- Barry Cross (1975-1980)
- John T. Dingle (1980-1986)
- D. W. Dewhurst (1986-1993)
- Haroon Ahmed (1993-1998)
- A. V. Lowe (1998-1999)
- C. J. Howe (1999-2004)
- David Ibbetson (2004–2013)
- J. Buxton (2013–2017)
- J. D. Rhodes (2017-Pres.)

== See also ==
- Listed buildings in Cambridge (west)
