= Queen's Road, Cambridge =

Road in Cambridge

Coordinates: 52.204°N 0.112°E

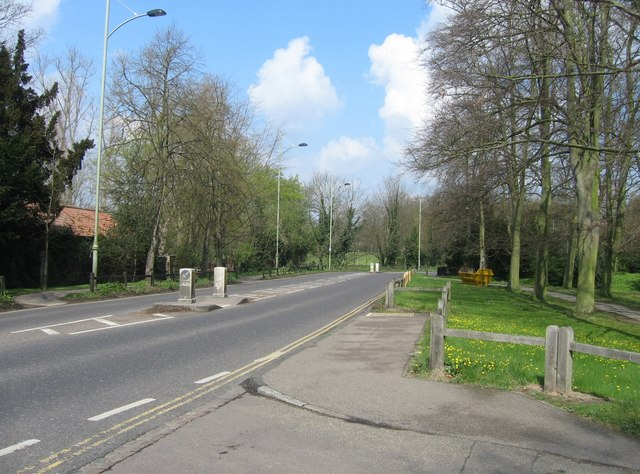
View along Queen's Road

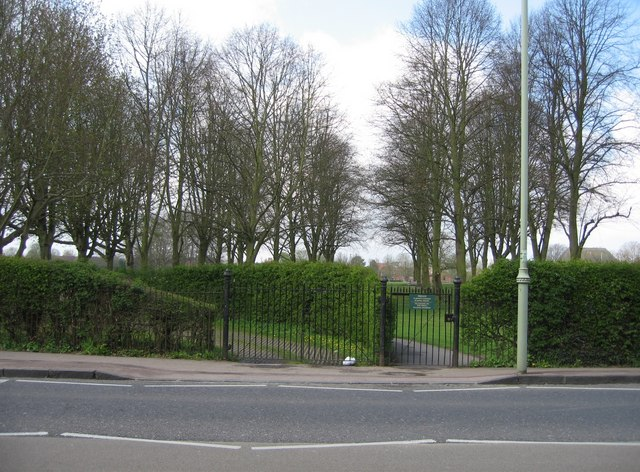
Gate onto St John's College playing fields from Queen's Road

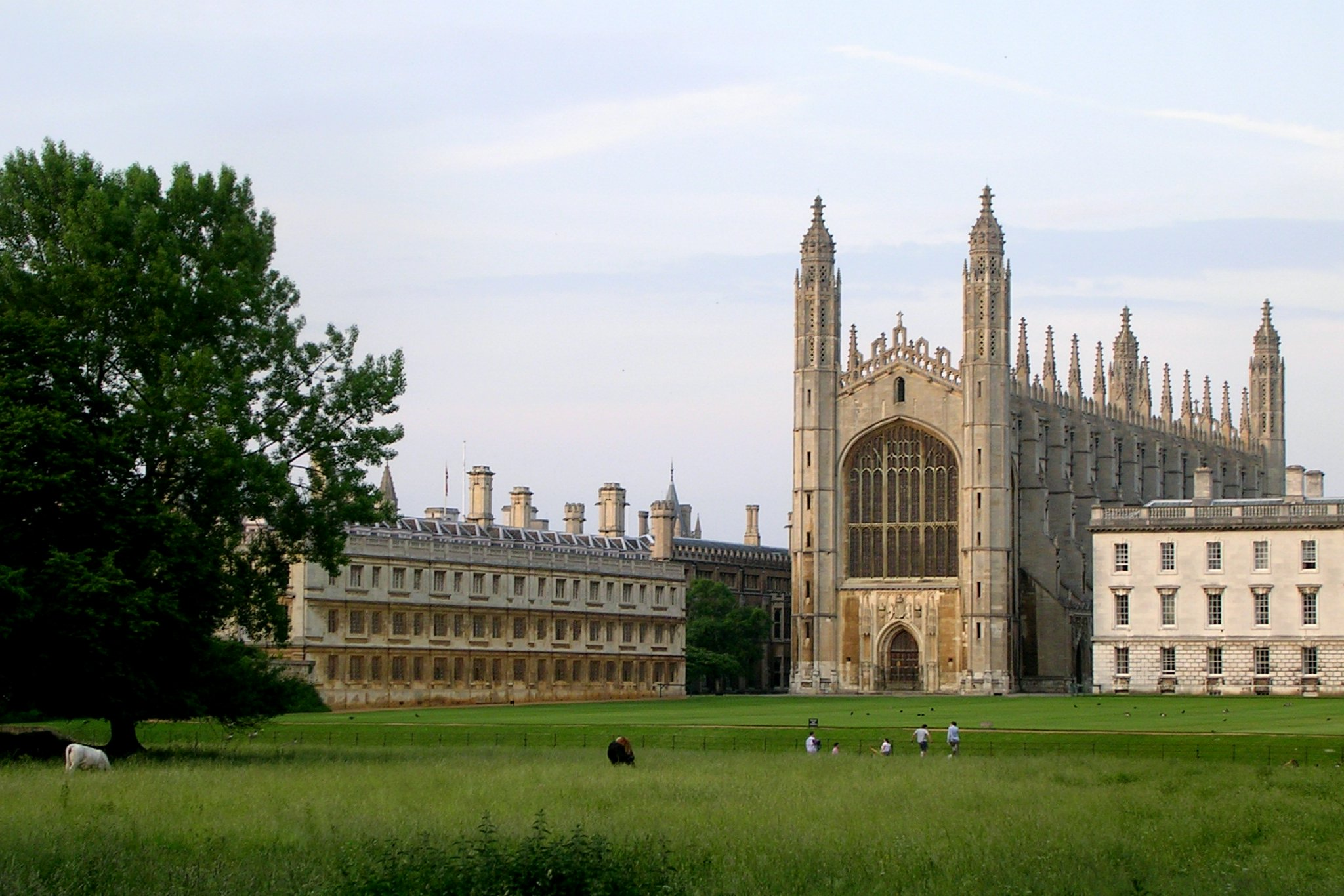
View of King's College from The Backs

Queen's Road (designated the A1134) is a major road to the west of central Cambridge, England. It links with Madingley Road and Northampton Street to the north and with Sidgwick Avenue, Newnham Road and Silver Street to the south.

At the northern end to the west is St John's College Sports Ground. At the opposite side of the junction to the east at the southern end is Darwin College. Queens' College also backs onto the road on the east side at the southern end.

To the east are The Backs along the River Cam, providing one of the best views in Cambridge of the backs of some of the biggest and oldest Cambridge University colleges, including St John's, Trinity College, Trinity Hall, Clare College, King's College, and Queens' College. Opposite King's College, West Road leads off to the west.

In 1871, Henry Sidgwick, a Fellow of Trinity, alongside Anne Clough (the first Principal of Newnham College) and Eleanor Balfour (Sidgwick's future wife) oversaw the purchase of 74 Regent Street to house five female students who wished to attend lectures but did not live near enough to the University to do so. The following year (1872), this moved to Merton House (built c1800) on Queen's Road, and in 1875 the first building for Newnham College was built at the current site on Sidgwick Avenue adjoining Queen's Road.

== Name ==
It is not clear whether the road was named after Queens' College or to celebrate visits made by Queen Victoria in 1842 and 1847. The city council's placing of the apostrophe implies – at least according to more recent century conventions in respect of apostrophe usage – a preference on the part of the authorities for the second of these explanations.

== See also ==
- Listed buildings in Cambridge (west), with seven buildings in Queen's Road
