= Silver Street, Cambridge =

Street in Cambridge, England

Silver Street
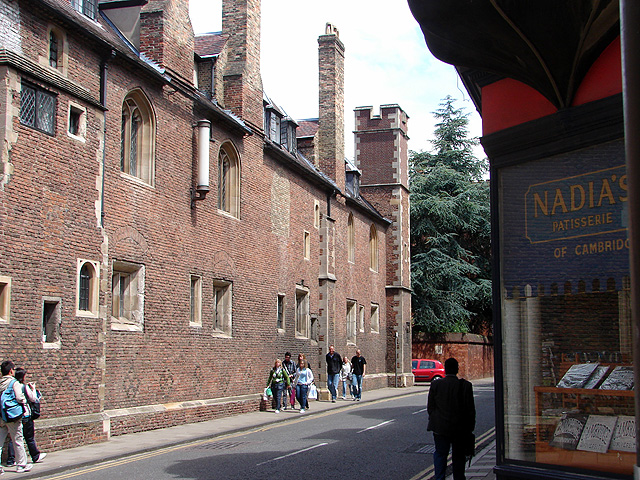
- At the eastern end of Silver Street, looking east. Part of Queens' College is on the left

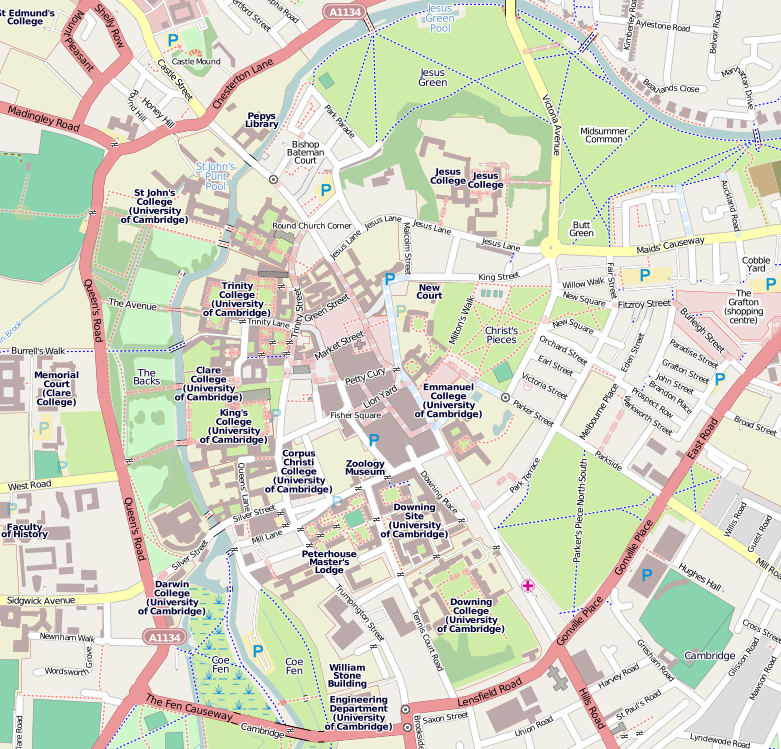
- Location within Central Cambridge
- Location: Cambridge, United Kingdom
- Coordinates: 52.202°N 0.1157°E
- West end: Queens Road
- East end: Trumpington Street

Silver Street is located in the southwest of central Cambridge, England. It links Queen's Road to the west with Trumpington Street to the east. The road continues west out of central Cambridge as Sidgwick Avenue.

The road crosses the River Cam on Silver Street Bridge. The current bridge was built in 1958–1959 to a 1932 design by Sir Edwin Lutyens, and replaced an 1841 cast iron bridge.

At the southwestern end to the south is Darwin College. Queens' College is halfway along on the north side, on both sides of the River Cam. At the eastern end to the north fronting onto Trumpington Street is St Catharine's College.

To the north are The Backs along the river, providing one of the best views in Cambridge of the backs of some of the most historic and prestigious Cambridge University colleges.

To the south, on the east side of the Cam, is the Silver Street/Mill Lane Site, one of the University of Cambridge sites. This is bounded by Silver Street to the north, Trumpington Street to the east, Little St Mary' Lane to the south, and Granta Place / Laundress Lane on the Cam to the west. Mill Lane runs east–west through the middle of the site. Various University departments, other University facilities, and the University Centre, are located here.

== Notable former residents ==
Gwen Raverat (1885–1957, née Darwin, granddaughter of the naturalist Charles Darwin) was a wood engraver, artist, and illustrator, who co-founded the Society of Wood Engravers. She was the daughter of Sir George Darwin FRS, astronomer and mathematician, and his wife Maud du Puy. During her childhood, she lived in Newnham Grange on Silver Street in a house that now forms part of Darwin College. She was born and died in the house. Gwen Raverat married the French painter Jacques Raverat and moved to southern France. On her husband's death in 1925, she settled back in Cambridge. In 1946 she moved to The Old Granary on Silver Street, also now part of Darwin College, where she published her childhood memoir Period Piece in 1952.

== Panoramic view ==
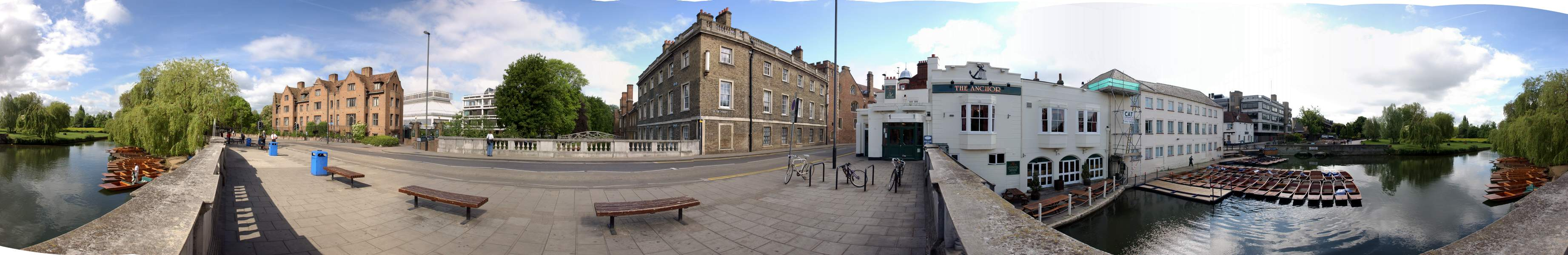
Panoramic view, taken from Silver Street Bridge, 2007. Parts of Queens College may be seen on both sides of the river

== See also ==
- List of bridges in Cambridge
