= West Road, Cambridge =

Street in Cambridge, England

Coordinates: 52.2028°N 0.1087°E

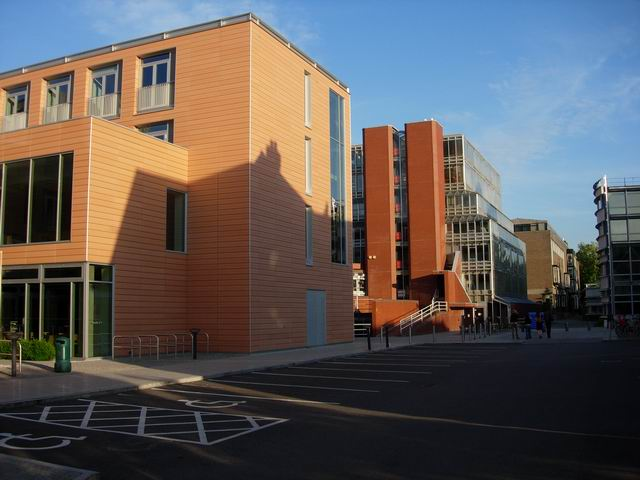
Partial view of 9 West Road, containing the Faculty of English (left).

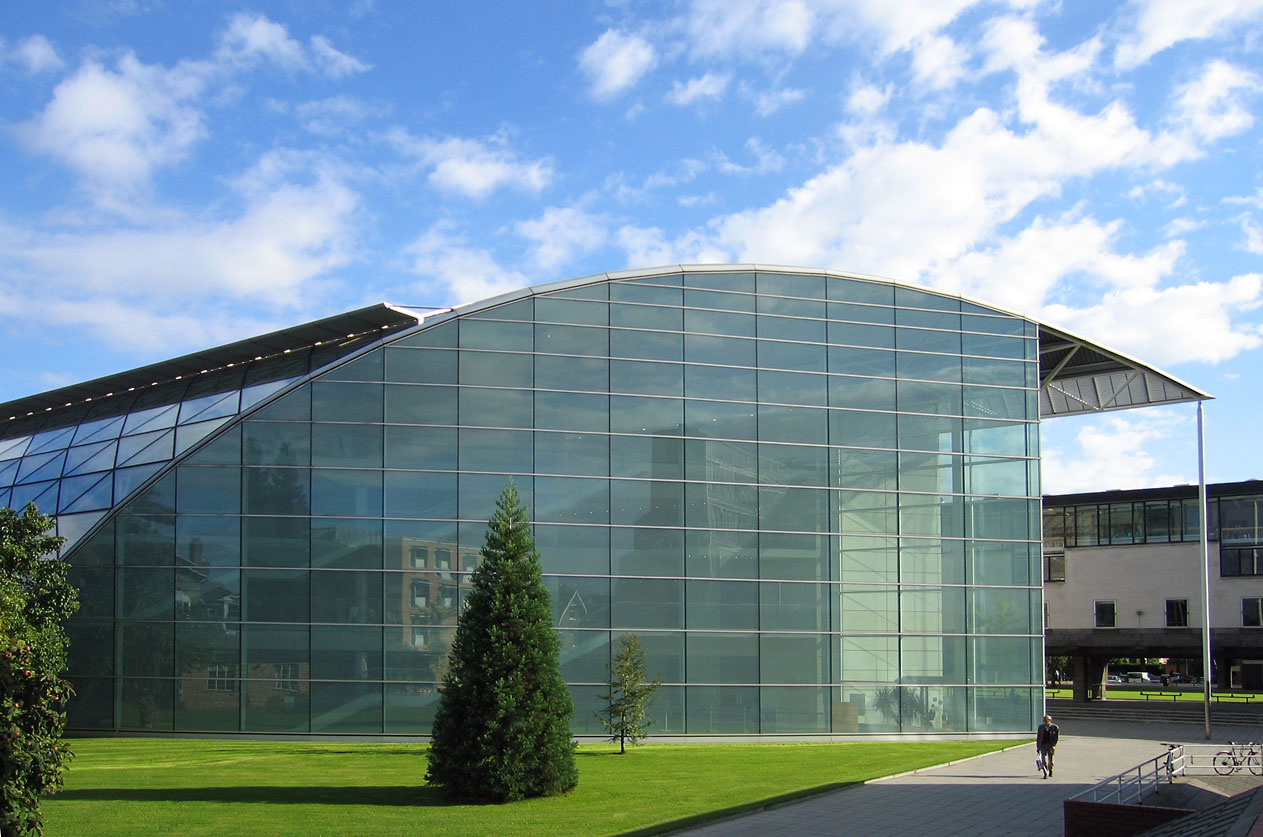
The Faculty of Law, University of Cambridge, 10 West Road, on the Sidgwick Site to the south.

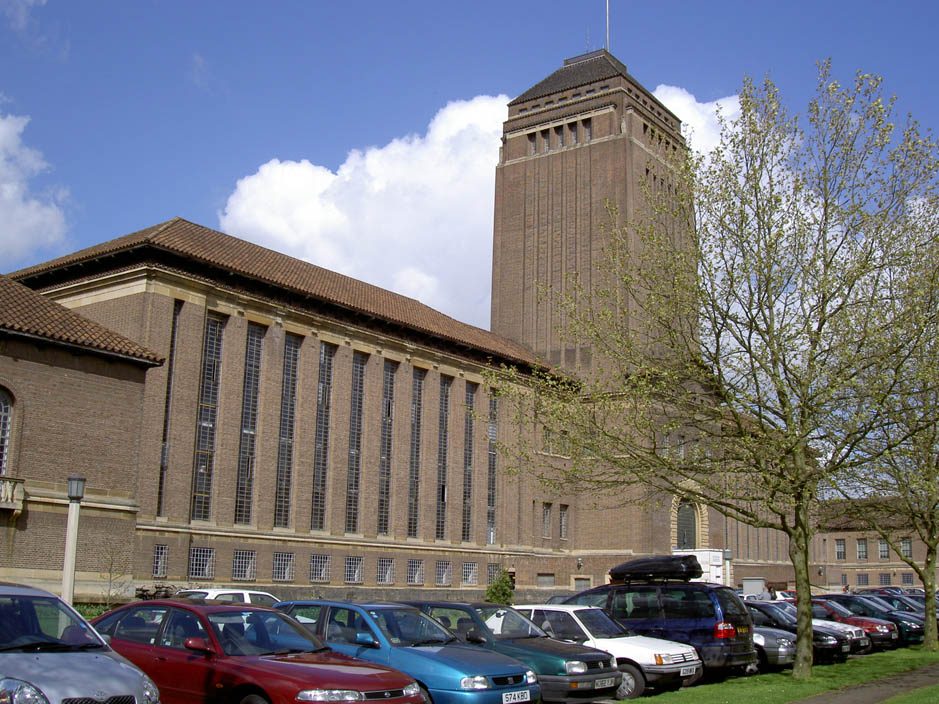
The Cambridge University Library, located to the north of West Road.

West Road is located in western Cambridge, England. It links Grange Road to the west with Queen's Road to the east. The road is north of Sidgwick Avenue and the Sidgwick Site, a major site of the University of Cambridge, currently under redevelopment. Facilities on West Road include the Cambridge University Faculty of Law, the Faculty of Music, the Faculty of English and the Department of Anglo-Saxon, Norse and Celtic, and the West Road Concert Hall.

To the north of West Road are King's College School, associated with King's College, and the Cambridge University Library. There are also tennis courts here.

There are a number of University of Cambridge colleges and buildings located off West Road:

- Harvey Court, Gonville and Caius College
- Garden Hostel, King's College
- St Chad's Court, St Catharine's College
- Ann's Court, Selwyn College
