= Lady Mitchell Hall =

Lecture hall at the University of Cambridge

Coordinates: 52.20077°N 0.10899°E

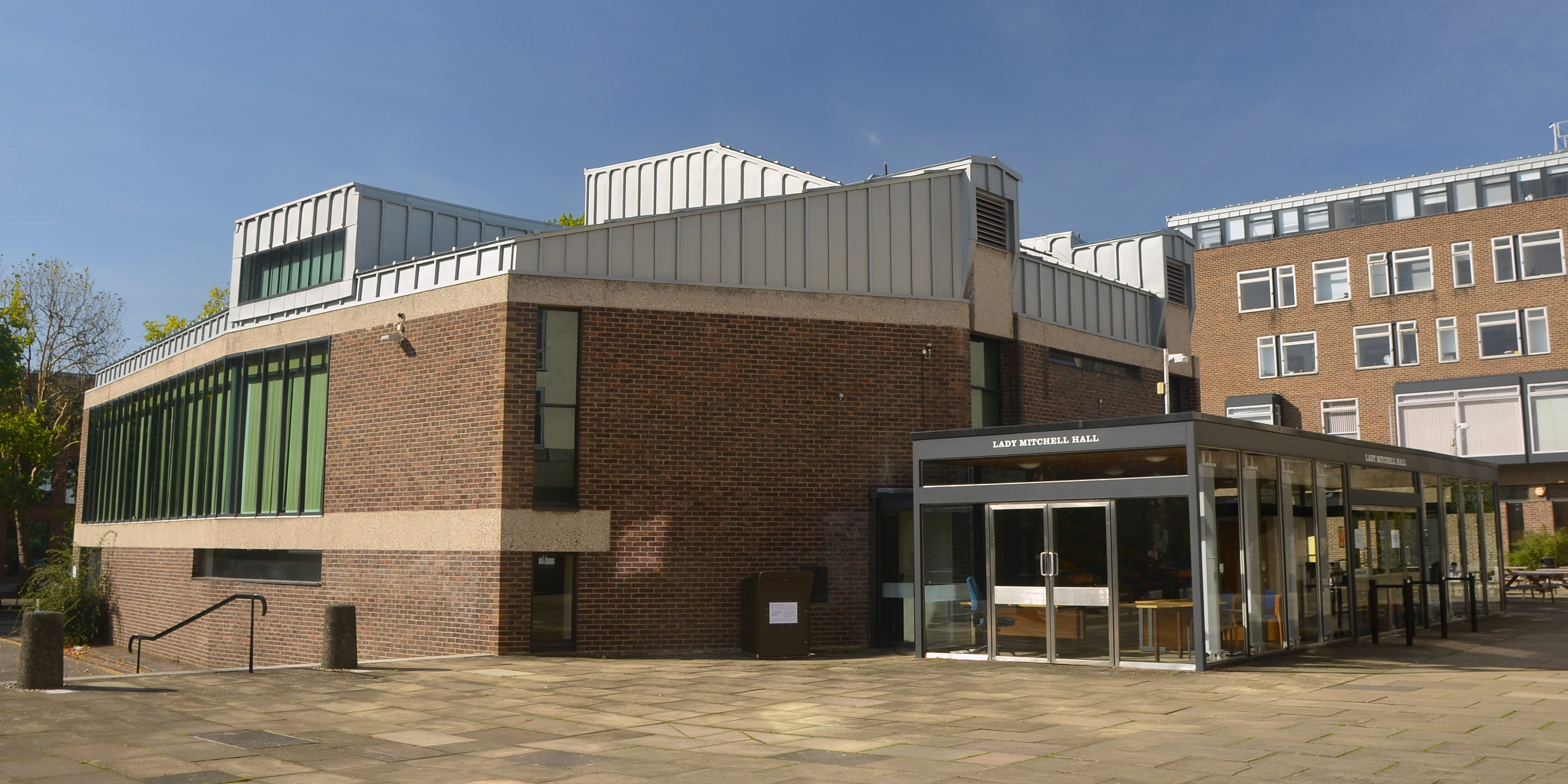
Lady Mitchell Hall at the University of Cambridge

Lady Mitchell Hall (LMH) is a large lecture theatre owned by the University of Cambridge. It is located on the University's Sidgwick Site, north of Sidgwick Avenue in Cambridge, England.

The lecture theatre is used for important general interest lectures, for example the annual Darwin College Lecture Series. The hall accommodates 500 people.

The building is polygonal in shape, built of brick with a metal roof. It was built between 1956 and 1968 by Casson, Conder and Partners. It is a Grade II listed building.

On 2 March 1969, Yoko Ono and John Lennon's first public concert together was held at Lady Mitchell Hall. To mark the 50th anniversary of the event, art historian and curator Gabriella Daris produced and gifted to the University of Cambridge a plaque which reads "Yoko Ono John Lennon Cambridge 1969". This was unveiled in the foyer of the Lady Mitchell Hall on 2 March 2019.

== See also ==
- Listed buildings in Cambridge (west)
