= Sidgwick Site =

Site within the University of Cambridge, England

Coordinates: 52.20165°N 0.10900°E

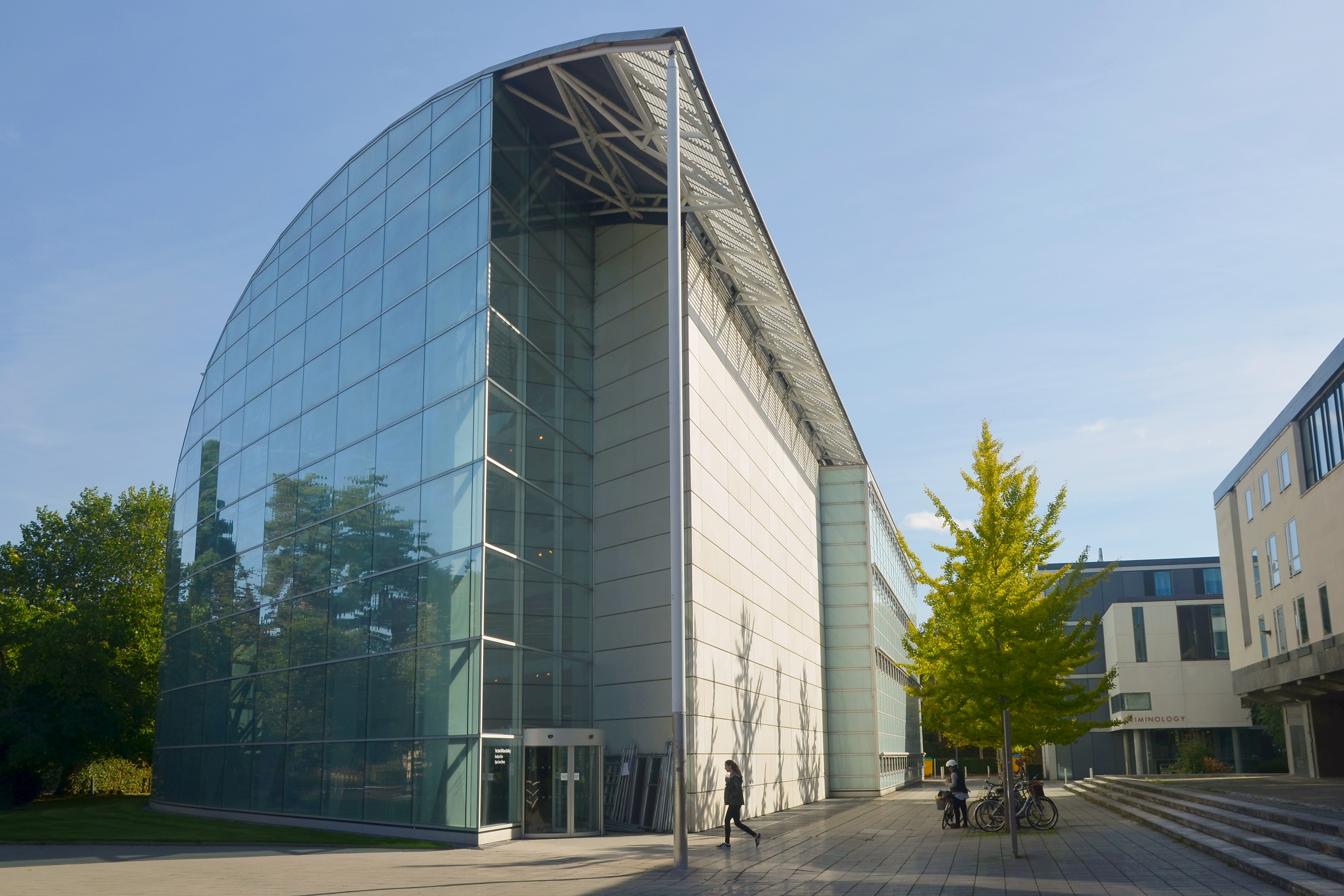
The Faculty of Law building (left), Cambridge Institute of Criminology (in the distance) and Raised Faculty Building (right)

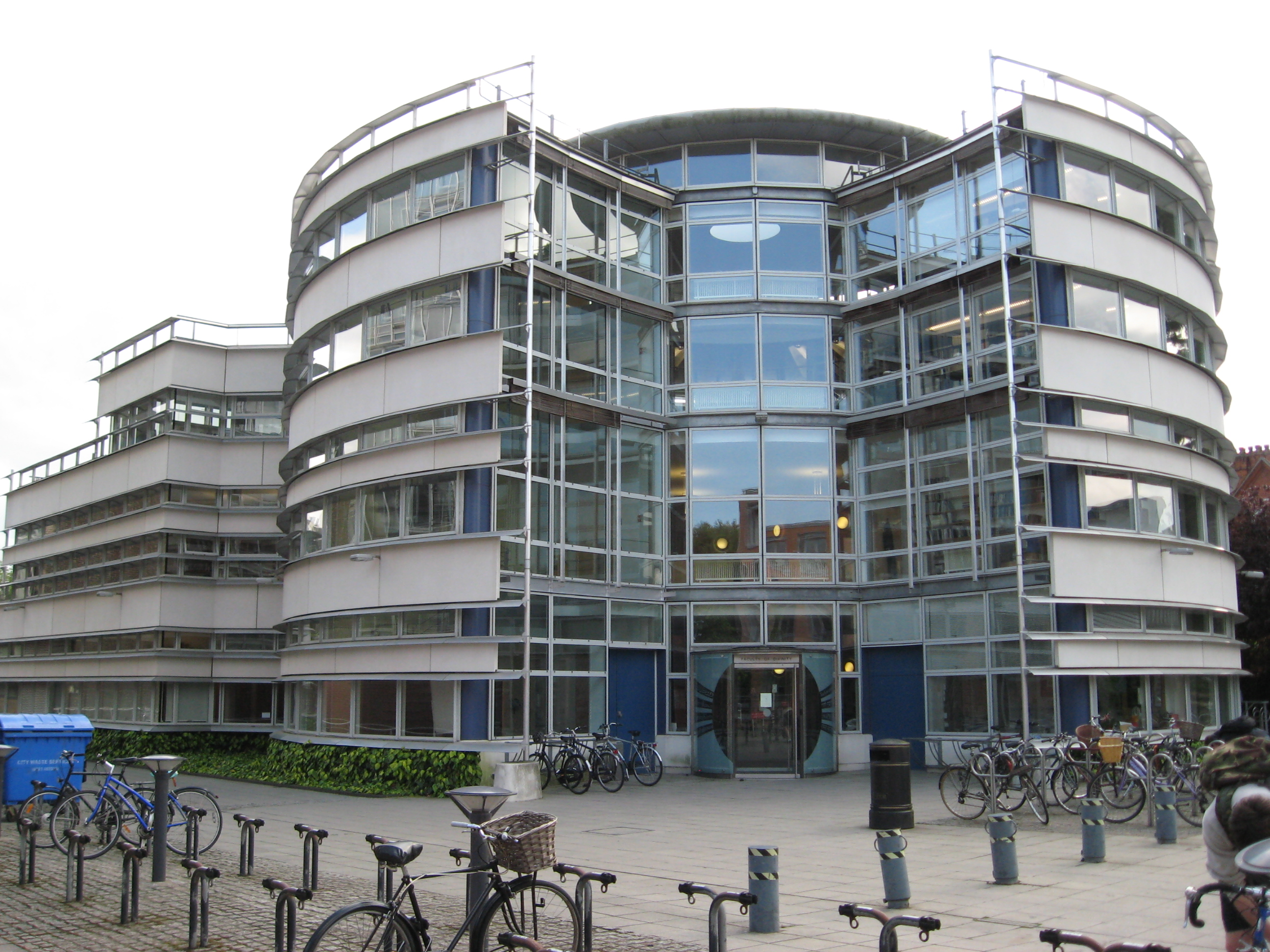
The Faculty of Divinity building, on the Sidgwick Site

The Sidgwick site is one of the largest sites of the University of Cambridge in Cambridge, England. It is home to several of the university's arts and humanities faculties. The site is named after the philosopher Henry Sidgwick, who studied at Cambridge in the 19th century.

== Overview and history ==
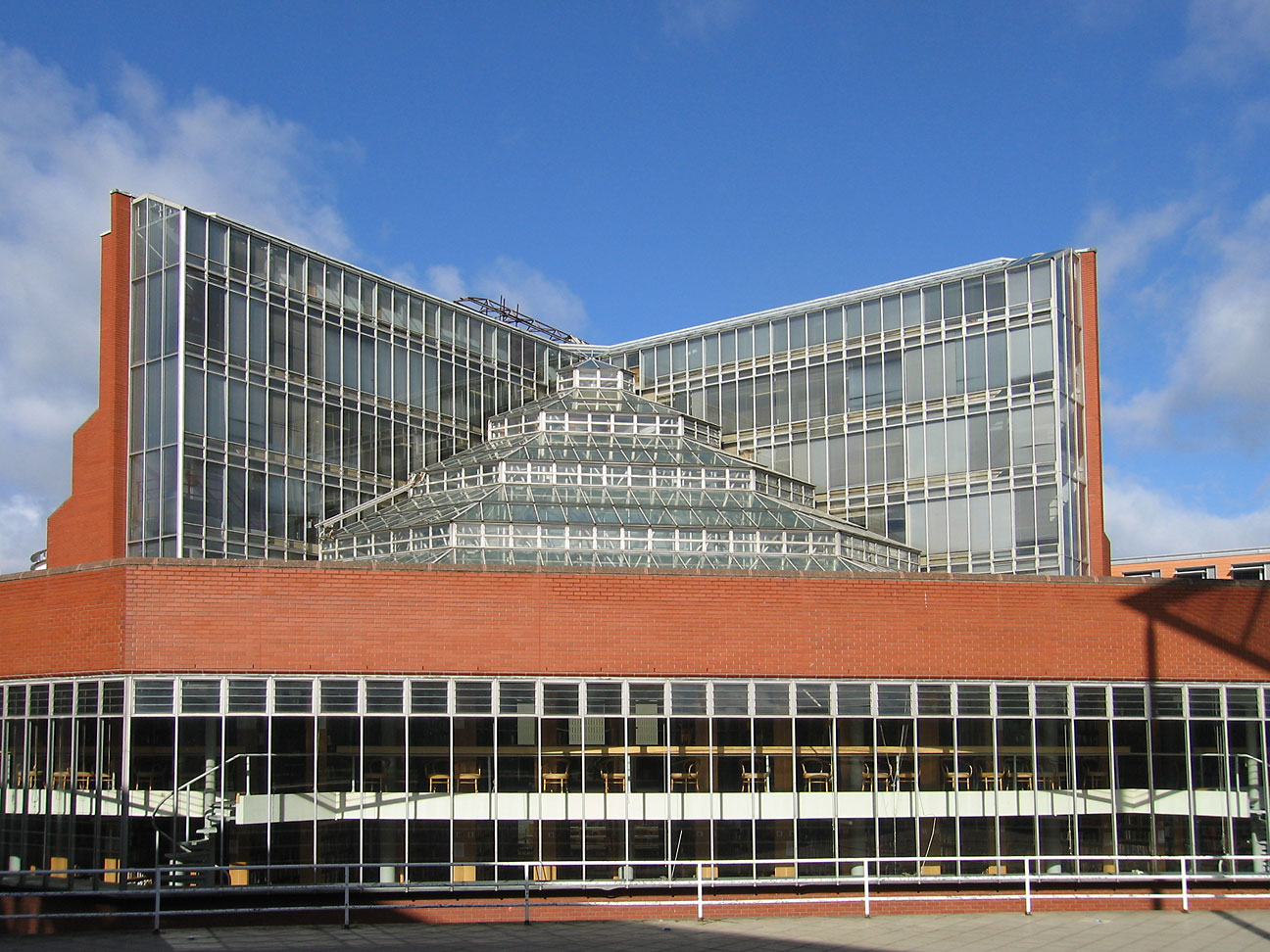
Seeley Historical Library, part of the Faculty of history

The Sidgwick site is located on the western side of Cambridge city centre, near the Backs. The site is north of Sidgwick Avenue and south of West Road The site has its origins in plans drawn up by Casson and Conder in 1952 for making use of land to the west of the Cambridge city centre which was previously used as cricket grounds for Corpus Christi College. Much of the site's current architecture derives from these original plans. However, many faculty buildings, especially to the north of the site, have been designed by separate architects with little reference to the coherence of the site as a whole. In July 2002, the old faculty of English, a converted Victorian villa, was demolished, and a more practical building designed by Allies and Morrison to reflect the needs of the faculty was completed in 2004. The Alison Richard Building, completed in 2012 and designed by Nicholas Hare Architects, brings together a number of different research groups (interdisciplinary geographical centres), the new department of politics and international studies and the Centre for Research in the Arts, Social Sciences and Humanities.

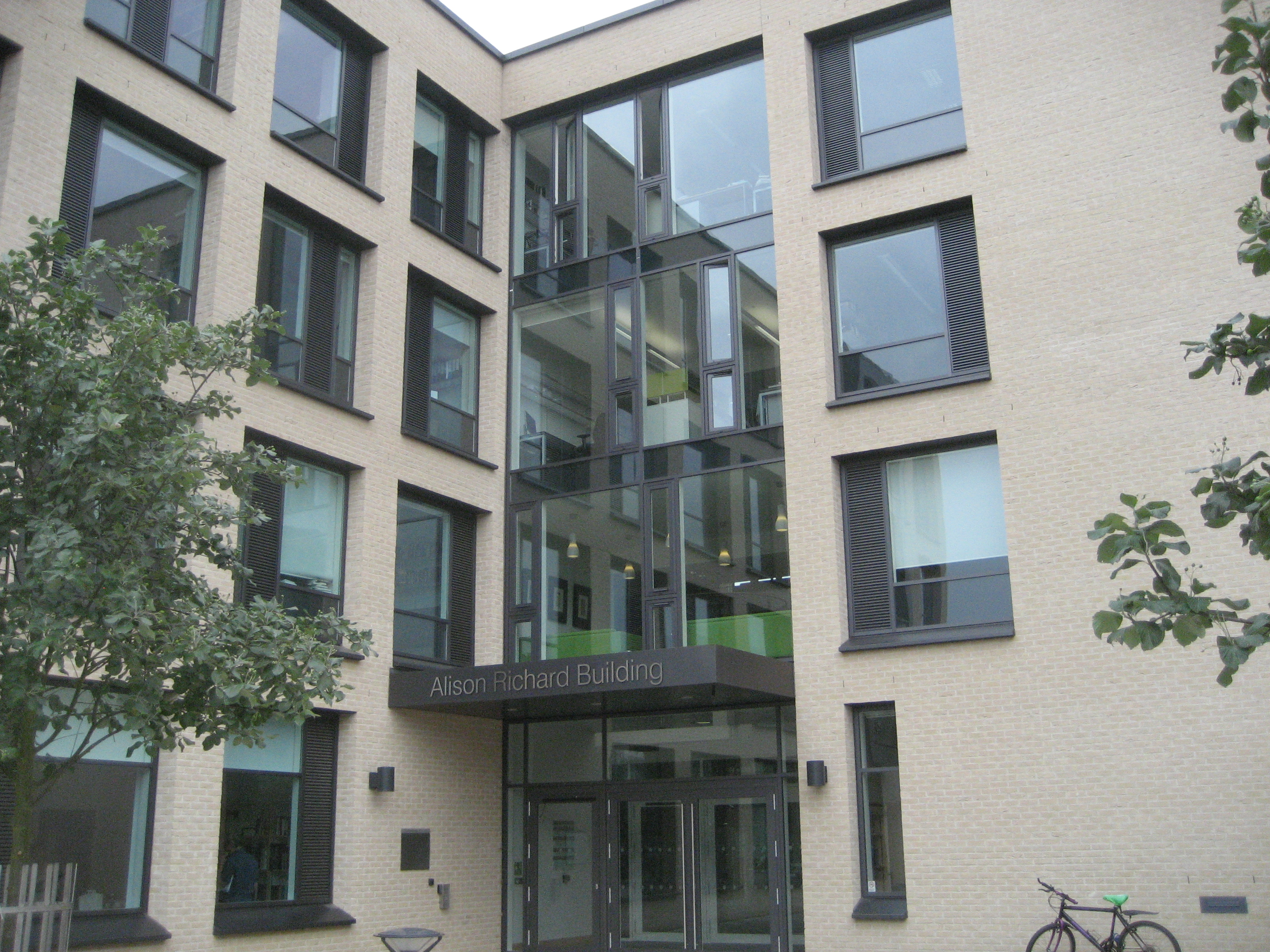
The Alison Richard Building

On 29 October 2006, Education Not For Sale supporters at Cambridge University organised the first occupation in the UK in protest at the introduction of top-up fees on the Sidgwick site lecture hall, occupying it for 12 hours. In 2009, Cambridge Gaza Solidarity occupied three lecture theatres and the common area of the law faculty. On 22 February 2022, Cambridge Defend Education, a student-led campaign group, occupied a lecture block declaring support for the University and College Union strike. Cambridge Students' Union, although not directly involved in the occupation issued a statement in support of the action, declaring themselves opposed to the marketisation of education.

Although less popular now, the site was formerly a thriving location with the local skateboarding community because of its undercover benches, numerous sets of stairs and L-shaped concrete banks. These features have since been amended to discourage skateboarding.

== Faculties on the Sidgwick site ==
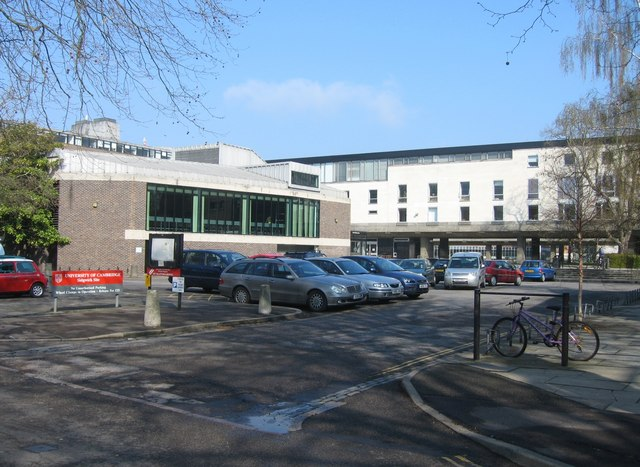
The southern entrance to the Sidgwick Site with the Lady Mitchell Hall (left) and the Raised Faculty Building (right)

The following University of Cambridge faculty and department buildings are located on the site:

- Department of politics and international studies
- Faculties of modern and medieval languages and linguistics and philosophy
- Faculty of Asian and Middle Eastern studies
- Faculty of classics with the Museum of Classical Archaeology
- Faculty of divinity
- Faculty of economics
- Faculty of history
- Faculty of law
- Faculty of music
- Faculty of English

== Facilities ==
The site has two cafes: the Buttery and the ARC Café.

The Cambridge University Islamic Society has a prayer room on the site, where it holds daily prayers.

== See also ==
- Lady Mitchell Hall, a large lecture theatre on the site
- Listed buildings in Cambridge (west)
