= Storey's Way =

Road in Cambridge, England

Coordinates: 52.2146°N 0.1031°E

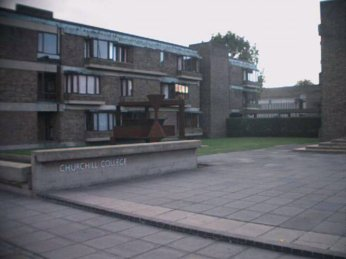
Main entrance of Churchill College on Storey's Way.

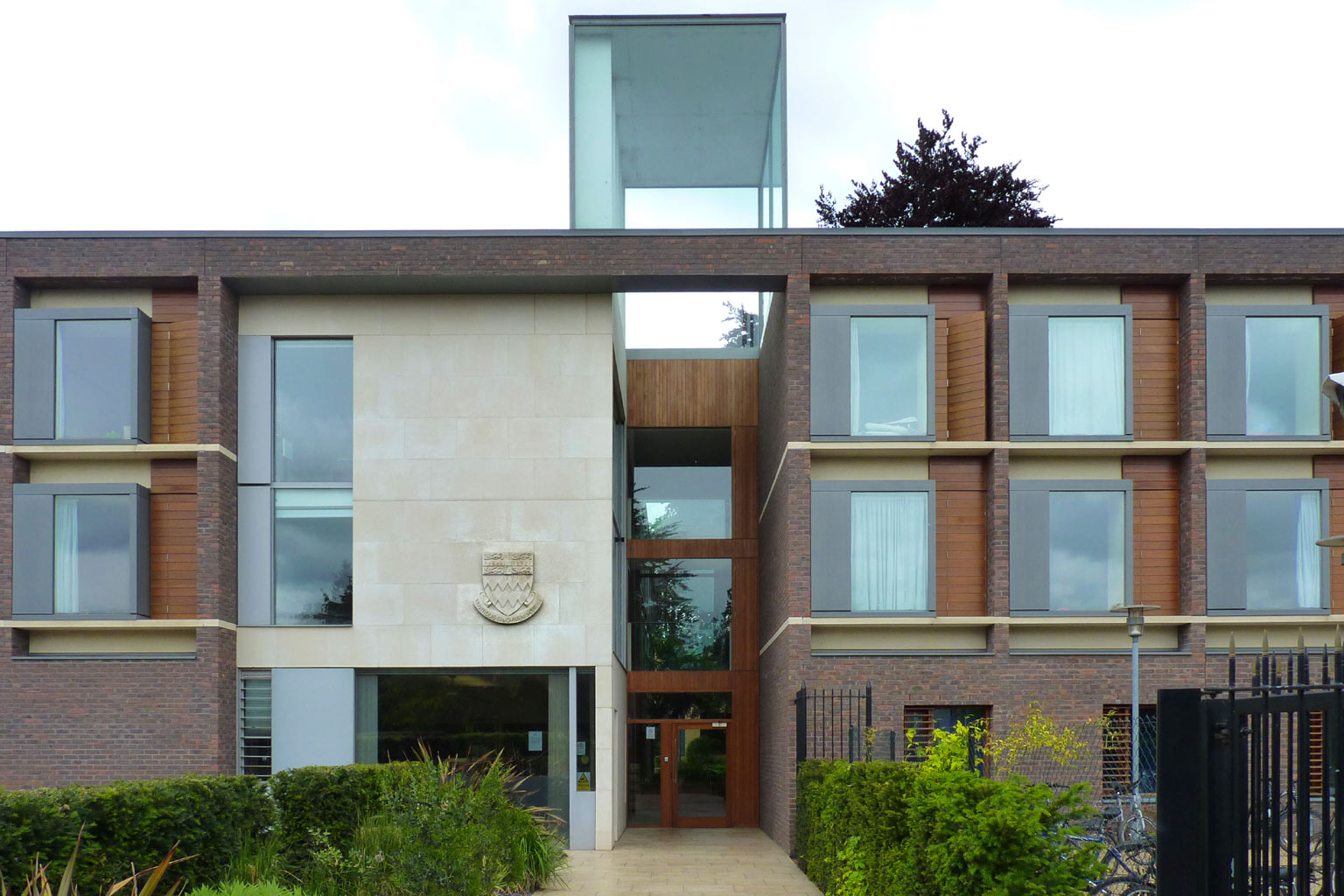
Main entrance and porters' lodge of Fitzwilliam College.

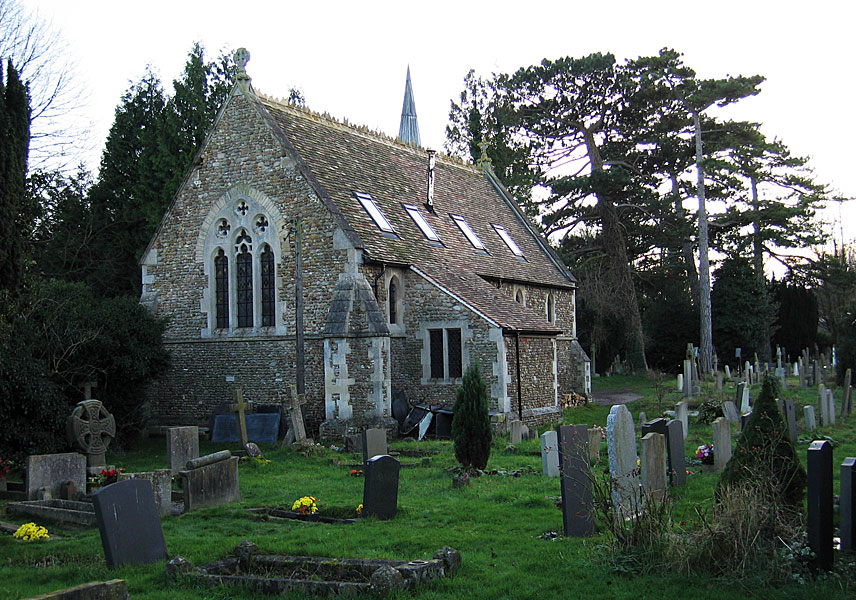
The chapel of the Ascension Parish Burial Ground, near Storey's Way off Huntingdon Road.

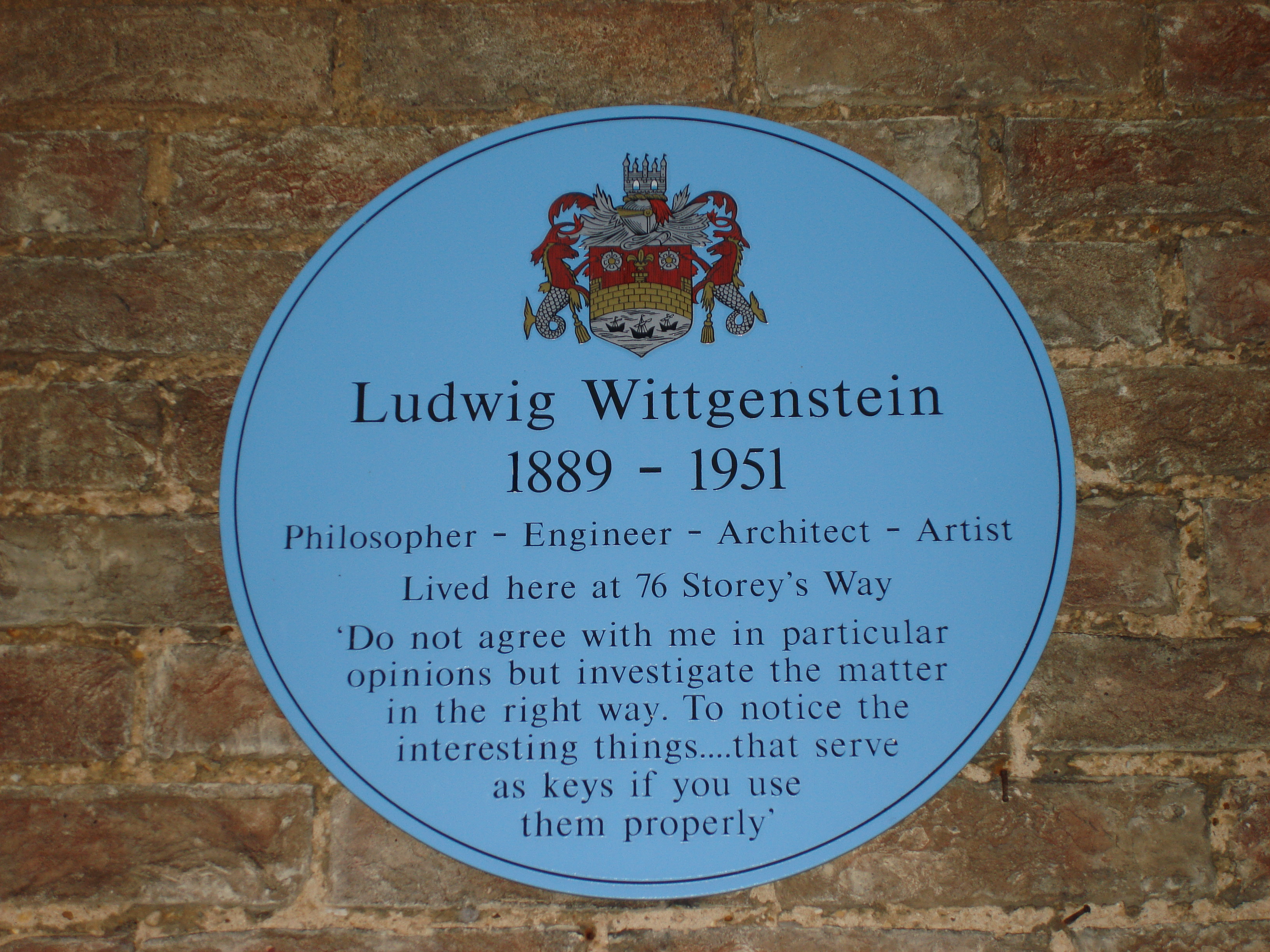
Ludwig Wittgenstein spent the last months of his life at 76 Storey's Way, then the home of his doctor, Edward Bevan.

Storey's Way is a mainly residential road, approximately 650 metres to the west of the city centre in Cambridge, England. It falls within the Castle Electoral Ward of Cambridge City Council, and feeds on to the major arterial roads Huntingdon Road to the north and Madingley Road to the west.

It is named after Edward Storey (died 1692), a local bookseller whose will requested that, should his son die without an heir of his own, his estate was to be used to buy land in Cambridge, for almshouses for the benefit of widows of clergymen of the Established Church, and for widows and maidens 'of sober life and conversation' of the parishes of St Giles and Holy Trinity. The 42 acres around the L-shaped plot that is now Storey's Way was allotted to Storey's charity in 1805. The Foundation of Edward Storey provides sheltered accommodation to those connected with the Church of England and others in need from its base in nearby Mount Pleasant in Cambridge.

Two University of Cambridge colleges, Churchill College and Fitzwilliam College, have main entrances on Storey's Way, as is the rear entrance to Murray Edwards College. Trinity Hall has modern student accommodation on Storey's Way and the Trinity Hall Sports Ground is located between Storey's Way and Huntingdon Road.

Also close to the road are:

- Ascension Parish Burial Ground, where many Cambridge academics are buried
- Cambridge Observatory
- Møller Centre for Continuing Education, Churchill College

The Storey's Way conservation area covers houses on Storey's Way at its northern end and the Trinity Hall sports ground. The road features large detached houses built in the early 20th century, including a number designed by the Arts and Crafts Movement architect Baillie Scott. Due to the high-quality houses, it is a desirable area. St John's College developed a parcel of its own land on Storey's Way from the early 1990s, and maintained the interesting architectural mix of the area, including the creation of 'The Crescent', a Regency townhouse crescent revival of some repute.

== See also ==
- Listed buildings in Cambridge (west), with fourteen buildings on Storey's Way
