= Madingley Road =

Road in Cambridge, England

Coordinates: 52.2119°N 0.0972°E

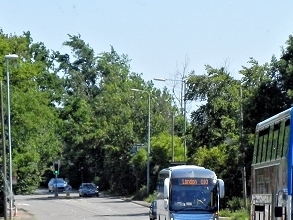
Rare semi-mature Plot elms, near the Madingley Road Park and Ride, Cambridge, 2013

Madingley Road is a major arterial road linking central Cambridge, England with Junction 13 of the M11 motorway. It passes by West Cambridge, a major new site where some University of Cambridge departments are being relocated.

The road is designated the A1303. At the eastern end, the A1303 continues as Northampton Street, then Chesterton Lane and Chesterton Road. There is a junction with the A1134 (Queen's Road) to the south.

At the Cambridge (east) end of the road, there are a number of large detached residences. Side streets include Grange Road and Wilberforce Road.

The village of Coton is south of the western end of Madingley Road.

== Buildings ==
The following are located on or close to Madingley Road:

- AVEVA Group plc
- British Antarctic Survey
- Cambridge American Cemetery and Memorial
- Cambridge Observatory
- Cavendish Laboratory
- Churchill College, on Storey's Way
- Computer Laboratory
- Lucy Cavendish College
- Marshall House (formerly Balliol Croft)
- Microsoft Research Cambridge
- Royal Greenwich Observatory
- Schlumberger Cambridge Research Centre
- School of Veterinary Science
- Cambridge University Athletics Track
- Whittle Laboratory
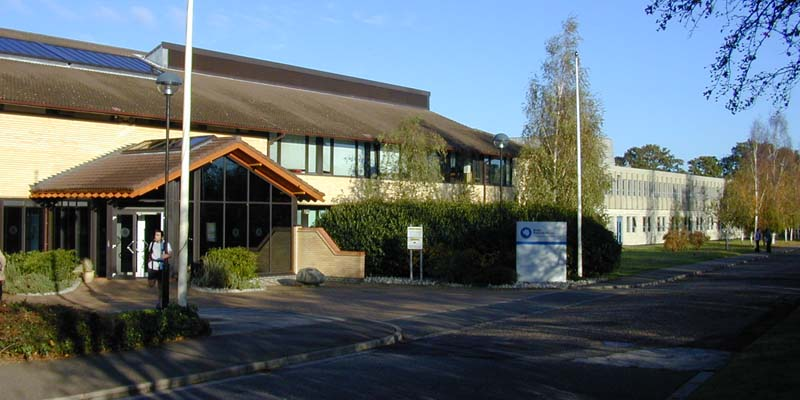
British Antarctic Survey headquarters on the south side of Madingley Road.

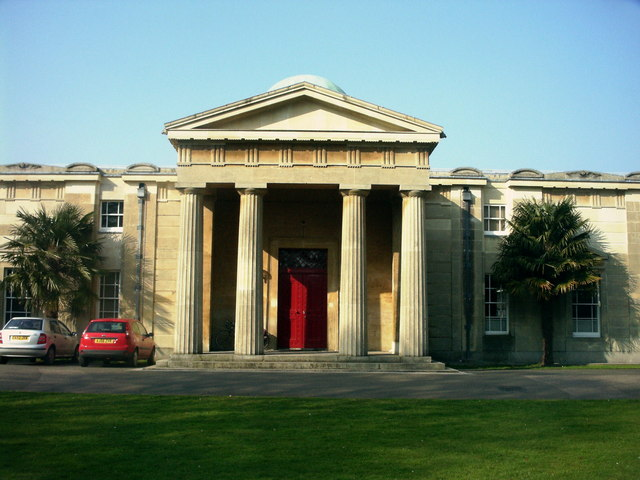
Main entrance to the Cambridge Observatory building, to the north of Madingley Road.

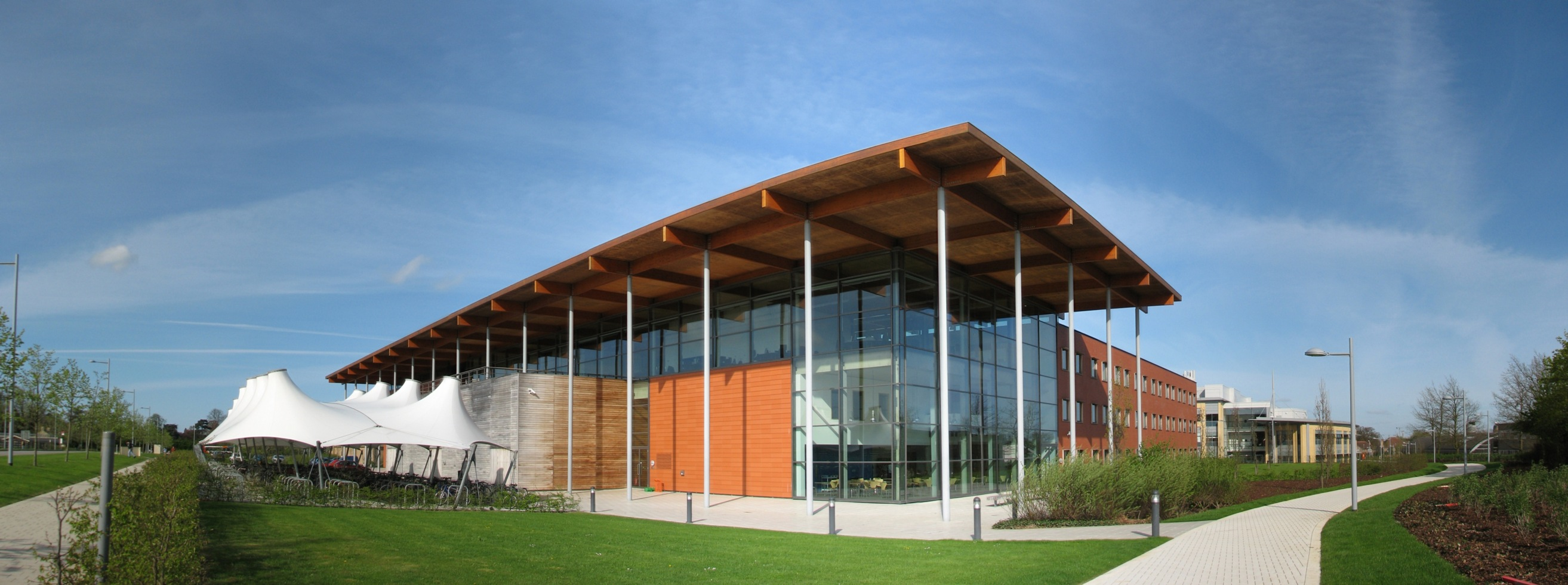
The University of Cambridge Computer Laboratory in West Cambridge, south of the Madingley Road.

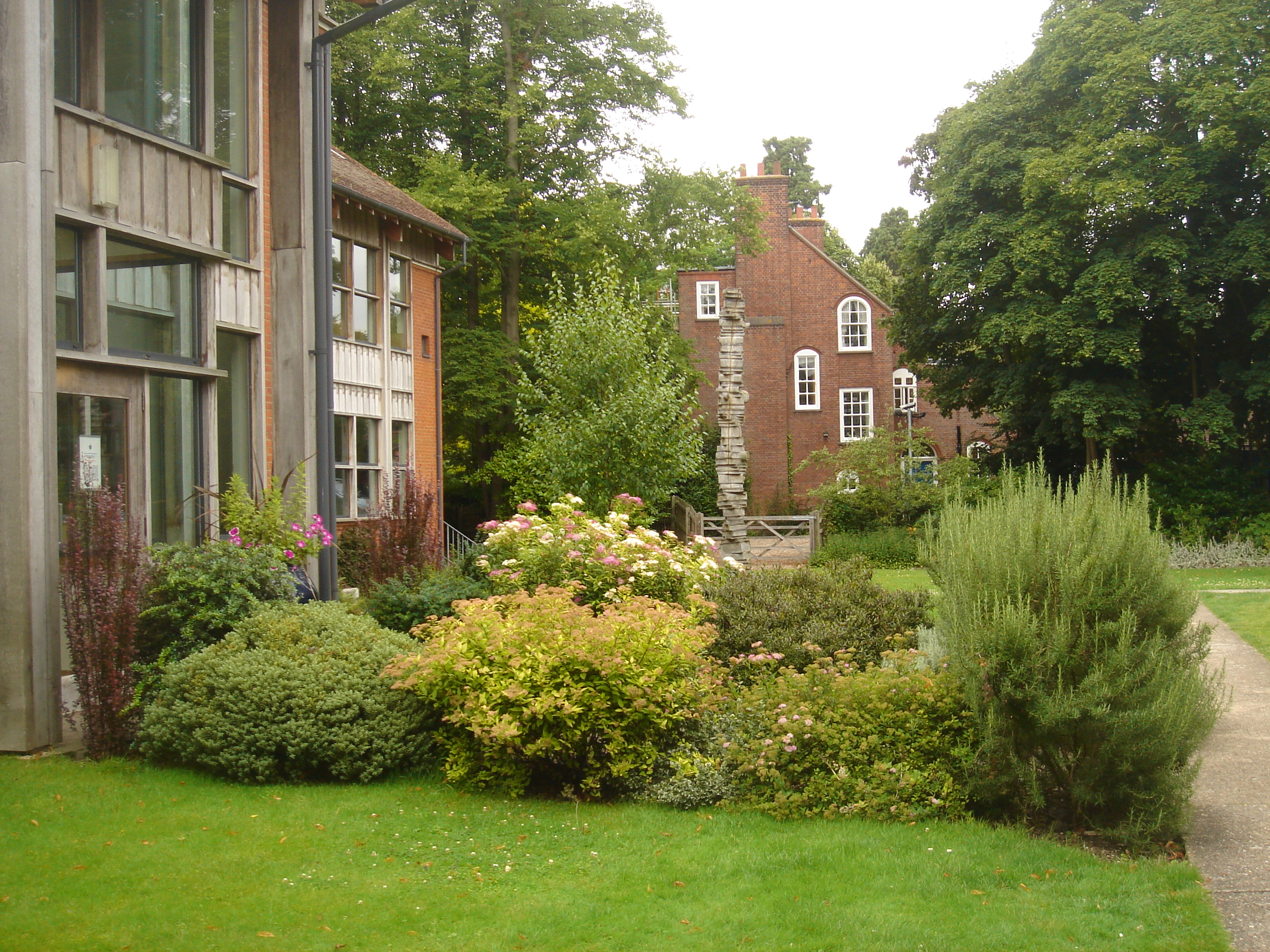
Lucy Cavendish College library and Marshall House off Madingley Road.

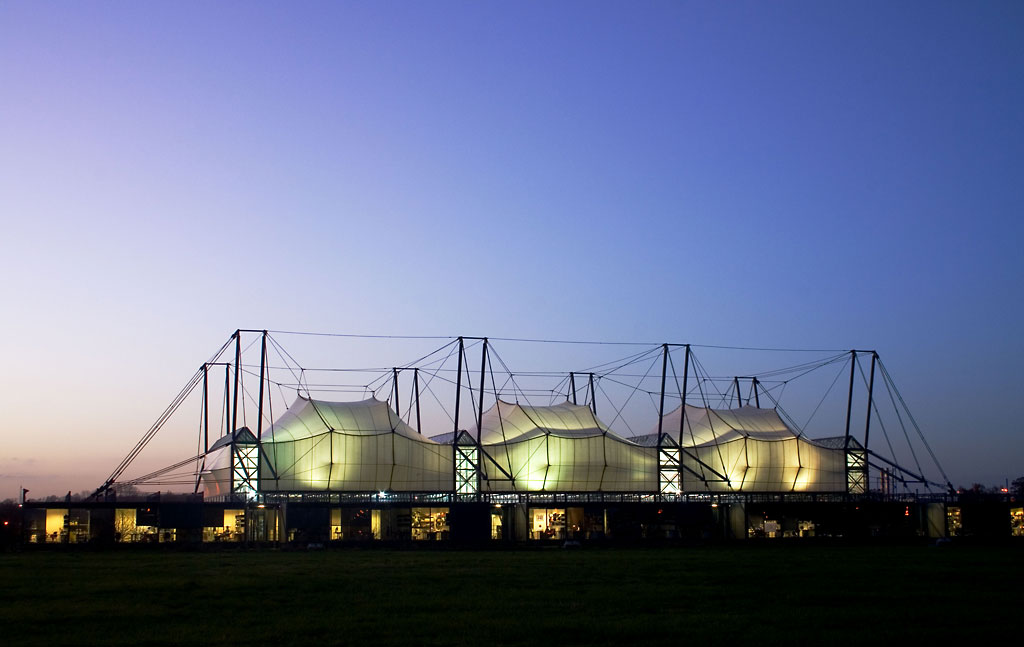
Schlumberger Cambridge Research Centre, High Cross, Madingley Road.

== Notable residents ==
The following have lived on or close to Madingley Road:

- Authors Kingsley Amis and his son Martin Amis as a child
- Author and priest A. C. Bouquet
- Inventor Clive Sinclair

== Botanical ==
One of the last known stands in England of rare semi-mature Plot elms, the Madingley Road elms descended from those described by botanists Elwes and Henry in 1913 and studied by R. H. Richens in 1960, was destroyed by Cambridge City Council for road-widening, between about 2007 and 2014.

== See also ==
- The village of Madingley, Cambridgeshire
- Conduit Head
- Listed buildings in Cambridge (west): describes eleven listed buildings on Madingley Road
