= Sidgwick Avenue =

Road in western Cambridge, England

Coordinates: 52.2004°N 0.1093°E

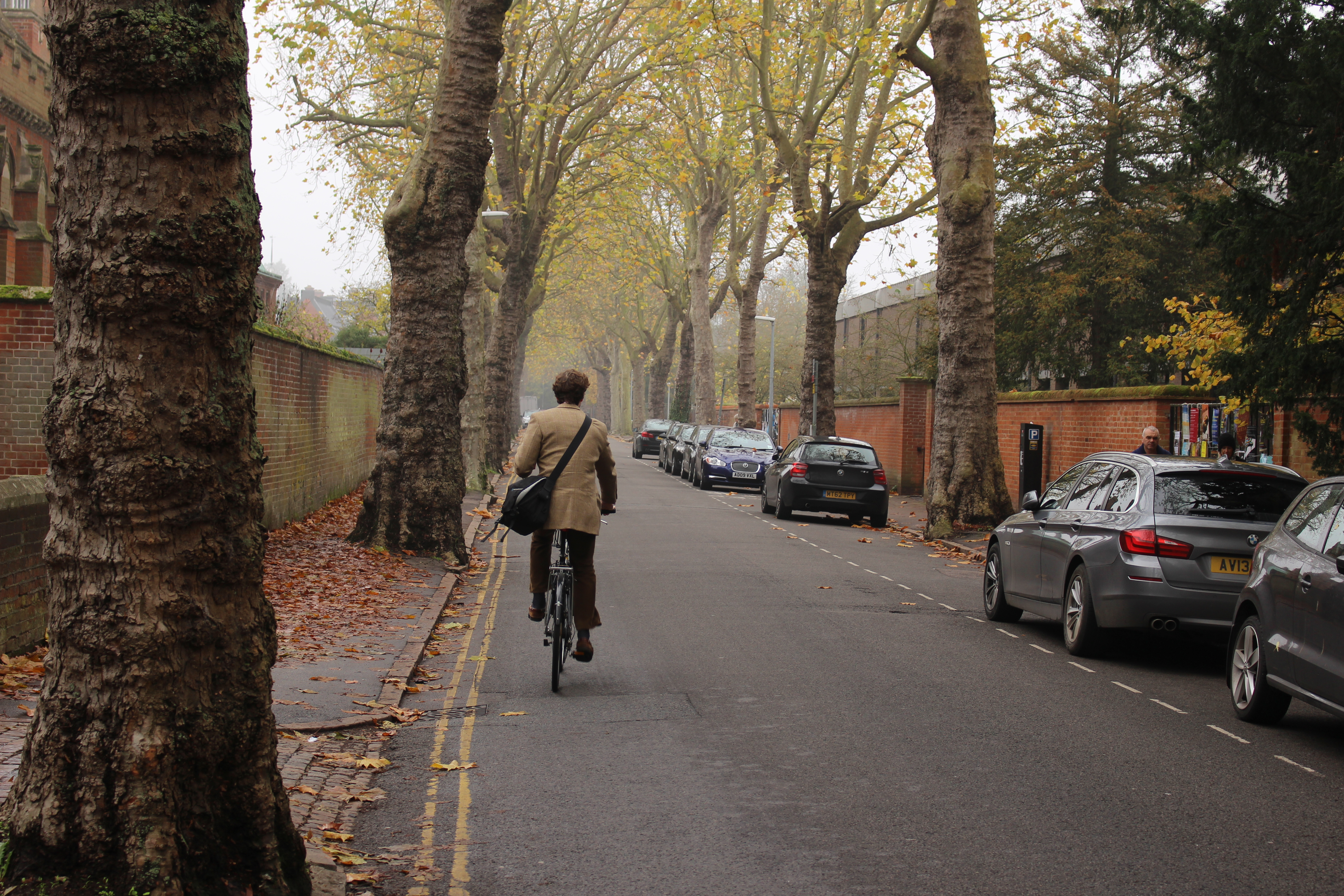
Sidgwick Avenue in Cambridge

Sidgwick Avenue is a road located in western Cambridge, England. The avenue runs east–west and links Grange Road to the west with Queen's Road to the east. The line of the road continues northeast into central Cambridge as Silver Street. Sidgwick Avenue is flanked by Newnham College, Ridley Hall, Selwyn College and the Sidgwick Site of the University of Cambridge.

== Location ==
The majority of the southern side of the avenue is occupied by Newnham College with Ridley Hall, a theological college affiliated with the university, to the east.

The Sidgwick Site, which is home to university faculties including Law, History, Economics and Politics, occupies much of the northern side of the road. Lady Mitchell Hall, the Museum of Classical Archaeology and the Marshall Library of Economics are also on the Sidgwick Site. To the west is the main part of Selwyn College and east of the Sidgwick site is the Harvey Court site of Gonville and Caius College.

The avenue is quite narrow and recent proposals have considered turning it into a pedestrian thoroughfare with carve outs for cycle lanes.

== History ==
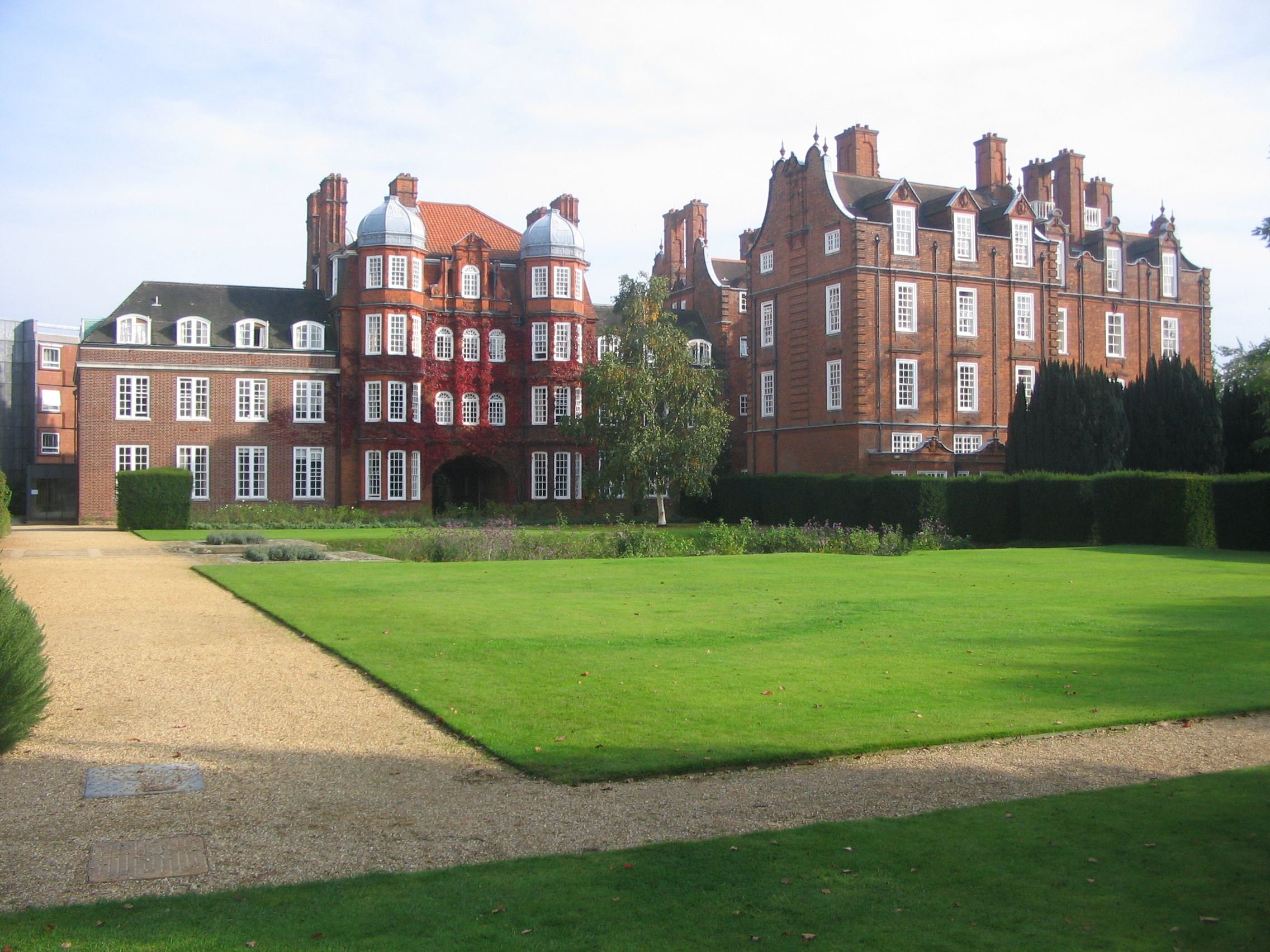
The Old Hall at Newnham College, the first University of Cambridge building on Sidgwick Avenue

Sidgwick Avenue's origins are somewhat unclear, however remains from the Roman period have been found near the area near Selwyn and Newnham Colleges, suggesting some early human settlement and use of the area.

The avenue was used under different names in the medieval and Tudor periods, with only sections of it near the City of Cambridge being paved with cobblestones. In the 19th century, the avenue became increasingly important and it was fully paved with cobbles and paving stones, some of which can be seen today. With the growth of Cambridge colleges during the 19th century, including Selwyn and Newnham, the avenue became more busy. Today, Sidgwick Avenue has become quite developed and serves as a link between the City of Cambridge and several colleges.

== Naming ==
According to the University of Cambridge, Sidgwick Avenue is named after Henry and Eleanor Sidgwick. The early progress of women's rights at Cambridge University owes much to Henry Sidgwick, a Philosophy fellow of Trinity College who championed the cause throughout his life. In 1871, with Anne Clough, the first Principal of Newnham College, and Eleanor Balfour (Sidgwick's future wife), Sidgwick oversaw the purchase of a house for five female students who wished to attend lectures but did not live near enough to the university to do so. The avenue was envisioned as home for several colleges of the university and as a cross-town route to connect the area. In 1875, the first building was built on Sidgwick Avenue site of Newnham College, now called Old Hall. In 1882, the Old Court of Selwyn College was built on the other side of Sidgwick Avenue.

== Gallery ==
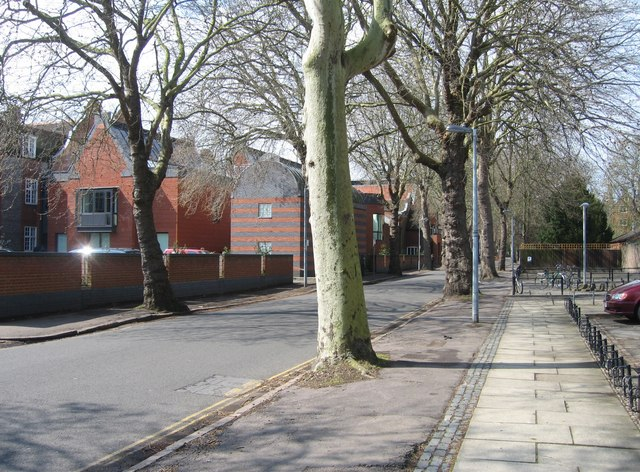
Sidgwick Avenue with Newnham to the left and the Sidgwick Site to the right

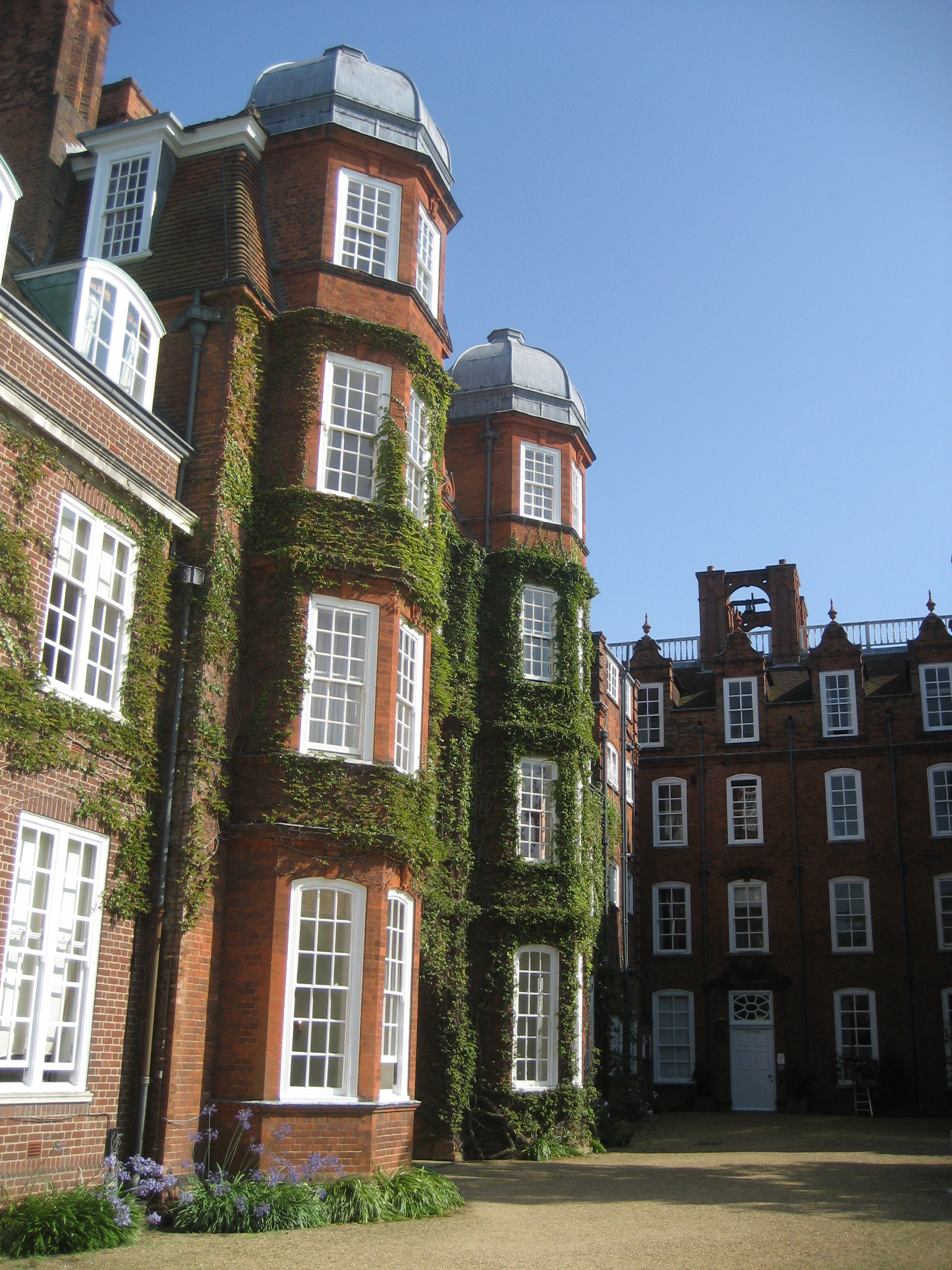
Newnham College

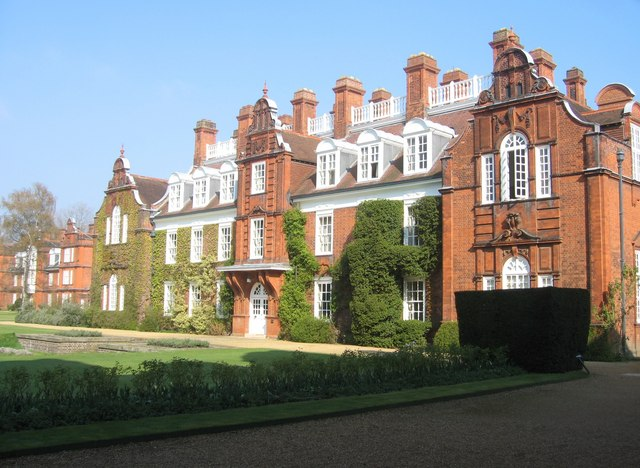
Sidgwick Hall and Library
