= 31 Madingley Road =

House in Cambridge, England

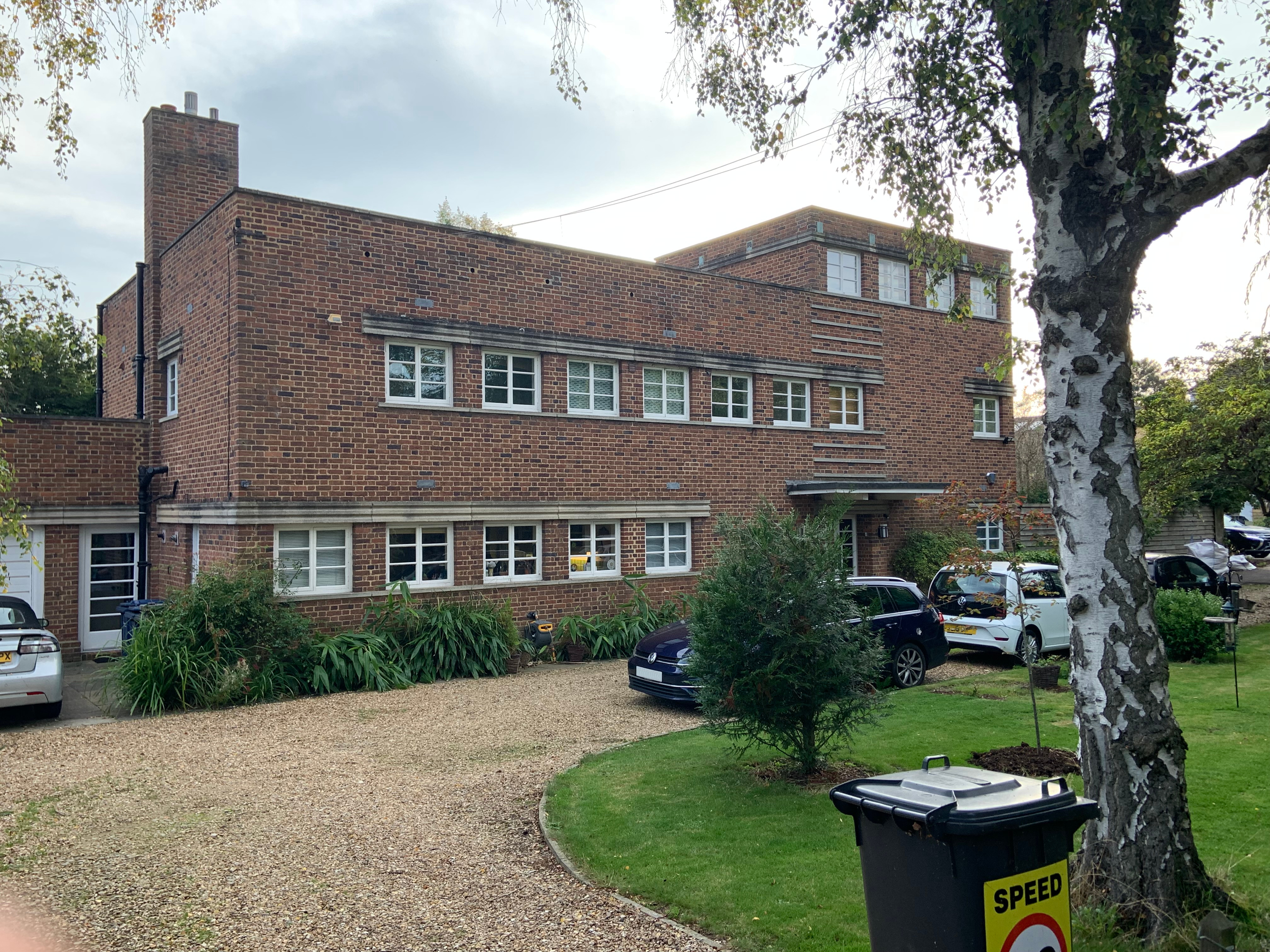
31 Madingley Road: front façade

31 Madingley Road is a Modernist red-brick house in Madingley Road, west Cambridge, England, designed by Marshall Sisson for the classical archaeologist A. W. Lawrence in 1931–32. It is one of the first Modernist-style houses in Cambridge, and is listed at grade II.

== Background and history ==
Development of the western outskirts of Cambridge accelerated in the late 19th century, particularly after college fellows were permitted to marry in 1882, but were required to live outside college. Substantial detached family houses set in plots of 0.5–1.0 acres were built in and around Madingley Road, Grange Road and Huntingdon Road, to accommodate married academics and well-off professionals, often designed by well-known London-based architects, including M. H. Baillie Scott, J. J. Stevenson, E. S. Prior and Ernest Newton. Most of the houses in west Cambridge were traditional in style, particularly Arts and Crafts movement. Nearly all of the land was owned by the Cambridge colleges, particularly St John's College, and was leased under restrictive terms that required the development of expensive high-quality houses, often specifying red-brick construction (rather than the local white brick) with a tiled roof. In 1914, on college-owned land, there was no working-class housing, and the area lacked shops, community facilities and churches. Expansion westwards along Madingley Road before the First World War stopped at the junction with Storey's Way. In 1922–31, St John's leased nine plots for development on Madingley Road, of which number 31 was presumably one. Shortly afterwards, the college obtained consent for two new roads, completed in 1933: Wilberforce Road, which joins Madingley Road immediately adjacent to number 31, and Clarkson Road, which runs behind number 31. The majority of houses on Madingley Road were built in 1926–38.

31 Madingley Road was among the first Modernist houses to be completed in Cambridge. Twelve Modernist houses in the town, mainly in the west, dating to the interwar period are listed in a 1996 gazetteer; the earliest – White House, on the north side of Madingley Road at the junction with Conduit Head Road, designed by George Checkley for himself – dates from 1930 to 1931 and is an example of a concrete-framed Cubist construction drawing direct inspiration from Le Corbusier's work in France. Unrendered brick, as opposed to concrete or brick rendered to appear white, was an unusual choice for a Modernist building of this date.

The architect, Marshall Sisson (1897–1978), had set up his practice in 1928 in London. In his early career he designed several Modernist buildings in Cambridge and elsewhere, some of which – 31 Madingley Road being the best known – married modern design with traditional materials. They are influenced by James Burford (1895–1967), one of his teachers at University College, London. After completing 31 Madingley Road, Sisson characterised the house (as well as similar buildings) as "Essentially 'Traditional' in that it ... represents a serious attempt to find a contemporary expression for the directional character of Western culture ... predominantly realistic and factual, expressed in the emphatic horizontality, simplification and rigid systematization". He used concrete in his later Modernist house in Cambridge: 26 Millington Road, built in 1934–35 for another classical archaeologist, A. J. B. Wace. Sisson turned wholly to traditional styles after 1935, including the Neo-Georgian Orchard Building at Pembroke College (1954–57).

31 Madingley Road was commissioned by the classical archaeologist A. W. Lawrence (1900–91), who had been appointed to the Laurence readership in classical archaeology at the University of Cambridge in 1930. He and Sisson were friends, having met at the British School at Rome in the mid-1920s. Lawrence's household then comprised his wife, Barbara née Innes, their young daughter and a maid. Lawrence's brief referred to "Mason Citron" (Maison Citrohan), Le Corbusier's plan for a family house, and requested a garage, central heating and accommodation for the maid with separate access. As the site belonged to St John's College, the approval of the college's building committee was required for the design. The house cost more than £4,000, which is relatively expensive for a house on Madingley Road at the time. Lawrence considered that the traditional building material and the expense would be factors promoting St John's approval of the design. The house was constructed in 1931–32. The family did not remain at 31 Madingley Road; in 1951 Lawrence took up a post in the Gold Coast and on his return to the UK, lived in Yorkshire.

The building was listed at grade II in 1996.

== Location ==
The house is at TL 43676 59080 on the south side of Madingley Road, at the junction with Wilberforce Road. It lies within the West Cambridge conservation area. Number 31 is set back from the road on a medium-sized plot with a line of large trees obscuring it from Wilberforce Road. Its former neighbour 35 Madingley Road, a large red-brick building of around 1750, is one of the oldest buildings in the conservation area and is also listed at grade II. Immediately behind number 31 is 1 Wilberforce Road, a single-storey house built in 1965, behind which the University of Cambridge's new Centre for Mathematical Sciences was completed in around 2002. Two houses on Wilberforce Road dating from before the Second World War are Modernist in style, numbers 9 (Dora Cosens; 1937) and 19 (H. C. Hughes; 1933–34). 31 Madingley Road now stands opposite some of the original accommodation blocks of Churchill College, which are listed at grade II.

== Description ==
31 Madingley Road is in red brick with dressings in cast stone, a form of concrete. There are two or three storeys under a flat roof. The style is described as "Early Modern Movement" in the listing, and the architectural historians Simon Bradley and Nikolaus Pevsner detect influences from Dutch Modernism. They describe it as "very horizontal and blocky and Netherlandish". The historian Matthew Sturgis describes the building as a "stylish essay in brick", with a "long, low" profile that he considers relates to Sisson's view that "modern architecture [draws] its energy from the horizontal". The building is designed in a modular fashion, using a repeat unit of 5 feet 3 inches, determined by the brick dimensions. Louise Campbell considers that besides being intended to limit costs, the repetition also contributes to the building's unified appearance.

The front (north) façade has an asymmetrically placed inset entrance reached by two shallow brick steps, which is surmounted by a plain horizontal canopy, significantly wider than the doorway. Vertically above the entrance, a series of horizontal cast stone bands of the same width as the doorway run up to the base of the second storey. The ground floor has five relatively small two-light wooden windows to the left and one to the right of the entrance. The windows are surmounted by a prominent decorative lintel made of cast stone, with three bands, which is continuous over the series of windows and interrupted on the ground floor at the entrance. Sturgis describes these banded lintels as "touches of restrained detail" that draw attention to the building's profile. The first floor has eight similar windows, also surmounted by a three-banded lintel, with a series of seven to the left (offset compared with the ground-floor windows) and one to the right. The long series of repeated windows with uniform spacing is typical of Sisson's style in both Modernist and traditional buildings. There is a three-storey section at the west end, above and to the right of the entrance; the second floor has four similar windows, which are topped by a lintel with just two bands.

The garden (south) front has an uninterrupted series of ten similar windows at the first-floor level, again surmounted by a long continuous three-banded lintel. At the ground level the seven windows are interspersed with French doors and a doorway; they are surmounted by a three-banded lintel and offset from the first-floor windows. The pattern of ground-floor windows and doors on this face has been altered from the original design, with the addition of entrances. (Note: Compare the 1932 and 2003 photographs archived at RIBA.)

The original design was for a roof garden with a pergola at the west end (visible in a 1932 photograph) and a partly enclosed area that covered the access stairway; both the pergola and the stairway area were later fully enclosed to form the three-storey section. The current flat roof is covered with roofing felt, and has an undecorated parapet; a chimney stack rises at the east end.

On the interior, the ground-floor accommodation includes sitting and dining rooms, a separate small sitting room for the maid, a study, and a large kitchen. The original built-in cupboards in the kitchen were present at the time of listing. The large hall is internal and receives its illumination from the upper storey; it has an open staircase with chromium banisters. The first floor has four bedrooms and a playroom.

== See also ==
- Listed buildings in Cambridge (west)
