= Salix, Conduit Head Road =

Modernist house in west Cambridge, England

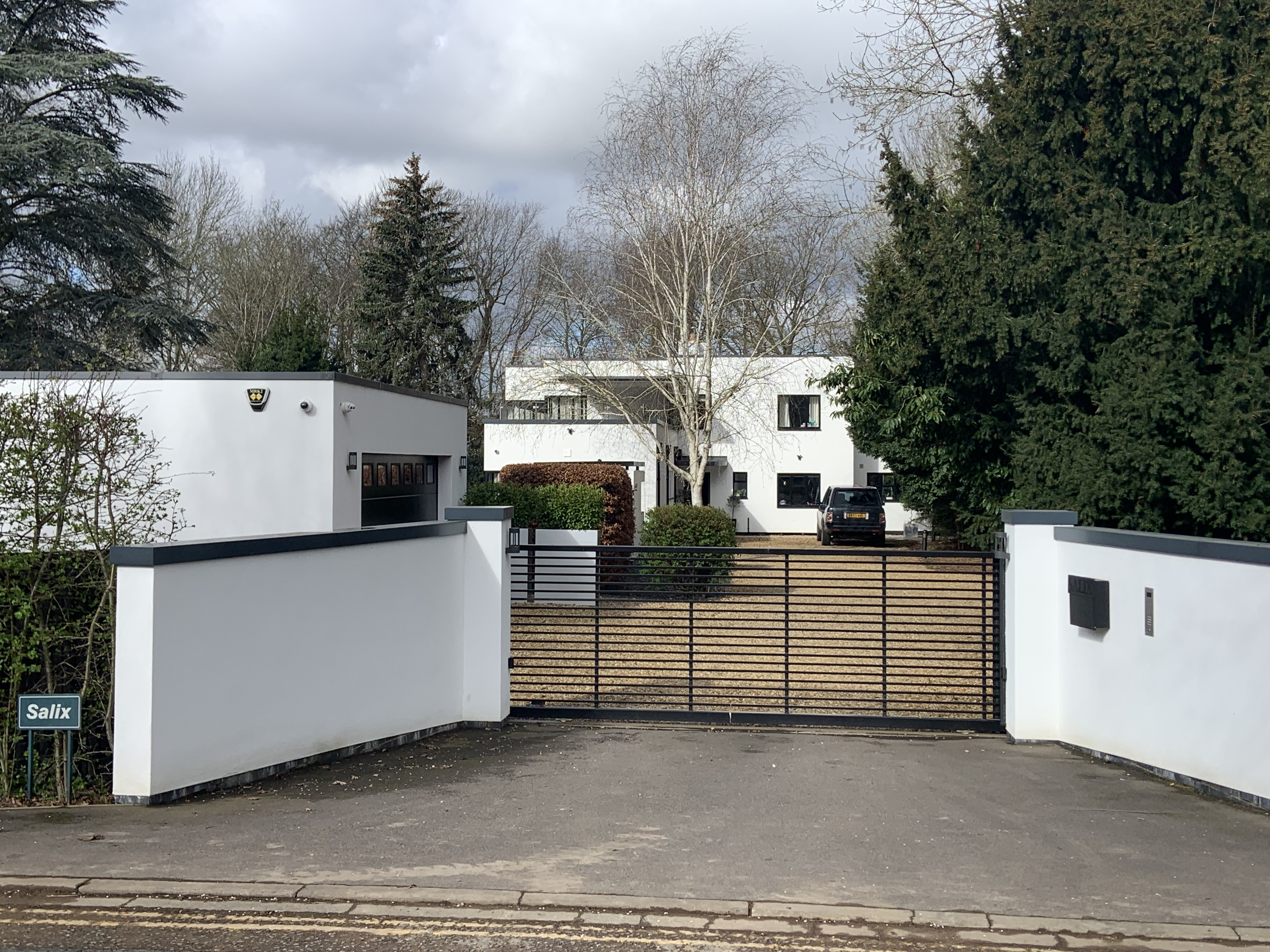
Salix

Salix, Conduit Head Road, originally known as Brandon Hill or Brandon House, is a grade-II-listed Modernist house in west Cambridge, England. Built in 1933–34 by H. C. Hughes for the physicist, Mark Oliphant, the L-shaped house is in the International Modern style, in brick covered with white-painted render, with a flat roof and a roof terrace. It features multiple prominent corner windows.

== Background and history ==
Cambridge has an unusual concentration of Modernist houses, with twelve dating to the interwar period. H. C. Hughes (1893–1976) was a Cambridge-based architect who designed the earliest Modernist university building, the Mond Laboratory (1931–32), as well as the earliest college building in a modern style, Fen Court, Peterhouse (1939–40). Salix was his earliest private house in the Modernist style. His others were also commissioned by academics at the university; they include 19 Wilberforce Road (1933–34) for the historian Zachary N. Brooke, and Postan in Sylvester Road (1939), for the historians Michael Postan and Eileen Power, now part of Robinson College. The client in this case, the Australian physicist Mark Oliphant (1901–2000), came to Cambridge in 1927 to work at the Cavendish Laboratory under Ernest Rutherford, and was elected a fellow at St John's College in 1934. He did not long remain in Cambridge after the house was completed, taking up a chair at the University of Birmingham in 1937.

Conduit Head Road is a branched and winding cul-de-sac running north from Madingley Road, in the western outskirts of the town, around 1.5 miles north-west of the centre, and immediately west of the Cambridge Observatory. The entirety of the tree-lined, semi-rural road is designated as a conservation area, which includes multiple listed buildings as well as a wilderness area with ponds, probably resulting from past brick-making; it dates from before 1925. The architectural historians Nikolaus Pevsner and Simon Bradley describe the road as "a progressive enclave" which attracted academics such as the Cornford and Darwin families. The earliest houses in the area were clustered at what is now the north end of the road, and followed a traditional design: Conduit Head (1910), Conduit Rise (originally Grithow Field; 1913 or 1914) and Clement's End (around 1926). From the 1930s, a diverse group of Modernist houses were built in an ad hoc fashion; Bradley and Pevsner describe them as forming the "best collection of 1930s Modernist houses" in Cambridge. Salix forms part of a group of three white Modernist houses, which were originally set in extensive grounds and adjacent to the wilderness area. Two were built on adjacent plots by George Checkley, White House (1930–31) and Willow House (originally Thurso; 1932–33); Salix (then known as Brandon Hill) was interposed between the two in 1933–34. It was extended in 1936.

In March 1939, the house was on the market, described as an "unusually Attractive and Distinctive Residence... Exceptionally well planned to obtain maximum amount of sun. Charming garden." It then had three reception rooms, six bedrooms and two bathrooms. In the late 1930s, Brandon Hill was occupied by the mathematician Gordon Welchman, a fellow of Sidney Sussex College. By the early 1960s the house was owned by a doctor, James Anderson Young, and was still known as Brandon Hill.

By the late 1960s, the house had been renamed Salix and was occupied by the Swiss nuclear physicist Egon Bretscher (1901–73); his widow Hanni Bretscher remained there until her death in 1993, when the house was sold. The advertised asking price was £275,000; the interior then had two kitchens, pantry, sitting room, dining room, five bedrooms and three bathrooms. The house was renovated in the mid-1990s by Michael Walton, including taking out some interior walls to extend the kitchen into a kitchen–diner.

Salix was listed at grade II in 1992.

== Description ==
Salix stands at TL4284359361 on the west side of Conduit Head Road, near the junction with Madingley Road. It is in the International Modern style, following Le Corbusier, on an L-shaped plan with a flat roof and a roof terrace. It is constructed of brick, on a concrete frame, and is rendered and painted white. There are two storeys, both L-shaped, but the upper one is much reduced in size, giving views over the roof terrace. The architectural historian Charles McKean likens the truncated upper storey to the "bridge of a square stranded ocean liner."

The main south façade is seven windows in length. The two-storey west wing projects on the south face. In the original layout, this part had a central hall around which were the kitchen, living room and internal garage on the ground floor. The narrow elongated single-storey east wing (five windows in length), beneath the roof terrace, was devoted to sleeping accommodation. The first floor was extended to the south west in 1936.

A notable feature is that several windows wrap around corners. McKean and the architectural photographer Tim Rawle describe Salix as the earliest Cambridge building to emphasise the placement of windows around corners, writing that it shows the walls to be independent of the concrete frame. At the time of listing (before the mid-1990s restoration), the windows retained their original metal frames, with the window sills on the ground floor joining together to give a continuous line.

The interior at the time of listing retained the original hardwood doors and unpierced balustrade to the stairs.

== See also ==
- Listed buildings in Cambridge (west)

== Further reading and external links ==
- The Architects' Journal, pp. 298–99 (30 August 1934)
- Ken Powell, Nick Dawe. The Modern House Today, p. 152 (Black Dog Publishing; 2001) ISBN 9781901033724
- On the market: 1930s H C Hughes-designed modernist property in Cambridge, Cambridgeshire – Photographs at WowHaus blog, including interiors
- Conduit Head Road: Salix (Brandon House) – Photograph at Cambridge2000
