= White House, Cambridge =

Modernist house in Cambridge, England

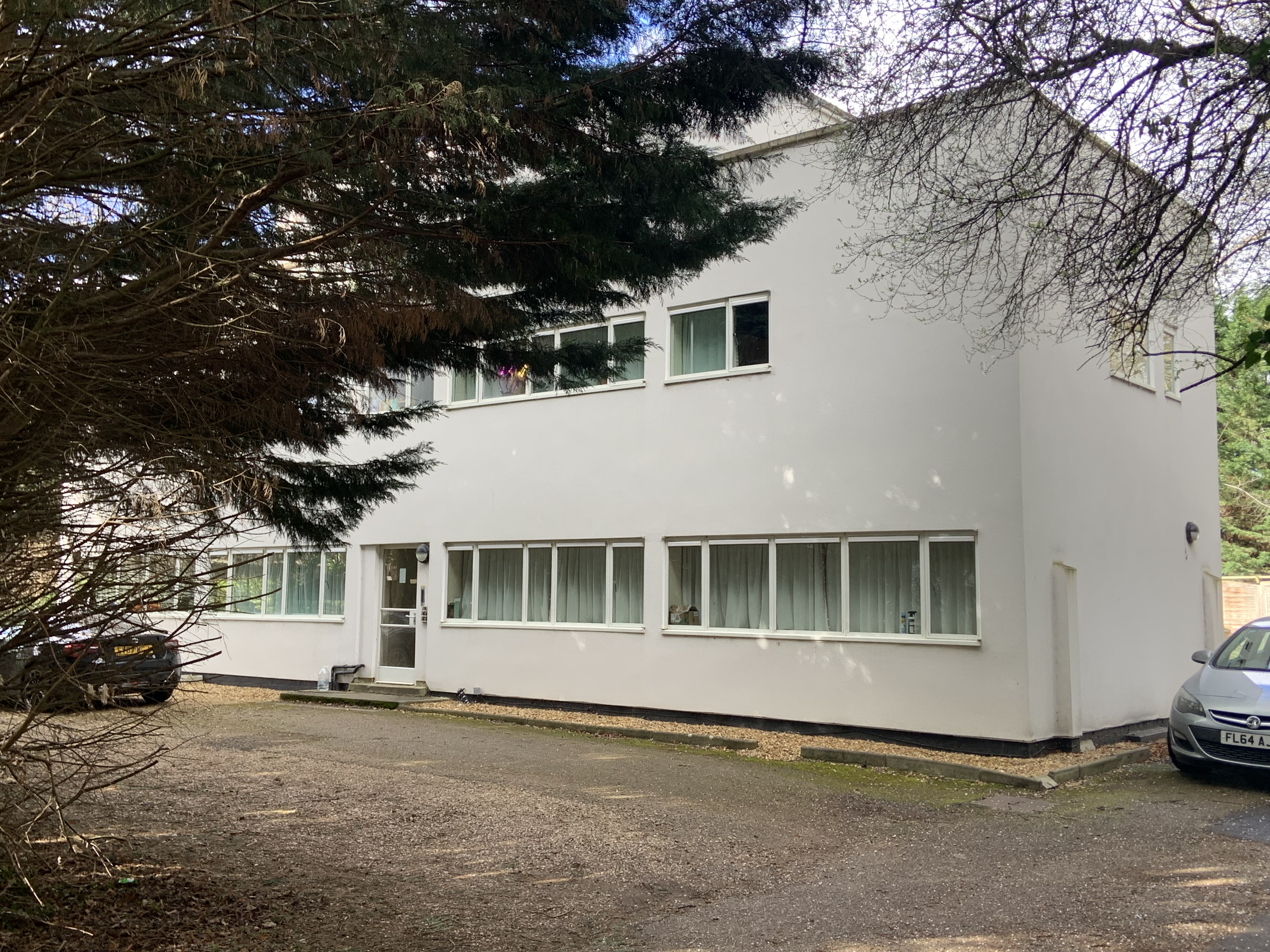
White House: east (front) face

The White House, Conduit Head Road is a Modernist house in west Cambridge, in Cambridgeshire, England, at the junction with Madingley Road. The first Modernist-style house in Cambridge and one of the earliest in Britain, it dates from 1930–31, and was designed by the New Zealand-born architect George Checkley for his own use. The house, a flat-roofed, white-rendered Cubist construction drawing direct inspiration from Le Corbusier's work in France, is an example of the International Style. It is listed at grade II.

== Background and history ==
The White House is the first house in Cambridge to be designed in the Modernist style, and one of the earliest in Britain. The house is an example of a flat-roofed, white-rendered Cubist construction drawing direct inspiration from Le Corbusier's work in France, referred to as the International Style or International Modern style. The architect, George Checkley (1893–1960), is one of the group credited with introducing Modernist buildings to the UK. Born in New Zealand, he studied at the University of Liverpool's School of Architecture and the British School at Rome, before taking up a position at the University of Cambridge's School of Architecture in 1928. White House was designed to be his personal house. Cambridge has an unusual concentration of Modernist houses, with twelve dating to the interwar period; other early examples include the nearby 31 Madingley Road, designed by Marshall Sisson (1931–32).

The White House stands at the south end of Conduit Head Road, on the junction with Madingley Road, at TL4284259307. Conduit Head Road is a branched and winding cul-de-sac running north from Madingley Road, in the western outskirts of the town, around 1.5 miles north-west of the centre, and immediately west of the Cambridge Observatory. The entirety of the tree-lined, semi-rural road is designated as a conservation area, which includes multiple listed buildings as well as a wilderness area with ponds, probably resulting from past brick-making; it dates from before 1925. The architectural historians Nikolaus Pevsner and Simon Bradley describe the road as "a progressive enclave" which attracted academics such as the Cornford and Darwin families. The earliest houses in the area were clustered at what is now the north end of the road, and followed a traditional design: Conduit Head (1910), Conduit Rise (originally Grithow Field; 1913 or 1914) and Clement's End (around 1926). From the 1930s, a diverse group of Modernist houses were built in an ad hoc fashion; Bradley and Pevsner describe them as forming the "best collection of 1930s Modernist houses" in Cambridge. White House, built in 1930–31, was the first of these.

The plot of 0.75 acres was leased from Trinity College, which owned much of the land surrounding the Trinity Head Conduit spring. By October 1931, the house was on the market for £2,800, estimated as around the building cost, but failed to sell; it was reported as having been let in March of the following year. In 1932–33, Checkley designed a second Modernist house, on the adjacent plot on Conduit Head Road, Willow House (originally Thurso), and Salix (formerly Brandon Hill), a Modernist house by H. C. Hughes, was interposed between the two in 1933–34. The three form a group of white Modernist houses, which were originally set in extensive grounds and adjacent to the wilderness area.

By 1971, the building had been divided into five flats. In 1972, White House was threatened with demolition in favour of a block of flats, which was eventually sited within its garden, but cut the house off from the street. White House was listed at grade II in 1992. In 2009, it housed students from St John's College.

== Description ==
White House is a rectangular building with a flat roof, in the International Modern style. It is constructed in brick on a concrete frame, rendered and painted white or, according to one source, pale yellow. There are two main storeys; a further smaller storey is recessed on the east (front) side to provide a roof terrace. The roof has a parapet, and originally had a roof garden.

The east face is the entrance front, and is organised symmetrically around a central entrance, flanked by long narrow windows. On the ground floor, these are organised in two sets per side, each having five lights, which are of unequal sizes. On the first floor, there are five sets in total, alternating five lights and two lights. The third storey (recessed on this face) has two windows. The west face reaches three storeys in the centre, with a central entrance and only small windows on the ground floor. The fenestration on the first floor is similar to that of the front face, and the third storey has three small windows. Many of the windows retained their metal casements at the time of designation.

On the interior, the entrance hall is located in the middle of the house, with a concrete staircase faced with black Minton tiles and with an unpierced balustrade. The original layout had three sitting rooms, six bedrooms and two bathrooms. The first floor featured eucalyptus wood. The original design was heated by central-heating panels, in addition to fireplaces, plentiful electrical sockets were supplied, and all of the bedrooms had fitted wardrobes and plumbed-in wash basins.

== Reception ==
A contemporary report in The Times describes the house as lacking "ornamental excrescences" to "impair the rectangularity of a long, low elevation" interrupted only by windows, and goes on to characterise the building as "an object-lesson in a new form of house", which forms a "vivid contrast to the historic and conventional styles of architecture of which Cambridge is so rich." This article praises the convenience of the design and speculates that it would prove relatively cheap to maintain. Another contemporary Times report notes that the house is competitive in price with traditional designs. It was documented in a 1932 article in The Listener by the Cambridge architect H. C. Hughes, who characterises it as "in the high Corbusier manner"; he describes it as "set about with trees whose forms pattern its plain surface with their shadows in the winter and shield its long glass windows from the summer heat".

Bradley and Pevsner describe the White House in 2014 as having "all the requisites – but lifeless". The architectural photographer Tim Rawle describes it as "very simple, black and white 'prisme pure'" (1993).

== See also ==
- Listed buildings in Cambridge (outside the centre)
