= Wilberforce Road =

Street in Cambridge, England

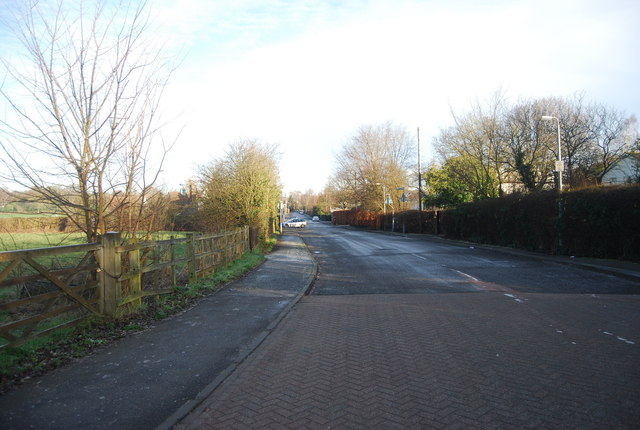
Wilberforce Road: south end

Wilberforce Road is a street in the western outskirts of Cambridge, England, which runs north–south for 550 metres, connecting Madingley Road with Adams Road, which runs eastwards to Grange Road. The road was built in 1933, although several of its buildings date from earlier in the 20th century. It was named after William Wilberforce, the anti-slavery campaigner. Wilberforce Road falls within the conservation area of West Cambridge. As of 2022, the usage is a mix of private housing and buildings and sports facilities associated with the university and colleges, including the Centre for Mathematical Sciences. There are two listed buildings, Emmanuel College's sports pavilion (1910) and the Modernist-style number 9 (1936–37).

== History ==
A drift existed on the route, which connected St John's Grange Farm to Madingley Road, and a handful of agricultural cottages (dating from 1905) and bungalows (1926) pre-date the road construction. The local historian Philomena Guillebaud notes that the bungalows are the only working-class housing to be built on land belonging to St John's College in west Cambridge, other than those housing the college's own agricultural workers. St John's College sold 10 acres (4.0 ha) of land now lying on the west of the road to Emmanuel College in 1907 for sports grounds, and a sports pavilion and adjoining groundsman's house and stable were constructed in 1910 for Emmanuel.

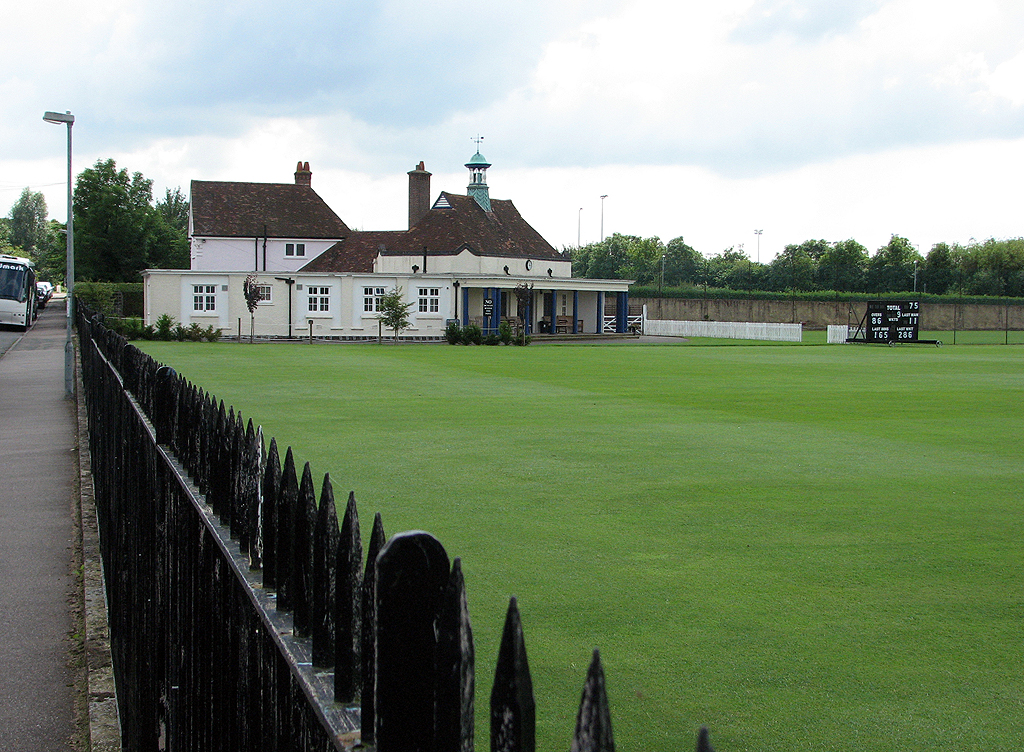
Emmanuel College Sports Pavilion

Wilberforce Road was constructed in 1933 by the borough council, funded by St John's College, which owned the land and wished to develop it, with contribution from Emmanuel College. It was named after William Wilberforce, a student at John's, to mark the centenary of the abolition of slavery across the British Empire. It is connected to Grange Road, which runs broadly parallel to the east, by Clarkson Road, built at the same time, and Adams Road (1898). St John's College leased building plots of 0.5 acres (0.20 ha) for 99 years on both Wilberforce and Clarkson Roads, with 17 plots having been taken up on the two streets by 1939.

After the Second World War, a row of maisonettes was built at the northern end, on the west side, and a larger private residential development occurred at the southern end on the east side, also on Adams Road. In 1989, the university tried to build an athletics centre on a 20-acre (8.1 ha) site off the road's southern end, but failed to gain planning permission; the plans were reduced to a pavilion and running track, which was started in 1993. Plans were initiated in 1997 to move the university's mathematical departments to a site off Wilberforce and Clarkson Roads, adjacent to the existing Isaac Newton Institute. The original plans for three-storey buildings met with opposition from residents, and a new plans for partially underground buildings were substituted. Construction commenced in 1998, and the Centre for Mathematical Sciences was completed in around 2002.

== Buildings and features ==
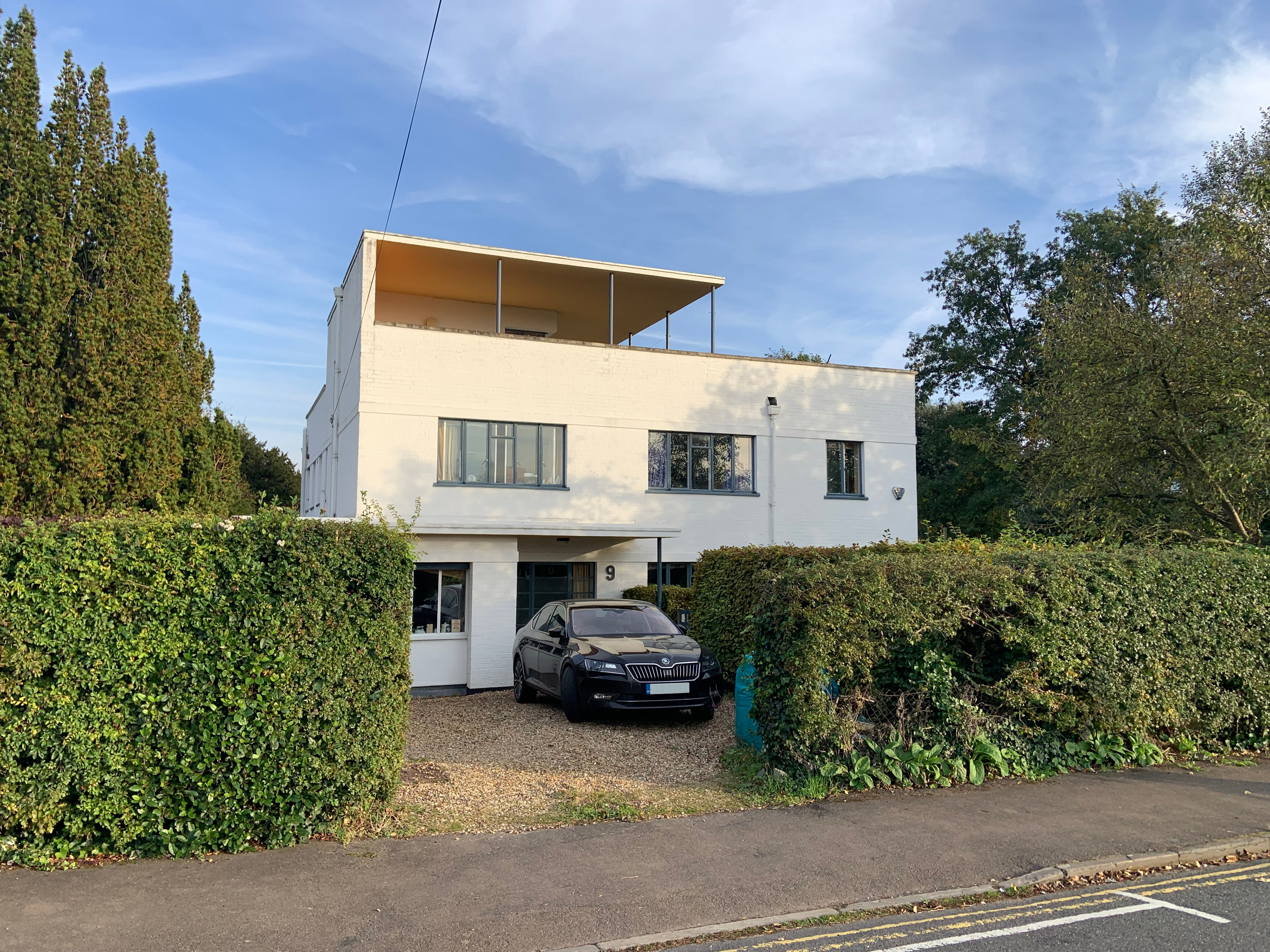
9 Wilberforce Road (1936–1937), one of several Modernist houses locally

Wilberforce Road falls within the West Cambridge Conservation Area. Among the buildings that pre-date the road itself, the most notable is Emmanuel College's sports pavilion with its adjoining groundsman's house and stable (now number 38), completed in 1910. It was designed by the London architects Reginald Francis Wheatly and Edward Ford Duncanson, and is listed at grade II, as a rare example of a surviving Edwardian sports pavilion complete with ancillary buildings. The listing notes that its "complex roofscape of steep, sweeping pitches" lend it a "picturesque character".

The road contains two of the eleven surviving Modernist-style buildings to be built in Cambridge during the 1930s. The grade-II-listed number 9, by Dora Cosens for the zoologist William Homan Thorpe (1936–1937), is constructed in rendered brick on a square plan. The concrete roof has a roof canopy. Number 19 by H. C. Hughes was built for the historian Zachary N. Brooke (1933–1934), but is considerably altered from its original state. Additionally 31 Madingley Road, a grade-II-listed Modernist red-brick house by Marshall Sisson (1931–1932), stands on the east side of the junction. (Another cluster of pre-war Modernist houses is located on nearby Conduit Head Road, on the north side of Madingley Road.) In the interwar period substantial traditional-style houses such as number 7 (1937–1938) were also built on Wilberforce Road. Number 11 (1950–1951) was one of the first post-war Modernist buildings in Cambridge, and number 1 was built in 1965 by the architect John Youngman for himself.

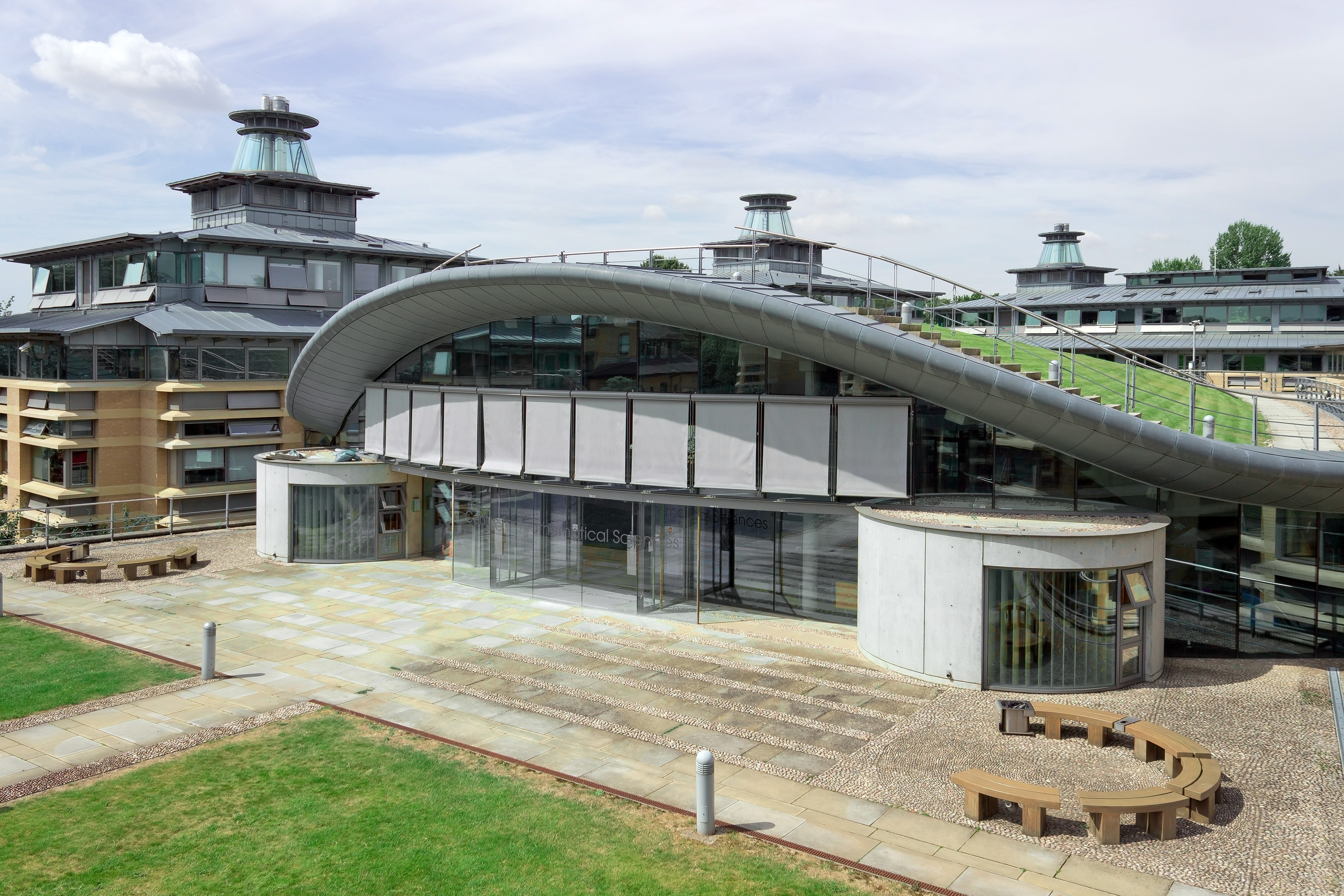
Centre for Mathematical Sciences

University facilities include the Centre for Mathematical Sciences on the east side, built to an unusual design by Ted Cullinan. It features a central hub building with a series of six individual pavilions. In The Buildings of England series, Simon Bradley describes it as among Cullinan's best work, "at once wildly imaginative and tightly disciplined", and compares the pavilions to pagodas or stupas. The Cambridge University Athletics Sportsground is off the south end of Wilberforce Road, and Emmanuel College's Sports Ground lies on the south-west side, with the Cambridge Lawn Tennis Club adjacent, on Stacey's Lane.

The Adams Road Bird Sanctuary, a local wildlife sanctuary with an artificial lake and woodland, lies between Wilberforce Road and Grange Road, and can be seen from Wilberforce Road. The lake is fed by damming Coton Stream, a tributary of Bin Brook, which continues westwards to reach Wilberforce Road, turns north to run alongside the road for around half its length, and then crosses the road and flows westwards. The southern end of Wilberforce Road links to the Coton Footpath, a joint cycle path and footpath, which runs westwards to the village of Coton.

== See also ==
- Listed buildings in Cambridge (west), with two buildings on Wilberforce Road
