= Henry Castree Hughes =

British architect (1893–1976)

Henry Castree "Hugh" Hughes

Henry Castree Hughes (29 May 1893 – 1 January 1976), known as H. C. Hughes or Hugh Hughes, was a British architect and conservationist. He spent his entire career in Cambridge, where he practised architecture from 1923, latterly as Hughes and Bicknell with Peter Bicknell, and lectured in design at the School of Architecture of the University of Cambridge (1919–32). As an architect, he is best known for his Modernist buildings of the 1930s, particularly the Mond Building (1931–32) and Fen Court, Peterhouse (1939–40), although much of his output was traditional in style. He also carried out restoration work on cottages, Cambridge college buildings, and churches, including the Lady Chapel of Ely Cathedral. He was an elected fellow of the Royal Institute of British Architects.

He lobbied on issues relating to the conservation of the countryside surrounding Cambridge, and was instrumental in the foundation of the Cambridge Preservation Society in 1928.

== Early life and education ==
Henry Castree (Note: Also occasionally spelled Castrie) Hughes was born on 29 May 1893 to William Hughes, who served as Chief Secretary for Irrigation in Madras, India. He was educated at Sherborne School (1907–11) and then went up to Peterhouse, Cambridge, where in 1913 he became one of the earliest students at the University of Cambridge's School of Architecture, graduating in 1914. His tutors included Edward Prior, Charles Waldstein and D. H. S. Cranage.

During the First World War, he joined the Royal Artillery and served with Anglo-Indian forces in India and Iraq, where he kept a journal, and in France, where he was wounded.

== Architectural work ==
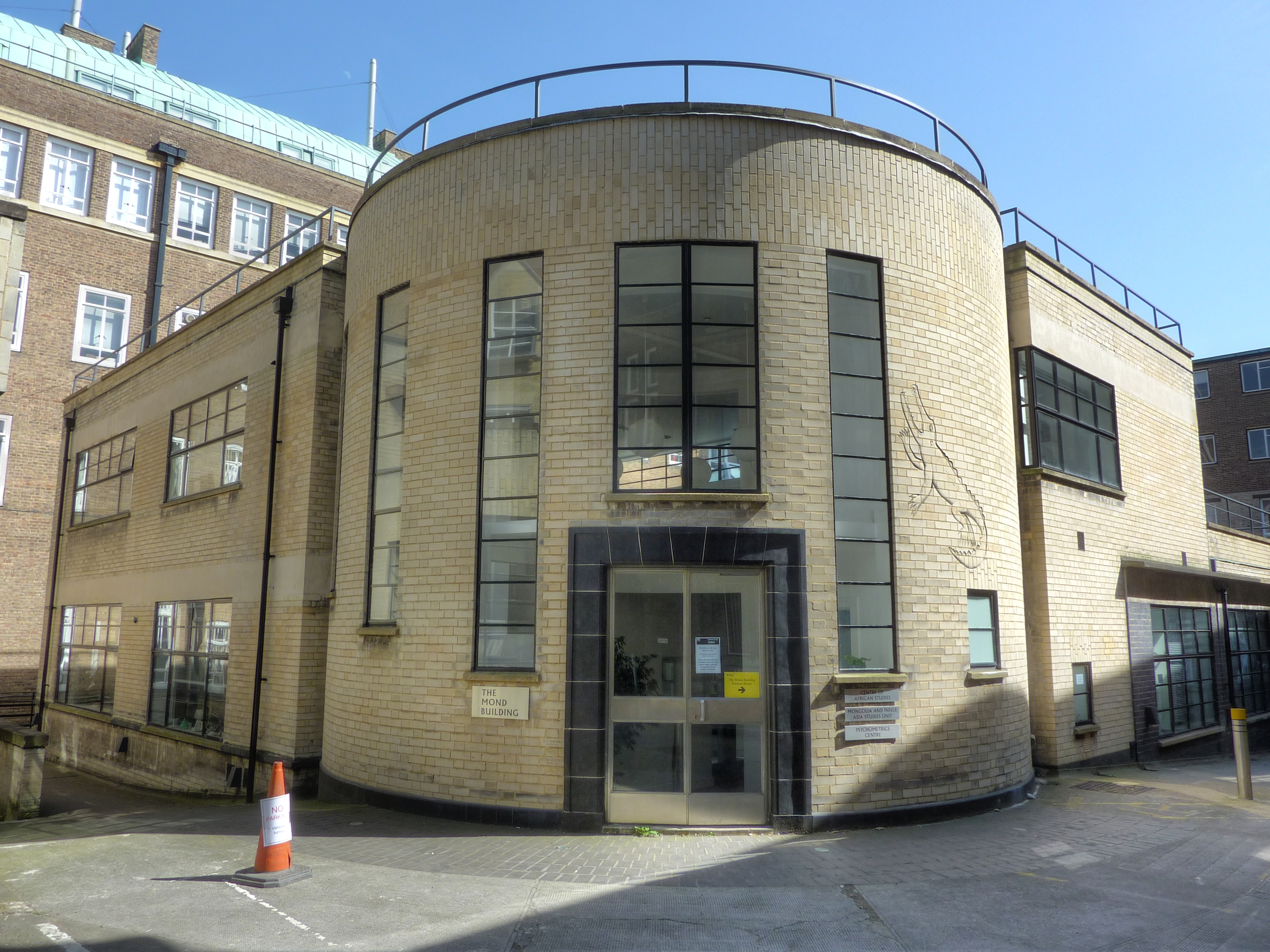
Mond Building (1931–32), the first Modernist university building in Cambridge

After the war, Hughes joined the Cambridge School of Architecture to lecture in design (1919–32), under T. H. Lyon. He worked as an architect in the office of T. D. Atkinson and later in that of Lyon. In 1923, he established his own architectural practice in Cambridge, with offices at Tunwell's Court, off Trumpington Street. Much of his business was designing private houses and conservation projects. Peter Bicknell later joined the practice, becoming a partner in 1936, under the name Hughes and Bicknell. Hughes continued his work at the practice until around 1975.

Some of Hughes's work during the 1930s was Modernist in design; these buildings are described in his obituary in The Times as "outstanding for their simple modernity", and include his best-known works, the Mond Building on the New Museums Site (1931–32) and Fen Court, Peterhouse (1939–40; with Bicknell). The Mond Building, a white-brick laboratory featuring a rotunda decorated with a carved crocodile by Eric Gill, together with its adjacent workshop (also by Hughes), are the earliest university buildings in Cambridge designed in the Modernist style. Fen Court, Peterhouse, is described in its grade II listing as "the only pre-war Cambridge college accommodation building in the International Modern style and the forerunner to other college buildings constructed at both Oxford and Cambridge after the war".

Although Hughes designed no other works for the colleges, one of his Modernist private houses (Postan, 2 Sylvester Road; 1939), was subsumed into Robinson College. Two further private houses from this period are also Modernist in style: 19 Wilberforce Road (1933–34), described in Bradley and Pevsner as "rather heavily done", and the grade-II-listed Brandon Hill (now Salix) on Conduit Head Road (1933–34), an L-shaped building with corner windows and a roof terrace, designed for the Australian physicist Mark Oliphant. Along with examples from this decade by George Checkley, Marshall Sisson, Justin Blanco White and others, they number among the earliest Modernist houses in Cambridge.

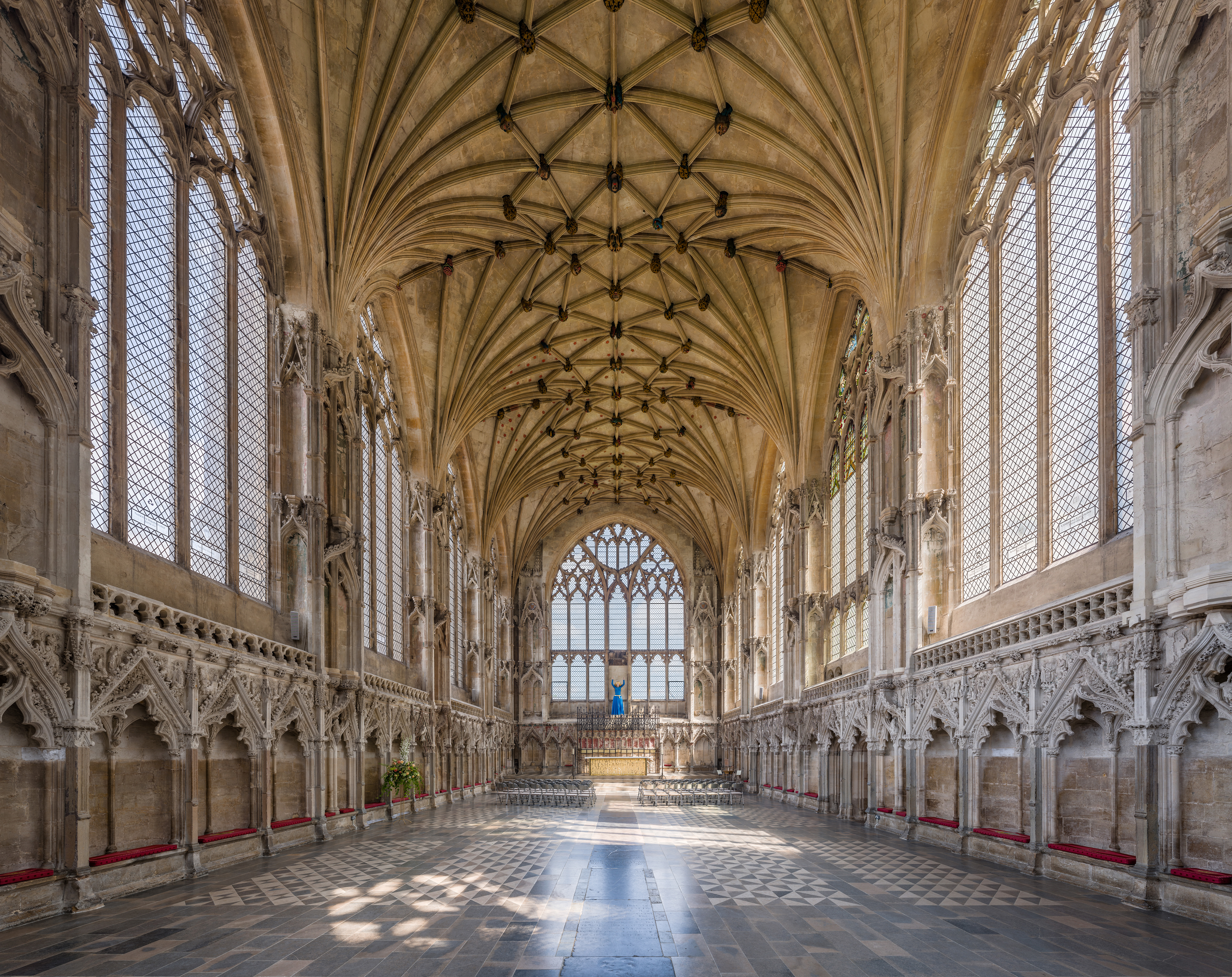
Lady Chapel, Ely Cathedral, restored by Hughes

Many of Hughes's houses were in a vernacular style. They were influenced by the Arts and Crafts movement but unusually incorporated modern materials such as concrete. Examples in Cambridge include 102 Long Road (c. 1936), which reuses the timber frame from a Tudor building on Market Hill; 173 Huntingdon Road (1930), a "quirky" house with a prominent staircase window built for the Russian physicist Peter Kapitza; and a house with Italianate decoration on Buckingham Road (c. 1933), later adapted to form part of the Blackfriars Dominican Priory. Hughes also designed seven or more houses in the nearby village of Grantchester, including Manor Field and Orion.

In addition to new buildings, Hughes restored many churches, most notably the Lady Chapel of Ely Cathedral, as well as St Andrew the Less, Market Road, Cambridge (1923–25), and numerous Cambridgeshire parish churches including those of Shepreth (1922–23), Balsham, Barton, Kingston, Little Eversden, Great Eversden, Harlton and Grantchester. He extended the Local Examinations Syndicate building on Mill Lane (1930), and undertook considerable renovation work for the Cambridge colleges. Outside Cambridge, he restored and extended the 17th-century Thriplow Place (The Bury) in the village of Thriplow (1930). He also restored cottages, mainly in Grantchester and Abington, such as Wright's Row, 2–10 High Street, Grantchester (1939), the earliest project of the Cambridgeshire Cottage Improvement Society.

Hughes had a lifelong interest in windmills, which led him to survey and photograph these structures across Cambridgeshire and the Isle of Ely with J. H. Bullock in 1930–31; his photographs are archived by the Cambridge Antiquarian Society. He also surveyed interwar buildings in Cambridge for The Builder in 1933, and wrote on vernacular buildings and the landscape designer, Humphry Repton.

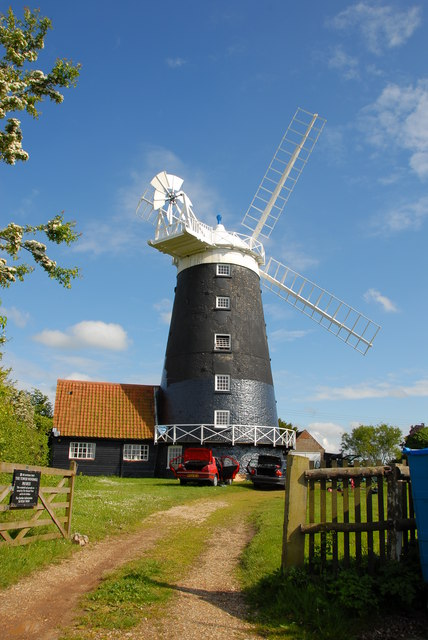
Overy Staithe windmill, saved by Hughes and donated to the National Trust

He was an elected fellow of the Royal Institute of British Architects. He served as president of the Essex, Cambridge and Hertfordshire Society of Architects in 1932, and chaired the Cambridgeshire Cottage Improvement Society (1954–67).

== Countryside conservation ==
In the 1920s, Hughes lobbied with some success for a planning strategy to be established for the area surrounding Cambridge. In 1924, he was the university representative on the Cambridgeshire Rural Community Council. Together with Hugh Durnford, the bursar of King's College, Hughes was instrumental in the foundation of the Cambridge Preservation Society in 1928, and served jointly with Durnford as its first secretary in 1928–32. Drawing on the example of the earlier Oxford Preservation Trust, the society in its early years aimed to block industrial development in Cambridge, to hinder ribbon housing development in the surrounding countryside, and to prevent the construction of new roads to create a ring road. According to Anthony J. Cooper, the society's efforts were a significant factor in the establishment of the Cambridge Green Belt around the city in 1955. Hughes was also honorary secretary of the Cambridgeshire Council for the Preservation of Rural England from 1945.

In the 1920s, he purchased the defunct 1816 windmill at Overy Staithe in Norfolk to save it from demolition, and donated it to the National Trust in 1958, which has since used it for holiday accommodation. It is now listed at grade II*, denoting "particularly important buildings of more than special interest".

== Personal life ==
Hughes was married twice. In 1921, he married Mary; she died after a prolonged illness in 1964. He married Gwendolyn née Rendle, known as "Gwendle" (1900–83), a jewellery maker and a director of Primavera, in December 1964. The family lived at Garner Cottage, Mill Way, in the village of Grantchester, just outside Cambridge. He spent time in Sweden and the Netherlands.

He died on 1 January 1976, at the age of 82. He is buried in the churchyard in Grantchester.

== References and notes ==
- Simon Bradley, Nikolaus Pevsner. Cambridgeshire (The Buildings of England series) (Yale University Press; 2014) ISBN 978-0-300-20596-1
