= Listed buildings in Cambridge (outside the centre) =

Non-Civil Parish in Cambridgeshire, England

Cambridge is a city and non-metropolitan district in the county of Cambridgeshire, England It contains 838 listed buildings that are recorded in the National Heritage List for England. Of these 67 are grade I, 54 are grade II* and 717 are grade II.

This list is based on the information retrieved online from Historic England. The quantity of listed buildings in Cambridge requires subdivision into geographically defined lists. This list includes all listed buildings located outside the city center.

== Key ==
Grade	Criteria
I	Buildings that are of exceptional interest
II*	Particularly important buildings of more than special interest
II	Buildings that are of special interest

== Listing ==
=== Outside the centre ===
Name	Grade	Location	Type	Completed (Note: The date given is the date used by Historic England as significant for the initial building or that of an important part in the structure's description.)	Date designated	Grid ref. (Note: The grid reference is based on the British national grid reference system, sometimes known as OSGB36, used by the Ordnance Survey.) Geo-coordinates	Notes	Entry number (Note: The "List Entry Number" is a unique number assigned to each listed building and scheduled monument by Historic England.)	Image	Wikidata
The Stone House and Associated Gate Piers	II	3 Madingley Road, CB3 0EE			22 December 2014	TL4414159031; 52°12′38″N 0°06′29″E		1422019	Upload Photo	Q26676917
Cambridge City Branch Library	II	Mill Road			2 November 1972	TL4635157827; 52°11′57″N 0°08′24″E		1126141	Upload Photo	Q26419122
Clare College Boathouse	II		boathouse		2 August 1996	TL4586359085; 52°12′38″N 0°08′00″E		1268361	Clare College Boathouse More images	Q26558673
Elterholm, 12 and 12a Madingley Road	II	12 and 12a Madingley Road, CB3 0EE			22 December 2014	TL4408659212; 52°12′44″N 0°06′27″E		1422165	Upload Photo	Q26676930
29 Storey's Way	II	29 Storey's Way, CB3 0DP			18 May 1967	TL4361359571; 52°12′56″N 0°06′02″E		1331882	Upload Photo	Q26616741
30 Storey's Way	II	30 Storeys Way, CB3 0DT			18 May 1967	TL4355059609; 52°12′58″N 0°05′59″E		1343647	Upload Photo	Q26627430
48 Storey's Way	II*	48 Storey's Way	building		18 May 1967	TL4357259503; 52°12′54″N 0°06′00″E		1126090	48 Storey's Way More images	Q26263434
Elmside Including Boundary Wall and Gate	II	49 Grange Road, CB3 9BN			2 August 1996	TL4395658303; 52°12′15″N 0°06′19″E		1268365	Upload Photo	Q26558676
Silbury Including Gate Piers and Plinth Wall	II	60 Grange Road, CB3 9DH			2 August 1996	TL4402558616; 52°12′25″N 0°06′23″E		1268366	Upload Photo	Q26558677
Whewell House, Including Boundary Walls to South and West	II	62 Grange Road, CB3 9DH			2 August 1996	TL4402858650; 52°12′26″N 0°06′23″E		1268367	Upload Photo	Q26558678
76 Storey's Way	II	76 Storey's Way			2 August 1996	TL4388059344; 52°12′49″N 0°06′16″E		1268347	Upload Photo	Q26558661
The David Parr House	II*	186 Gwydir Street, CB1 2LW	museum		4 August 2020	TL4626457917; 52°12′00″N 0°08′20″E		1470294	The David Parr House More images	Q98176133
214 Chesterton Road	II	214 Chesterton Road, CB4 1NE			3 July 2012	TL4610559730; 52°12′59″N 0°08′14″E		1408395	Upload Photo	Q26676001
C.u.b.c. Goldie Boathouse	II		boathouse		2 August 1996	TL4568659133; 52°12′40″N 0°07′51″E		1268360	C.u.b.c. Goldie Boathouse More images	Q5580180
Cherry Hinton Hall	II		house		19 September 2002	TL4814656434; 52°11′11″N 0°09′56″E		1031881	Cherry Hinton Hall More images	Q5092398
Entrance Gateway to the Botanic Gardens Gateway and Screen to the Botanic Garden Facing Trumpington Road	II				2 November 1972	TL4525657135; 52°11′36″N 0°07′25″E		1067731	Upload Photo	Q26320528
Entrance Gateway to the University Library Entrance Gateway to the University Library Onto Burrell's Walk	II				2 November 1972	TL4419458481; 52°12′21″N 0°06′31″E		1338190	Upload Photo	Q26622537
Lodge of Cambridge General Cemetery	II				2 November 1972	TL4432659642; 52°12′58″N 0°06′40″E		1126200	Upload Photo	Q26419176
Pembroke College Boathouse	II		boathouse		2 August 1996	TL4589559085; 52°12′38″N 0°08′02″E		1268362	Pembroke College Boathouse More images	Q26558674
The Lodge and Gatepiers and Gates at Cherry Hinton Hall	II				19 September 2002	TL4796356335; 52°11′08″N 0°09′46″E		1031882	Upload Photo	Q26283273
Tomb of James Reynolds at Mill Road Cemetery	II		tomb		8 May 2000	TL4619758322; 52°12′13″N 0°08′17″E		1380303	Tomb of James Reynolds at Mill Road Cemetery More images	Q26660511
Abbey House	II	Abbey Road	house		26 April 1950	TL4621658920; 52°12′33″N 0°08′19″E		1331811	Abbey House More images	Q21061944
Archway at Abbey House and to the West of It	II	Abbey Road			2 November 1972	TL4620758900; 52°12′32″N 0°08′18″E		1126283	Upload Photo	Q26419249
Wall at Abbey House Fronting Abbey Road and Beche Road	II	Abbey Road			2 November 1972	TL4618958932; 52°12′33″N 0°08′17″E		1338182	Upload Photo	Q26622530
Wall at Rear of Abbey House	II	Abbey Road			2 November 1972	TL4623558930; 52°12′33″N 0°08′20″E		1122667	Upload Photo	Q26415784
Applecourt, Garages to the North and Mushroom Lights in the Grounds	II	Applecourt, Garages To The North And Mushroom Lights In The Grounds, Newton Road, CB2 8AN			2 July 2024	TL4536756787; 52°11′25″N 0°07′31″E		1490938	Upload Photo	Q131199776
Roger Ascham School Classrooms 1, 2 and 3	II	2 and 3, Ascham Road			13 August 1992	TL4542960059; 52°13′10″N 0°07′39″E		1265262	Upload Photo	Q26555869
Roger Ascham School Administration Building and Hall	II	Ascham Road			13 August 1992	TL4543660024; 52°13′09″N 0°07′39″E		1331937	Upload Photo	Q26616789
Roger Ascham School Double Classroom	II	Ascham Road			13 August 1992	TL4547660006; 52°13′09″N 0°07′41″E		1126001	Upload Photo	Q26418989
Roger Ascham School Gymnasium and Attached Classroom	II	Ascham Road			13 August 1992	TL4545660067; 52°13′11″N 0°07′40″E		1331961	Upload Photo	Q26616813
78, Barton Road	II	78, Barton Road			2 November 1972	TL4361057610; 52°11′53″N 0°05′59″E		1126245	Upload Photo	Q26419220
Gateway at Number 78	II	Barton Road			2 November 1972	TL4361057579; 52°11′52″N 0°05′59″E		1126246	Upload Photo	Q26419221
Newnham War Memorial	II	Barton Road, Newnham	war memorial		16 December 2015	TL4418957460; 52°11′47″N 0°06′30″E		1430662	Newnham War Memorial More images	Q26677616
1-5, Bell's Court (see Details for Further Address Information)	II	1-5, Bell's Court			2 November 1972	TL4448859167; 52°12′42″N 0°06′48″E		1111891	Upload Photo	Q26405706
Trumpington Road (see Details for Further Address Information)	II	1-5, Belvoir Terrace			2 November 1972	TL4515357223; 52°11′39″N 0°07′20″E		1356571	Upload Photo	Q26639213
Cory Lodge Cory Lodge, Botanic Garden	II	Botanic Gardens			18 May 1967	TL4559757194; 52°11′38″N 0°07′43″E		1126273	Upload Photo	Q26419244
Wolfson Hall, Bracken Library and Bevin Rooms Churchill College	II	Bracken Library And Bevin Rooms Churchill College, Storeys Way			30 March 1993	TL4374259225; 52°12′45″N 0°06′09″E		1126008	Upload Photo	Q26418996
Brooklands	II	24, Brooklands Avenue			2 November 1972	TL4548256908; 52°11′28″N 0°07′37″E		1126232	Upload Photo	Q26419207
Regional Seat of Government	II	Brooklands Avenue			18 July 2003	TL4554656519; 52°11′16″N 0°07′40″E		1390525	Upload Photo	Q114863204
1, Brookside	II	1, Brookside			2 November 1972	TL4521557310; 52°11′42″N 0°07′23″E		1331836	Upload Photo	Q26616701
Telephone Kiosk by Bridge	II	Brookside			11 February 1988	TL4517157533; 52°11′49″N 0°07′21″E		1126033	Upload Photo	Q26419019
Faculty of Economics and Politics, Cambridge University	II	Cambridge University, Sidgwick Avenue			30 March 1993	TL4419057971; 52°12′04″N 0°06′30″E		1227655	Upload Photo	Q26521553
Lady Mitchell Hall, Cambridge University	II	Cambridge University, Sidwick Avenue			30 March 1993	TL4422957930; 52°12′03″N 0°06′32″E		1331923	Upload Photo	Q6470457
Little Hall and Attached Lecture Theatre Block, Cambridge University	II	Cambridge University, Sidgwick Avenue			30 March 1993	TL4428357948; 52°12′03″N 0°06′35″E		1126005	Upload Photo	Q26418993
Raised Faculty Block, Cambridge University	II	Cambridge University, Sidgwick Avenue			30 March 1993	TL4426657986; 52°12′04″N 0°06′34″E		1126006	Upload Photo	Q26418994
County Folk Museum	II	2, Castle Street			2 November 1972	TL4458459057; 52°12′39″N 0°06′53″E		1331827	Upload Photo	Q99937412
The Castle Inn	II	36, Castle Street	pub		2 November 1972	TL4450459186; 52°12′43″N 0°06′49″E		1111867	The Castle Inn More images	Q26405672
55-69, Castle Street	II	55-69, Castle Street			2 November 1972	TL4444559261; 52°12′46″N 0°06′46″E		1336945	Upload Photo	Q26621408
83, Castle Street	II	83, Castle Street			2 November 1972	TL4441359293; 52°12′47″N 0°06′44″E		1126234	Upload Photo	Q26419210
Caretaker's House in the Grounds of County Hall and About Fifty Yards to the South	II	Castle Street			2 November 1972	TL4451859203; 52°12′44″N 0°06′50″E		1126235	Upload Photo	Q26419211
Castle Street Methodist Church and Sunday School Including Front Gates and Railings	II	Castle Street	building		1 May 2003	TL4451059126; 52°12′41″N 0°06′49″E		1096102	Castle Street Methodist Church and Sunday School Including Front Gates and Railings More images	Q48807079
Church of St Giles	II*	Castle Street	church building		26 April 1950	TL4460059110; 52°12′40″N 0°06′54″E		1331828	Church of St Giles More images	Q17543334
Kettles Yard	II	Castle Street, CB3 0AQ			2 November 1972	TL4453859071; 52°12′39″N 0°06′50″E		1126115	Upload Photo	Q26419096
Social Service Department	II	Castle Street			2 November 1972	TL4446559280; 52°12′46″N 0°06′47″E		1336970	Upload Photo	Q26621431
St Giles' War Memorial	II	Castle Street, CB3 0AQ	war memorial		6 October 2015	TL4461259075; 52°12′39″N 0°06′54″E		1428626	St Giles' War Memorial More images	Q26677466
Fitzwilliam College, Central Hall Building	II	Central Hall Building, Storeys Way, CB3 0DG			19 June 2024	TL4396959562; 52°12′56″N 0°06′21″E		1489400	Upload Photo	Q136357707
Fitzwilliam College, Chapel	II	Chapel, Storeys Way, CB3 0DG			19 June 2024	TL4393959516; 52°12′54″N 0°06′20″E		1489402	Upload Photo	Q136357708
1, Chapel Street	II	1, Chapel Street, Chesterton			2 November 1972	TL4630159861; 52°13′03″N 0°08′24″E		1126236	Upload Photo	Q26419212
5, Chapel Street	II	5, Chapel Street, Chesterton			2 November 1972	TL4633459807; 52°13′01″N 0°08′26″E		1111881	Upload Photo	Q26405694
Chesterton Tower	I	Chapel Street, Chesterton	tower		26 April 1950	TL4629459804; 52°13′01″N 0°08′24″E		1331829	Chesterton Tower More images	Q17527465
Springfield	II	Cherry Hinton Road, Chesterton			2 November 1972	TL4844556258; 52°11′05″N 0°10′12″E		1126237	Upload Photo	Q26419213
Church of St George	II	Chesterfield Road	church building		12 February 1999	TL4643860610; 52°13′27″N 0°08′33″E		1245573	Church of St George More images	Q26538090
Castle Brae	II	5, Chesterton Lane			2 November 1972	TL4462159176; 52°12′43″N 0°06′55″E		1111884	Upload Photo	Q26405698
Wentworth House	II	2, Chesterton Road			26 April 1950	TL4475959183; 52°12′43″N 0°07′02″E		1331830	Upload Photo	Q26616695
4-10, Chesterton Road	II	4-10, Chesterton Road			2 November 1972	TL4478459196; 52°12′43″N 0°07′04″E		1126238	Upload Photo	Q26419214
Chesterton Hall	II	Chesterton Road	historic house		26 April 1950	TL4597559723; 52°12′59″N 0°08′07″E		1126239	Chesterton Hall More images	Q5093861
67, Church End	II	67, Church End, Cherry Hinton			2 November 1972	TL4869557572; 52°11′47″N 0°10′27″E		1331831	Upload Photo	Q26616696
Mafeking Cottage	II	125, Church End, Cherry Hinton			2 November 1972	TL4886857510; 52°11′45″N 0°10′36″E		1111856	Upload Photo	Q26405657
Uphall	II	210, Church End, Cherry Hinton			2 November 1972	TL4897657274; 52°11′37″N 0°10′41″E		1126240	Upload Photo	Q26419215
The School House	II	21, Church Lane, Trumpington			2 November 1972	TL4439054979; 52°10′27″N 0°06′36″E		1126241	Upload Photo	Q26419216
The Old House	II*	Church Lane, Trumpington	house		26 April 1950	TL4442354969; 52°10′27″N 0°06′38″E		1111864	The Old House More images	Q17543214
Trumpington Hall	II	Church Lane, Trumpington			26 April 1950	TL4409755122; 52°10′32″N 0°06′21″E		1111859	Upload Photo	Q26405661
The Elms Westcroft	II	14, Church Street, Chesterton			2 November 1972	TL4634459815; 52°13′02″N 0°08′27″E		1126209	Upload Photo	Q26419184
22, Church Street	II	22, Church Street, Chesterton			2 November 1972	TL4638059854; 52°13′03″N 0°08′29″E		1126210	Upload Photo	Q26419185
Chesterton House	II	Church Street, Chesterton			2 November 1972	TL4615359744; 52°13′00″N 0°08′17″E		1322398	Upload Photo	Q26608210
Church of St Andrew	I	Church Street, Chesterton	church building		26 April 1950	TL4627959623; 52°12′55″N 0°08′23″E		1112541	Church of St Andrew More images	Q17527300
Churchyard and Wall of the Church of St Andrew	II	Church Street, Chesterton			2 November 1972	TL4630559641; 52°12′56″N 0°08′24″E		1126242	Upload Photo	Q26419217
Pigeon House in Garden of Chesterton House	II	Church Street, Chesterton			2 November 1972	TL4616459720; 52°12′59″N 0°08′17″E		1331833	Upload Photo	Q26616698
The Vicarage	II	Church Street, Chesterton			2 November 1972	TL4629059731; 52°12′59″N 0°08′24″E		1126208	Upload Photo	Q26419183
Chapel, Churchill College	II	Churchill College, Storeys Way			30 March 1993	TL4336459402; 52°12′51″N 0°05′49″E		1331925	Upload Photo	Q26616778
Research Flats, Churchill College	II	Churchill College, Storeys Way			30 March 1993	TL4342659444; 52°12′52″N 0°05′52″E		1331924	Upload Photo	Q26616777
Gas Lamp Post Outside Number 5	II	Clare Road			7 September 2010	TL4419957618; 52°11′53″N 0°06′30″E		1393950	Upload Photo	Q26673084
3, Clarkson Road	II	3, Clarkson Road			23 April 2004	TL4386858809; 52°12′31″N 0°06′15″E		1390957	Upload Photo	Q26670331
Newnham College, Clough Hall	II*	Clough Hall, Newnham College			18 May 1967	TL4407757862; 52°12′01″N 0°06′24″E		1186757	Upload Photo	Q17543297
Salix	II	Conduit Head Road	building		7 September 1992	TL4284359361; 52°12′50″N 0°05′22″E		1227614	Salix More images	Q26521516
Shawms	II*	Conduit Head Road	house		2 August 1996	TL4280659562; 52°12′57″N 0°05′20″E		1268363	Shawms More images	Q17543329
Spring House	II	Conduit Head Road	house		12 April 2000	TL4292259520; 52°12′55″N 0°05′26″E		1380900	Spring House More images	Q26661056
White House	II	Conduit Head Road			7 September 1992	TL4284259307; 52°12′48″N 0°05′22″E		1126037	White House More images	Q26419023
Willow House	II*	Conduit Head Road	house		3 August 1992	TL4286959393; 52°12′51″N 0°05′23″E		1331936	Willow House More images	Q17543363
Corpus Christi and Sidney Sussex Boathouse	II	Cutter Ferry Lane	building		2 December 1997	TL4579859099; 52°12′39″N 0°07′57″E		1021928	Corpus Christi and Sidney Sussex Boathouse More images	Q26272793
The Zion Baptist Church	II	East Road	Protestant church building		3 February 1994	TL4583058290; 52°12′13″N 0°07′57″E		1227719	The Zion Baptist Church More images	Q26521615
Zion Chapel Sunday School (baptist)	II	East Road			2 November 1972	TL4581958272; 52°12′12″N 0°07′57″E		1126211	Upload Photo	Q26419186
Roebuck House	II	22, Ferry Lane, Chesterton			2 November 1972	TL4661359885; 52°13′04″N 0°08′41″E		1331857	Upload Photo	Q26616720
The Old Smithy	II	Forest Road, Cherry Hinton			2 November 1972	TL4855356385; 52°11′09″N 0°10′18″E		1126216	Upload Photo	Q26419191
Windmill at Chesterton Mills	II	French's Road	smock mill		2 November 1972	TL4455859947; 52°13′08″N 0°06′53″E		1337012	Windmill at Chesterton Mills More images	Q26621468
Forecourt Screen, Gatepiers and Gates at Trumpington Hall	II	Gatepiers And Gates At Trumpington Hall, Church Lane, Trumpington			26 April 1950	TL4413355092; 52°10′31″N 0°06′23″E		1331832	Upload Photo	Q26616697
Selwyn College, Gateway and Screen Between the North Range and the Chapel	II	Gateway And Screen Between The North Range And The Chapel, Selwyn College			2 November 1972	TL4406857968; 52°12′04″N 0°06′24″E		1106253	Upload Photo	Q26400131
Corpus Christi College, George Thomson Building, Leckhampton House	II	George Thomson Building, Leckhampton House, Grange Road			30 March 1993	TL4365157973; 52°12′05″N 0°06′02″E		1126003	Upload Photo	Q26418991
Churchyard Wall of the Church of St Mary and St Nicholas	II	Granchester Road, Trumpington			2 November 1972	TL4428354974; 52°10′27″N 0°06′31″E		1126218	Upload Photo	Q26419193
Five Gables	II	4, Grange Road			24 February 1978	TL4397857557; 52°11′51″N 0°06′19″E		1331935	Upload Photo	Q26616788
48, Grange Road	II	48, Grange Road, CB3 9DH			2 August 1996	TL4401558205; 52°12′12″N 0°06′22″E		1268364	Upload Photo	Q26558675
Cambridge University Real Tennis Club and Professionals House	II	Grange Road, CB3 9DJ	sports club		22 December 2014	TL4403558424; 52°12′19″N 0°06′23″E		1422000	Cambridge University Real Tennis Club and Professionals House More images	Q5025611
Robinson College, Cambridge	II*	Grange Road, CB3 9AN	college of the University of Cambridge		10 November 2022	TL4387358353; 52°12′17″N 0°06′14″E		1482703	Robinson College, Cambridge More images	Q1247564
The Vicarage	II	1, Grantchester Road, Trumpington			2 November 1972	TL4431954922; 52°10′25″N 0°06′33″E		1331859	Upload Photo	Q26616722
2 and 2a, Grantchester Road	II	2 and 2a, Grantchester Road			12 April 2000	TL4364457497; 52°11′49″N 0°06′01″E		1392069	Upload Photo	Q26671389
10, 12 and 14, Grantchester Road	II	10, 12 and 14, Grantchester Road, Trumpington, CB2 9LH			2 November 1972	TL4433054972; 52°10′27″N 0°06′33″E		1126220	Upload Photo	Q26419195
16 and 18, Grantchester Road	II	16 and 18, Grantchester Road, Trumpington			2 November 1972	TL4431254983; 52°10′27″N 0°06′32″E		1081504	Upload Photo	Q26356946
20 and 22, Grantchester Road	II	20 and 22, Grantchester Road, Trumpington			2 November 1972	TL4429654981; 52°10′27″N 0°06′31″E		1331861	Upload Photo	Q26616724
Anstey Hall Farmhouse	II	Grantchester Road, Trumpington			2 November 1972	TL4420654947; 52°10′26″N 0°06′27″E		1081493	Upload Photo	Q26356929
Barn at Anstey Hall Farm	II	Grantchester Road, Trumpington			2 November 1972	TL4417654932; 52°10′26″N 0°06′25″E		1081497	Upload Photo	Q26356935
Church of St Mary and St Michael	I	Grantchester Road, Trumpington	church building		26 April 1950	TL4428254951; 52°10′26″N 0°06′31″E		1081526	Church of St Mary and St Michael More images	Q17527263
Dovecote at Anstey Hall Farm	II	Grantchester Road, Trumpington			2 November 1972	TL4416654894; 52°10′25″N 0°06′24″E		1126219	Upload Photo	Q26419194
Garden Wall of Anstey Hall Farmhouse	II	Grantchester Road, Trumpington			2 November 1972	TL4424254962; 52°10′27″N 0°06′29″E		1331860	Upload Photo	Q26616723
Owen Webb House	II	1, Gresham Road			2 November 1972	TL4564457927; 52°12′01″N 0°07′47″E		1126224	Upload Photo	Q26419199
3 and 3a, Gresham Road	II	3 and 3a, Gresham Road			2 November 1972	TL4564757895; 52°12′00″N 0°07′47″E		1349031	Upload Photo	Q26632354
Newnham College, Hall	II	Hall, Newnham College			18 May 1967	TL4412057858; 52°12′00″N 0°06′27″E		1125507	Upload Photo	Q26418512
Milestone About Half A Mile South of the Junction with Shelford Road	II	Hauxton Road, Trumpington	milestone		10 May 1962	TL4420453979; 52°09′55″N 0°06′25″E		1126190	Milestone About Half A Mile South of the Junction with Shelford Road More images	Q26419168
Clare Hall, University of Cambridge	II*	Herschel Road, CB3 9AL			6 September 2018	TL4391158280; 52°12′14″N 0°06′16″E		1454213	Upload Photo	Q66479471
Schlumberger Gould Research Centre and Attached Perimeter Wall to the North	II*	High Cross, Madingley Road, CB3 0EL	building		17 February 2017	TL4233359154; 52°12′44″N 0°04′54″E		1438644	Schlumberger Gould Research Centre and Attached Perimeter Wall to the North More images	Q66478003
The Coach and Horses Public House	II	18 and 20, High Street, Trumpington	pub		2 November 1972	TL4456155279; 52°10′37″N 0°06′46″E		1331848	The Coach and Horses Public House More images	Q26616713
22, High Street	II	22, High Street, Trumpington			2 November 1972	TL4455855243; 52°10′35″N 0°06′46″E		1331849	Upload Photo	Q26616714
24 and 26 High Street	II	24 and 26, High Street, Trumpington			2 November 1972	TL4455855220; 52°10′35″N 0°06′46″E		1126196	Upload Photo	Q26419172
25 and 27, High Street	II	25 and 27, High Street, Chesterton			2 November 1972	TL4614559798; 52°13′01″N 0°08′16″E		1126192	Upload Photo	Q26419169
28 and 30, High Street	II	28 and 30, High Street, Trumpington			2 November 1972	TL4455355172; 52°10′33″N 0°06′45″E		1099182	Upload Photo	Q26391333
50, High Street	II	50, High Street, Cherry Hinton			27 April 1992	TL4865156390; 52°11′09″N 0°10′23″E		1126002	Upload Photo	Q26418990
52, High Street	II	52, High Street, Trumpington			2 November 1972	TL4455454929; 52°10′25″N 0°06′45″E		1099185	Upload Photo	Q26391336
The Green Man Inn	II	55, High Street, Trumpington	inn		29 March 1962	TL4460755241; 52°10′35″N 0°06′48″E		1126195	The Green Man Inn More images	Q26419171
60 and 62, High Street	II	60 and 62, High Street, Trumpington			2 November 1972	TL4455754749; 52°10′19″N 0°06′45″E		1331850	Upload Photo	Q26616715
81, High Street	II	81, High Street, Chesterton			2 November 1972	TL4627359888; 52°13′04″N 0°08′23″E		1331847	Upload Photo	Q26616712
84, High Street	II	84, High Street, Cherry Hinton			16 August 1973	TL4872756492; 52°11′12″N 0°10′27″E		1126028	Upload Photo	Q26419014
Church of St Andrew	I	High Street, Cherry Hinton	church building		26 April 1950	TL4897157096; 52°11′31″N 0°10′41″E		1126191	Church of St Andrew More images	Q17527397
Churchyard Wall of the Church of St Andrew	II	High Street, Cherry Hinton			2 November 1972	TL4899057056; 52°11′30″N 0°10′42″E		1331846	Upload Photo	Q26616711
Milestone About 150 Yards South of Cromwell House	II	High Street, Trumpington	milestone		10 May 1962	TL4467755473; 52°10′43″N 0°06′52″E		1126193	Milestone About 150 Yards South of Cromwell House More images	Q26419170
Keelson	II	8a, Hills Avenue			15 July 1998	TL4654056066; 52°11′00″N 0°08′31″E		1375672	Upload Photo	Q26656432
Wanstead House	II*	2, Hills Road	house		26 April 1950	TL4553657679; 52°11′53″N 0°07′41″E		1099114	Wanstead House More images	Q17543208
4 and 6, Hills Road	II	4 and 6, Hills Road			22 January 1975	TL4554757664; 52°11′53″N 0°07′41″E		1331934	Upload Photo	Q26616787
8 and 10, Hills Road	II	8 and 10, Hills Road			2 November 1972	TL4555557654; 52°11′52″N 0°07′42″E		1331851	Upload Photo	Q26616716
12-18, Hills Road	II	12-18, Hills Road			22 January 1975	TL4556457636; 52°11′52″N 0°07′42″E		1126029	Upload Photo	Q26419015
20 and 22, Hills Road	II	20 and 22, Hills Road			2 November 1972	TL4557757619; 52°11′51″N 0°07′43″E		1126199	Upload Photo	Q26419175
Highsett and Front Retaining Wall	II	1a-37, Hills Road	housing development		22 December 1998	TL4575557439; 52°11′45″N 0°07′52″E		1246829	Highsett and Front Retaining Wall More images	Q24705038
Homerton College Trumpington House	II	178, Hills Road			2 November 1972	TL4613056454; 52°11′13″N 0°08′10″E		1331852	Upload Photo	Q26616717
Church of St Paul	II	Hills Road	church building		2 November 1972	TL4563657620; 52°11′51″N 0°07′46″E		1349075	Church of St Paul More images	Q26632397
Gymnasium and Art and Craft Studios Adjoining West of Homerton College	II	Hills Road			30 September 1992	TL4605156330; 52°11′09″N 0°08′06″E		1126038	Upload Photo	Q26419024
Milestone Outside 100 Hills Road	II	Hills Road	milestone		9 August 2006	TL4575557324; 52°11′42″N 0°07′52″E		1391728	Milestone Outside 100 Hills Road More images	Q26671081
Rectory of the Church of Our Lady and the English Martyrs (roman Catholic)	II	Hills Road			2 November 1972	TL4549057702; 52°11′54″N 0°07′38″E		1349043	Upload Photo	Q26632367
Wall and Gatepiers of the Rectory	II	Hills Road			2 November 1972	TL4552457723; 52°11′55″N 0°07′40″E		1126198	Upload Photo	Q26419174
Wall and Gates of the Church of Our Lady and the English Martyrs (roman Catholic)	II	Hills Road			2 November 1972	TL4547857770; 52°11′56″N 0°07′38″E		1126197	Upload Photo	Q26419173
War Memorial	II	Hills Road	statue		2 August 1996	TL4575057342; 52°11′42″N 0°07′52″E		1268368	War Memorial More images	Q26558679
The Church of Our Lady of the Assumption and the English Martyrs, Cambridge	I	Hills Road And Lensfield Road, CB2 1JR	church building		26 April 1950	TL4549057744; 52°11′55″N 0°07′39″E		1349061	The Church of Our Lady of the Assumption and the English Martyrs, Cambridge More images	Q130562
Gates and Railings of Cambridge General Cemetery Flanking Histon Road	II	Histon Road			2 November 1972	TL4432059620; 52°12′57″N 0°06′40″E		1099097	Upload Photo	Q26391255
Murray Edwards College (formerly New Hall)	II*	Huntingdon Road	college of the University of Cambridge		30 March 1993	TL4415559425; 52°12′51″N 0°06′31″E		1331922	Murray Edwards College (formerly New Hall) More images	Q1195404
The Grove	II	Huntingdon Road			2 November 1972	TL4399159491; 52°12′53″N 0°06′22″E		1235123	Upload Photo	Q26528477
Saxmeadham, Including Flanking Walls, Front Boundary Wall and Gate Piers	II	Including Flanking Walls, Front Boundary Wall And Gate Piers, 71 Grange Road, CB3 9AA			22 December 2014	TL4399458889; 52°12′34″N 0°06′22″E		1422623	Upload Photo	Q26676970
Upton House, Entrance Gates and Gate Piers, Garden Structures and Garage	II	11, 11a & 11b Grange Road, Including Front Walls, Gates And Piers, Garage, Sunken Pond, Terrace, Pergola, Bench And Garden Shed, CB3 9AS			22 December 2014	TL4390957640; 52°11′54″N 0°06′15″E		1422611	Upload Photo	Q26676968
Emmanuel College Sports Pavilion, Including Groundsman's House and Stable	II	Including Groundsman's House And Stable, 38 Wilberforce Road			22 December 2014	TL4352258697; 52°12′28″N 0°05′56″E		1422595	Upload Photo	Q26676962
Trumpington War Memorial	II*	Junction Of Church Lane And High Street, Trumpington	war memorial		12 February 1999	TL4455455119; 52°10′31″N 0°06′45″E		1245571	Trumpington War Memorial More images	Q17543319
Newnham College, Kennedy Buildings	II*	Kennedy Buildings, Newnham College			18 May 1967	TL4401757873; 52°12′01″N 0°06′21″E		1125508	Upload Photo	Q17543239
Westminster College Bounds	II	3, Lady Margaret Road			26 April 1950	TL4435259108; 52°12′41″N 0°06′41″E		1126183	Upload Photo	Q26419161
End House South and End House North	II	Lady Margaret Road			21 September 1999	TL4417859180; 52°12′43″N 0°06′32″E		1322139	Upload Photo	Q26607978
The Old Nurseries	II	2, Latham Road			2 November 1972	TL4515656747; 52°11′24″N 0°07′19″E		1348547	Upload Photo	Q26631920
Number 10 and Attached Garage/studio	II	10, Latham Road			21 September 1999	TL4494056872; 52°11′28″N 0°07′08″E		1322141	Upload Photo	Q26607979
River Farmhouse	II	19, Latham Road			5 October 1981	TL4475156862; 52°11′28″N 0°06′58″E		1126030	Upload Photo	Q26419016
Lensfield Road	II	41-57, Downing Terrace			2 November 1972	TL4524657647; 52°11′53″N 0°07′26″E		1100602	Upload Photo	Q26393084
Hobson's Conduit	II*	Lensfield Road	fountain		26 April 1950	TL4515257638; 52°11′52″N 0°07′21″E		1067788	Hobson's Conduit More images	Q17543186
Pair of Gate Piers Immediately to the West of the Church of Our Lady and the English Martyrs (roman Catholic)	II	Lensfield Road			2 November 1972	TL4546357754; 52°11′56″N 0°07′37″E		1126189	Upload Photo	Q26419167
Scott Polar Research Institute	II	Lensfield Road	higher education institution		2 August 1996	TL4542157698; 52°11′54″N 0°07′35″E		1268369	Scott Polar Research Institute More images	Q2747894
Clay Farmhouse	II	Long Road			4 December 1973	TL4503055577; 52°10′46″N 0°07′11″E		1235122	Upload Photo	Q26528476
Marshall House	II	6, Madingley Road			2 August 1996	TL4417659093; 52°12′40″N 0°06′31″E		1268370	Upload Photo	Q26558680
31, Madingley Road	II	31, Madingley Road			2 August 1996	TL4367659080; 52°12′40″N 0°06′05″E		1268371	Upload Photo	Q26558681
House and Brock Brothers' Studio	II	35, Madingley Road			2 November 1972	TL4361259110; 52°12′41″N 0°06′02″E		1331872	Upload Photo	Q26616733
Northumberland Dome at the Observatory	II	Madingley Road			2 November 1972	TL4318859402; 52°12′51″N 0°05′40″E		1126157	Upload Photo	Q26419135
The Main and Secondary Gateway to Madingley Road and the Boundary Wall	II	Madingley Road			2 November 1972	TL4439458988; 52°12′37″N 0°06′43″E		1126155	Upload Photo	Q26419133
The North West Range of Westminster College	II	Madingley Road			2 November 1972	TL4435759078; 52°12′40″N 0°06′41″E		1331871	Upload Photo	Q26616732
The Observatory	II	Madingley Road			26 April 1950	TL4324759441; 52°12′52″N 0°05′43″E		1126156	Upload Photo	Q26419134
Westminster and Cheshunt College	II	Madingley Road			18 May 1967	TL4441059026; 52°12′38″N 0°06′44″E		1126154	Upload Photo	Q26419132
Church Rate Corner	II	Malting Lane			9 April 1987	TL4445657746; 52°11′56″N 0°06′44″E		1126032	Upload Photo	Q26419018
Frostlake Cottage Little Newnham Malting Cottage the Loft	II	Malting Lane			2 November 1972	TL4449157781; 52°11′58″N 0°06′46″E		1126168	Upload Photo	Q26419146
Lodge and Gate Piers at Anstey Hall	II	Maris Lane, Trumpington, CB2 9LG			22 October 2021	TL4443454870; 52°10′23″N 0°06′39″E		1478099	Upload Photo	Q111853490
Maris House	II	Maris Lane, Trumpington			2 November 1972	TL4443754894; 52°10′24″N 0°06′39″E		1101728	Upload Photo	Q26395469
The Red Lion Public House	II	Mill End Road, Cherry Hinton	pub		2 November 1972	TL4858056405; 52°11′09″N 0°10′19″E		1126139	The Red Lion Public House More images	Q26419120
Custodian's House Mill Road Cemetery	II	Mill Road			2 November 1972	TL4606258140; 52°12′08″N 0°08′09″E		1083564	Upload Photo	Q26365719
Tomb of Edward and Elizabeth Rist Lawrence at Mill Road Cemetery	II	Mill Road	tomb		8 May 2000	TL4622958167; 52°12′08″N 0°08′18″E		1380305	Tomb of Edward and Elizabeth Rist Lawrence at Mill Road Cemetery More images	Q26660513
Tomb of Elizabeth Moyes at Mill Road Cemetery	II	Mill Road	tomb		8 May 2000	TL4607458184; 52°12′09″N 0°08′10″E		1380307	Tomb of Elizabeth Moyes at Mill Road Cemetery More images	Q26660515
Tomb of Elizabeth and George Kett at Mill Road Cemetery	II	Mill Road	tomb		8 May 2000	TL4607358177; 52°12′09″N 0°08′10″E		1380301	Tomb of Elizabeth and George Kett at Mill Road Cemetery More images	Q26660509
Tomb of George and Sarah Kett at Mill Road Cemetery	II	Mill Road	tomb		23 January 2003	TL4607158177; 52°12′09″N 0°08′10″E		1350396	Tomb of George and Sarah Kett at Mill Road Cemetery More images	Q26633607
Tomb of Harry Hall at Mill Road Cemetery	II	Mill Road	tomb		8 May 2000	TL4609558247; 52°12′11″N 0°08′11″E		1380302	Tomb of Harry Hall at Mill Road Cemetery More images	Q26660510
Tomb of Hermann Bernard at Mill Road Cemetery	II	Mill Road	tomb		8 May 2000	TL4620658209; 52°12′10″N 0°08′17″E		1380304	Tomb of Hermann Bernard at Mill Road Cemetery More images	Q26660512
Tomb of James Rattee at Mill Road Cemetery	II	Mill Road	tomb		8 May 2000	TL4607358182; 52°12′09″N 0°08′10″E		1380300	Tomb of James Rattee at Mill Road Cemetery More images	Q26660508
Tomb of William Crowe at Mill Road Cemetery	II	Mill Road	sarcophagus		8 May 2000	TL4614558106; 52°12′07″N 0°08′14″E		1380306	Tomb of William Crowe at Mill Road Cemetery More images	Q26660514
26, Millington Road	II	26, Millington Road			3 March 1998	TL4401157280; 52°11′42″N 0°06′20″E		1031582	Upload Photo	Q26282968
Gas Lamp Outside Nos 12 and 14	II	Millington Road			7 September 2010	TL4412157300; 52°11′42″N 0°06′26″E		1394519	Upload Photo	Q26673588
Gas Lamp Post Beside the Passage to Marlowe Road	II	Millington Road			7 September 2010	TL4412057260; 52°11′41″N 0°06′26″E		1394522	Upload Photo	Q26673591
Gas Lamp Post Between Numbers 1 and 3	II	Millington Road			7 September 2010	TL4414757435; 52°11′47″N 0°06′27″E		1394510	Upload Photo	Q26673582
Gas Lamp Post Between Numbers 28 and 30	II	Millington Road			7 September 2010	TL4398057254; 52°11′41″N 0°06′18″E		1394521	Upload Photo	Q26673590
Gas Lamp Post Between Numbers 33 and 33a, Millington Road	II	Millington Road			7 September 2010	TL4394757242; 52°11′41″N 0°06′17″E		1393954	Upload Photo	Q26673088
Gas Lamp Post Outside No. 20	II	Millington Road			7 September 2010	TL4407357261; 52°11′41″N 0°06′23″E		1394512	Upload Photo	Q26673584
Gas Lamp Post Outside Number 25	II	Millington Road			7 September 2010	TL4403357248; 52°11′41″N 0°06′21″E		1393948	Upload Photo	Q26673082
Gas Lamp Post Outside Number 36	II	Millington Road			7 September 2010	TL4391457250; 52°11′41″N 0°06′15″E		1393951	Upload Photo	Q26673085
Gas Lamp Post Outside Number 4	II	Millington Road			7 September 2010	TL4413357393; 52°11′45″N 0°06′27″E		1394511	Upload Photo	Q26673583
Gas Lamp Post Outside Number 7	II	Millington Road			7 September 2010	TL4413657333; 52°11′43″N 0°06′27″E		1394524	Upload Photo	Q26673593
Storey's Almshouses	II	7-17, Mount Pleasant			2 November 1972	TL4429659254; 52°12′45″N 0°06′38″E		1126142	Upload Photo	Q26419123
Chapel of St Edmund's House (roman Catholic)	II	Mount Pleasant			18 May 1967	TL4416859290; 52°12′47″N 0°06′31″E		1083566	Upload Photo	Q26365727
Fitzwilliam College, New Court	II	New Court, Storeys Way, CB3 0DG			19 June 2024	TL4388959458; 52°12′52″N 0°06′17″E		1489406	Upload Photo	Q136357709
Kerbstones to Pool in Courtyard to West of Hall, New Hall	II*	New Hall, Huntingdon Road	architectural structure		30 March 1993	TL4412459442; 52°12′52″N 0°06′29″E		1227647	Kerbstones to Pool in Courtyard to West of Hall, New Hall More images	Q17543314
Newnham College, House in the College Grounds Circa 100 Yards South of Clough Building	II	House In The College Grounds Circa 100 Yards South Of Clough Building, Newnham College			18 May 1967	TL4407657744; 52°11′57″N 0°06′24″E		1332188	Upload Photo	Q26617018
247, Newmarket Road	II	247, Newmarket Road	building		3 February 1994	TL4657958993; 52°12′35″N 0°08′38″E		1300768	247, Newmarket Road More images	Q26588048
The Globe Public House	II	529, Newmarket Road			19 September 1972	TL4728859440; 52°12′49″N 0°09′16″E		1126146	The Globe Public House More images	Q26419126
Church of St Andrew the Less	II	Newmarket Road	church building		26 April 1950	TL4629958905; 52°12′32″N 0°08′23″E		1126143	Church of St Andrew the Less More images	Q26419124
The Round House	II	Newmarket Road			19 September 1972	TL4723659455; 52°12′49″N 0°09′13″E		1084402	Upload Photo	Q26368060
Papermills	II	Newmarket Road			19 September 1972	TL4727559458; 52°12′49″N 0°09′15″E		1126145	Upload Photo	Q26419125
Chapel of St Mary Magdalene Stourbridge Chapel	I	Newmarket Road	church building		26 April 1950	TL4716359483; 52°12′50″N 0°09′09″E		1126144	Chapel of St Mary Magdalene Stourbridge Chapel More images	Q6527355
Perse Almshouses	II	1-6, Newnham Road	almshouse		2 November 1972	TL4446057674; 52°11′54″N 0°06′44″E		1346204	Perse Almshouses More images	Q26629774
36 and 36a, Newnham Road (see Details for Further Address Information)	II	34, Newnham Road			2 November 1972	TL4452457748; 52°11′56″N 0°06′48″E		1331868	Upload Photo	Q26616729
Mogford Lodge	II	Newnham Road, CB3 9EY			2 November 1972	TL4450957860; 52°12′00″N 0°06′47″E		1346213	Upload Photo	Q26629783
Newnham Mill	II	Newnham Road	watermill		2 November 1972	TL4457957752; 52°11′57″N 0°06′51″E		1331867	Newnham Mill More images	Q26616728
The Malting House	II	Newnham Road	house		2 November 1972	TL4452657785; 52°11′58″N 0°06′48″E		1126149	The Malting House More images	Q26419128
Selwyn College, North Range	II	North Range, Selwyn College			18 May 1967	TL4404557989; 52°12′05″N 0°06′23″E		1125492	Upload Photo	Q26418499
Newnham College, Old Hall	II	Old Hall, Newnham College			18 May 1967	TL4420157778; 52°11′58″N 0°06′31″E		1145879	Upload Photo	Q26439033
Newnham College, Old Library	II*	Old Library, Newnham College			18 May 1967	TL4414557869; 52°12′01″N 0°06′28″E		1332187	Upload Photo	Q17543383
27-41, Panton Street	II	27-41, Panton Street			2 November 1972	TL4532757515; 52°11′48″N 0°07′30″E		1126117	Upload Photo	Q26419098
Gates of the Panton Arms Public House	II	Panton Street			2 November 1972	TL4533157471; 52°11′47″N 0°07′30″E		1126118	Upload Photo	Q26419099
Newnham College, Peile Hall	II*	Peile Hall, Newnham College			18 May 1967	TL4399357818; 52°11′59″N 0°06′20″E		1186762	Upload Photo	Q17543302
Gaslamp	II	Peters Field			2 August 1996	TL4581258213; 52°12′10″N 0°07′56″E		1268342	Upload Photo	Q26558657
1-10, Petersfield	II	1-10, Petersfield			2 November 1972	TL4585058255; 52°12′12″N 0°07′58″E		1126094	Upload Photo	Q26419076
Newnham College, Pfeiffer Building	II*	Pfeiffer Building, Newnham College	building		18 May 1967	TL4420357802; 52°11′59″N 0°06′31″E		1125506	Newnham College, Pfeiffer Building More images	Q17543235
School House	II	Pound Hill			2 November 1972	TL4444259071; 52°12′39″N 0°06′45″E		1126102	Upload Photo	Q26419084
Barnwell Priory Barnwell Priory (the Cellarer's Checker)	II*	Priory Road	priory		26 April 1950	TL4625158974; 52°12′35″N 0°08′20″E		1126103	Barnwell Priory Barnwell Priory (the Cellarer's Checker) More images	Q4862023
The Sun House	II	23, Queen Ediths Way			2 August 1996	TL4690555660; 52°10′47″N 0°08′50″E		1268343	Upload Photo	Q26558658
Finella	II*	Queens Road	building		2 August 1996	TL4442258025; 52°12′06″N 0°06′43″E		1268344	Finella More images	Q17543323
Newnham Cottage	II	Queens Road			2 November 1972	TL4442058094; 52°12′08″N 0°06′43″E		1068629	Upload Photo	Q26321330
University Library	II	Queens Road	academic library		10 May 1962	TL4416158411; 52°12′18″N 0°06′30″E		1126281	University Library More images	Q1028334
Ridley Hall Chapel	II	Ridley Hall Road			2 November 1972	TL4436357880; 52°12′01″N 0°06′39″E		1331888	Upload Photo	Q26616747
Ridley Hall Entrance Block	II	Ridley Hall Road			2 November 1972	TL4439557846; 52°12′00″N 0°06′41″E		1356161	Upload Photo	Q26638855
Ridley Hall Gateway Onto Ridley Hall Road	II	Ridley Hall Road			2 November 1972	TL4441157846; 52°12′00″N 0°06′42″E		1126107	Upload Photo	Q26419088
Ridley Hall North Block	II	Ridley Hall Road			2 November 1972	TL4433657875; 52°12′01″N 0°06′38″E		1126106	Upload Photo	Q26419087
Ridley Hall West Block	II	Ridley Hall Road			2 November 1972	TL4431057844; 52°12′00″N 0°06′37″E		1068652	Upload Photo	Q26321352
Royal Albert Homes	II	1-25, Royal Albert Homes, Hills Road, CB2 1PP	building complex		2 November 1972	TL4589657080; 52°11′34″N 0°07′59″E		1349070	Royal Albert Homes More images	Q26632392
Alcantara	II	23, Sedley Taylor Road			8 March 2001	TL4598555685; 52°10′48″N 0°08′01″E		1246641	Upload Photo	Q26539039
Selwyn College Chapel	II	Selwyn College			18 May 1967	TL4407757945; 52°12′03″N 0°06′24″E		1125493	Upload Photo	Q26418500
Selwyn College Entrance Block	II	Selwyn College			18 May 1967	TL4399757950; 52°12′04″N 0°06′20″E		1332182	Upload Photo	Q26617016
Selwyn College Hall	II	Selwyn College			26 April 1950	TL4403457912; 52°12′02″N 0°06′22″E		1325987	Upload Photo	Q26611497
Selwyn College Master's Lodge	II	Selwyn College			18 May 1967	TL4406657920; 52°12′02″N 0°06′24″E		1125494	Upload Photo	Q26418502
Storey's Almshouses	II	1-9, Shelley Row			2 November 1972	TL4432559296; 52°12′47″N 0°06′40″E		1126086	Upload Photo	Q26419069
Katharine Stephen Rare Books Library	II	Sidgwick Avenue, CB3 9DF			18 April 2018	TL4418457880; 52°12′01″N 0°06′30″E		1450935	Upload Photo	Q66479106
Newnham College, Sidgwick Hall	II*	Sidgwick Hall, Newnham College	university building		18 May 1967	TL4416857833; 52°12′00″N 0°06′29″E		1145889	Newnham College, Sidgwick Hall More images	Q99671118
Gas Lamp Post Between Numbers 4 and 5	II	South Green Road			7 September 2010	TL4404857119; 52°11′37″N 0°06′22″E		1393949	Upload Photo	Q26673083
The Old Manor House	II	St Andrew's Road, Chesterton			13 March 1972	TL4632159609; 52°12′55″N 0°08′25″E		1126111	Upload Photo	Q26419093
Freemasons Hall the Careers Research and Advisory Centre	II	St Eligius Street			18 May 1967	TL4528957371; 52°11′44″N 0°07′27″E		1126082	Upload Photo	Q26419066
Church of St Matthew	II	St Matthews Street	church building		2 August 1996	TL4619158533; 52°12′20″N 0°08′17″E		1268345	Church of St Matthew More images	Q26558659
Church of St Peter	II*	St Peter's Street	church building		26 April 1950	TL4453059089; 52°12′40″N 0°06′50″E		1331919	Church of St Peter More images	Q7595223
With Attached Workshop Range and Front Railings	II	18 and 18a, St Peters Street			14 June 2002	TL4450159094; 52°12′40″N 0°06′49″E		1360789	Upload Photo	Q26642846
The Railway Station	II	Station Road	railway station		10 May 1962	TL4619157260; 52°11′39″N 0°08′15″E		1343683	The Railway Station More images	Q3088356
54, Storey's Way	II	54, Storey's Way			18 May 1967	TL4364359497; 52°12′54″N 0°06′04″E		1126091	Upload Photo	Q26419073
56, Storey's Way	II	56, Storey's Way			18 May 1967	TL4366259488; 52°12′54″N 0°06′05″E		1068856	Upload Photo	Q26321551
3 Linked Residential Courts Due South of Central Buildings Churchill College	II	3 Linked Residential Courts Due South Of Central Buildings Churchill College, Storeys Way			30 March 1993	TL4380959189; 52°12′44″N 0°06′12″E		1373886	Upload Photo	Q26654802
3 Linked Residential Courts Due West of Central Buildings Churchill College	II	3 Linked Residential Courts Due West Of Central Buildings Churchill College, Storeys Way			30 March 1993	TL4371259334; 52°12′49″N 0°06′07″E		1227711	Upload Photo	Q26521607
4 Linked Residential Courts Due South West of Central Buildings Churchill College	II	4 Linked Residential Courts Due South West Of Central Buildings Churchill College, Storeys Way			30 March 1993	TL4369759177; 52°12′43″N 0°06′06″E		1126007	Upload Photo	Q26418995
63, Storeys Way	II	63, Storeys Way			2 August 1996	TL4392159333; 52°12′48″N 0°06′18″E		1268346	Upload Photo	Q26558660
Central Buildings Churchill College	II	Storeys Way			30 March 1993	TL4378659274; 52°12′47″N 0°06′11″E		1227706	Upload Photo	Q26521602
Cambridge Gas Company War Memorial	II	Tesco Supermarket, Newmarket Road, CB5 8LD	war memorial		7 October 2015	TL4659859034; 52°12′36″N 0°08′39″E		1428632	Cambridge Gas Company War Memorial More images	Q26677467
Gas Lamp	II	Thrifts Walk			11 February 2004	TL4653659859; 52°13′03″N 0°08′37″E		1390990	Upload Photo	Q26670360
Anstey Hall	II*	Trumpington, CB2 9LG	house		2 November 1972	TL4438454830; 52°10′22″N 0°06′36″E		1331876	Anstey Hall More images	Q17527478
Bridge Over Hobson's Bridge at Entrance to the Botanic Garden	II	Trumpington Road			2 November 1972	TL4524257132; 52°11′36″N 0°07′25″E		1126075	Upload Photo	Q26419060
Bridge Over Hobson's Brook Mid Way Along Brookside	II	Trumpington Road			2 November 1972	TL4516557419; 52°11′45″N 0°07′21″E		1126074	Upload Photo	Q26419059
Bridge Over Hobson's Brook Opposite Pemberton Terrace	II	Trumpington Road	bridge		2 November 1972	TL4516357526; 52°11′49″N 0°07′21″E		1067752	Bridge Over Hobson's Brook Opposite Pemberton Terrace More images	Q26320549
Bridge Over Hobson's Brook at Brooklands Lodge	II	Trumpington Road			2 November 1972	TL4529957006; 52°11′32″N 0°07′27″E		1126039	Upload Photo	Q26419025
Brooklands Lodge	II	Trumpington Road			2 November 1972	TL4530657017; 52°11′32″N 0°07′28″E		1331938	Upload Photo	Q26616790
Chapel at the Leys School	II	Trumpington Road	church building		18 May 1967	TL4508657514; 52°11′48″N 0°07′17″E		1067806	Chapel at the Leys School More images	Q6815359
Gateway Onto Trumpington Road at the Leys School	II	Trumpington Road			2 November 1972	TL4513657543; 52°11′49″N 0°07′20″E		1331914	Upload Photo	Q26616770
Headmaster's House at the Leys School	II	Trumpington Road			2 November 1972	TL4505757480; 52°11′47″N 0°07′15″E		1126071	Upload Photo	Q26419055
Milestone Beside the Road Opposite Brookland Avenue	II	Trumpington Road	milestone		10 May 1962	TL4526756951; 52°11′30″N 0°07′26″E		1331915	Milestone Beside the Road Opposite Brookland Avenue More images	Q26616771
Railings Along the West Side of Hobson's Brook Stretching from Hobson's Conduit to Brooklands Avenue	II	Trumpington Road			2 November 1972	TL4515557539; 52°11′49″N 0°07′21″E		1126073	Upload Photo	Q26419058
Railings Round Hobson's Conduit	II	Trumpington Road			2 November 1972	TL4515757630; 52°11′52″N 0°07′21″E		1126072	Upload Photo	Q26419057
The Building Housing the Library at the Leys School the King George V Gateway	II	Trumpington Road			18 May 1967	TL4511457541; 52°11′49″N 0°07′18″E		1126070	Upload Photo	Q26419054
1, 1a and 1b, Water Street	II	1, 1a and 1b, Water Street, CB4 1NZ, Chesterton			2 November 1972	TL4663359906; 52°13′04″N 0°08′42″E		1126023	Upload Photo	Q26419011
5 (green Dragon Inn) and 7-11 Water Street	II	7 -11, Water Street, Chesterton	inn		2 November 1972	TL4667259916; 52°13′05″N 0°08′44″E		1126024	5 (green Dragon Inn) and 7-11 Water Street More images	Q26419012
17, Water Street	II	17, Water Street			2 August 1996	TL4669459932; 52°13′05″N 0°08′45″E		1268351	Upload Photo	Q26558664
History Faculty Building	II*	West Road, CB3 9EF	university building		12 April 2000	TL4419658046; 52°12′06″N 0°06′31″E		1380217	History Faculty Building More images	Q26660430
9, Wilberforce Road	II	9, Wilberforce Road			2 August 1996	TL4358858783; 52°12′31″N 0°06′00″E		1268352	Upload Photo	Q26558665
Hughes Hall	II	Wollaston Road			2 November 1972	TL4589257970; 52°12′02″N 0°08′00″E		1126027	Upload Photo	Q99662774
Old Milestone About 650 Yards South East from Red Cross	II	Wort's Causeway			2 November 1972	TL4765054938; 52°10′23″N 0°09′28″E		1331933	Upload Photo	Q26616786

== See also ==
- Grade I listed buildings in Cambridgeshire
- Grade II* listed buildings in Cambridgeshire

== Sources ==
- Bradley, Simon; Pevsner, Nikolaus (2014) [1954], Cambridgeshire, The Buildings of England, New Haven and London: Yale University Press, ISBN 978-0-300-20596-1
