= Centre for Mathematical Sciences (Cambridge) =

Research complex at Cambridge University

Coordinates: 52.21043°N 0.10188°E

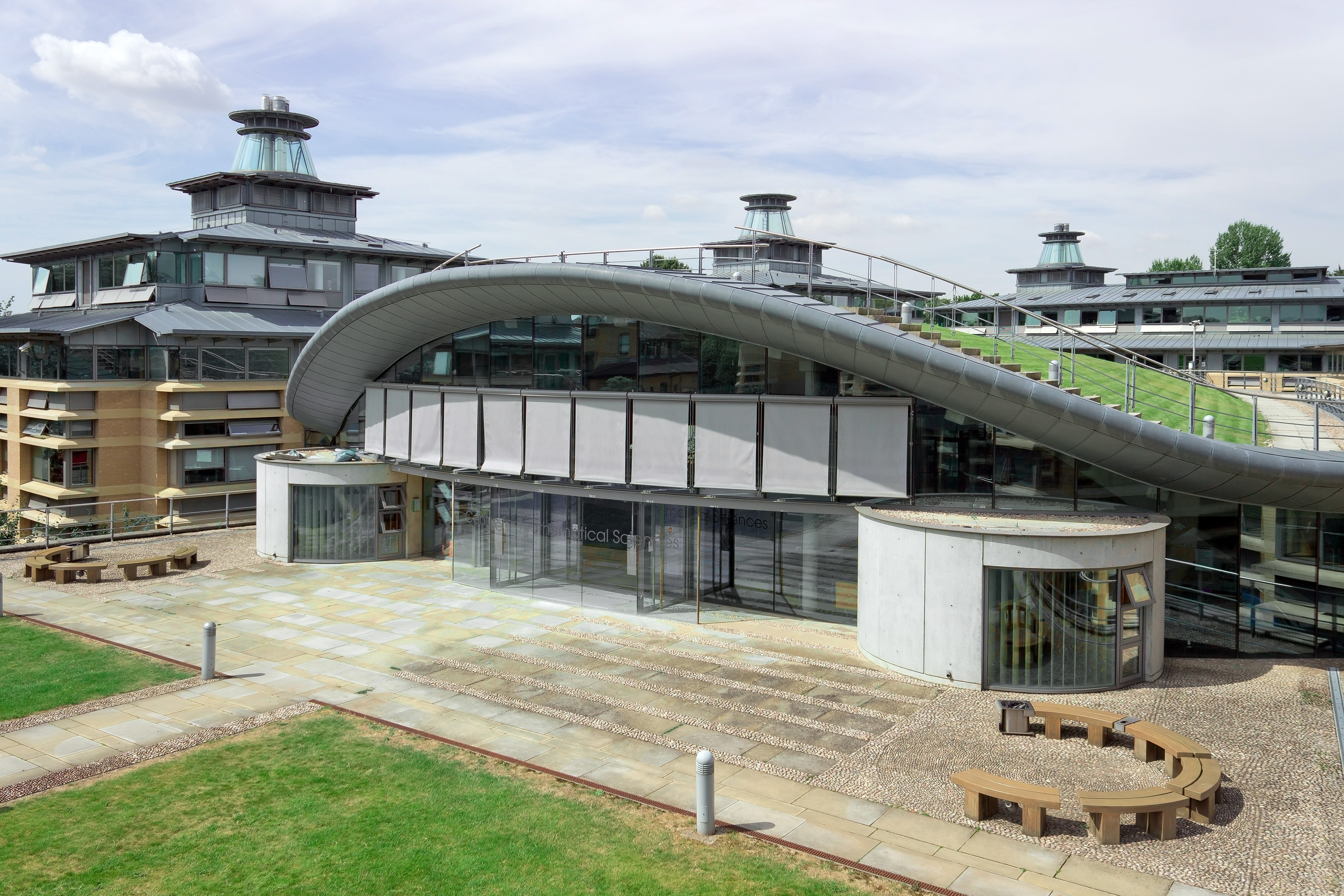
Centre for Mathematical Science, Cambridge

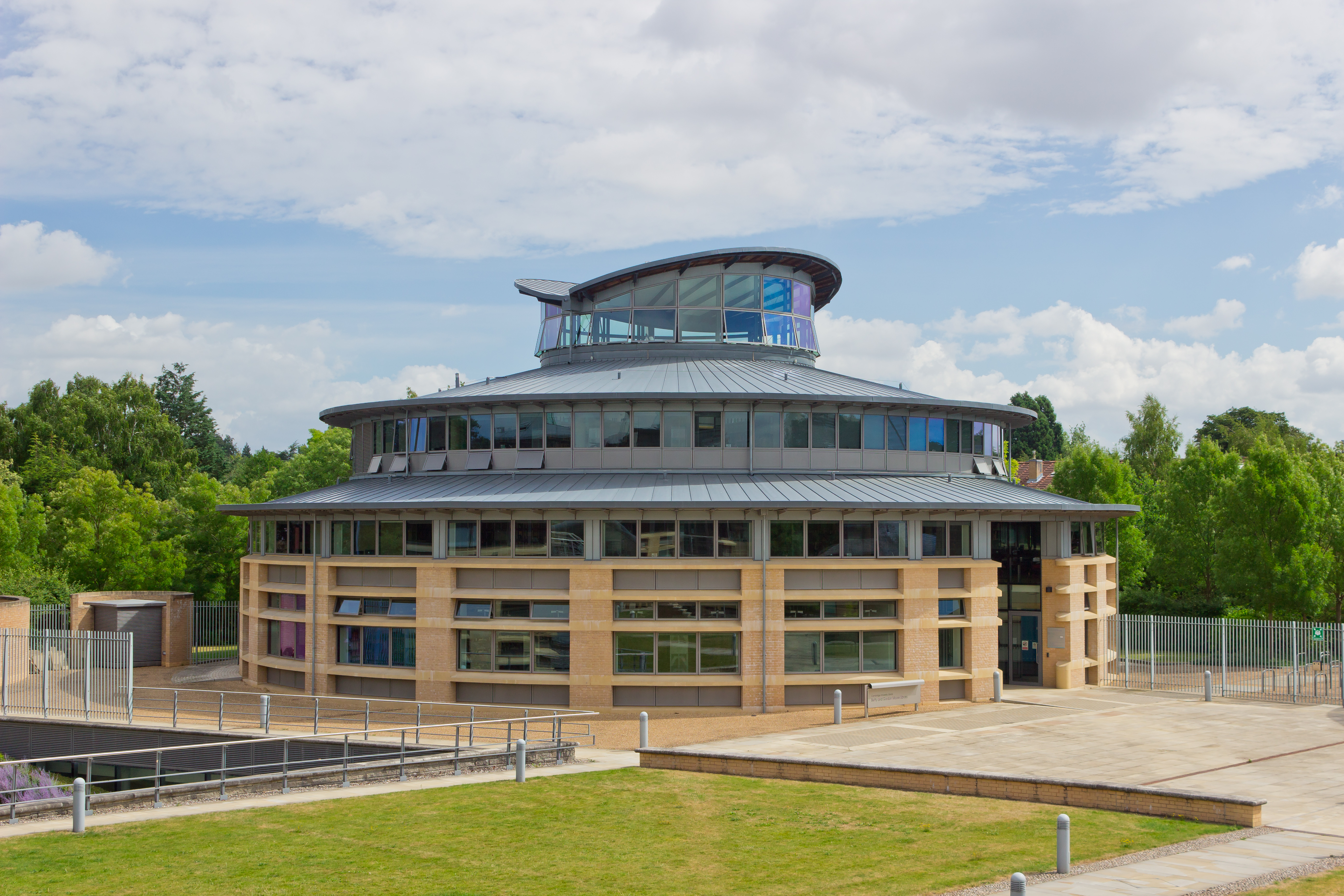
The Betty and Gordon Moore Library

The Centre for Mathematical Sciences (CMS) at the University of Cambridge houses the university's Faculty of Mathematics, the Isaac Newton Institute, and the Betty and Gordon Moore Library. It is situated on Wilberforce Road, on a site which was formerly a St John's College playing field, and has been leased by St John's to the university as part of its expansion into West Cambridge.

The Isaac Newton Institute was opened in July 1992. Andrew Wiles announced his proof here of Fermat's Last Theorem on 23 June 1993, though it required additional fine tuning. The rest of the site was designed by Edward Cullinan architects and Buro Happold and construction under project manager Davis Langdon was completed in 2003. It consists of 340 offices in 7 'pavilions', arranged in a parabola around a 'central core' with lecture rooms, common space, and a grass-covered roof, as well as a gatehouse. The design won awards including the British Construction Industry Major Project Award 2003, the David Urwin Design Award 2003, the Royal Fine Art Commission Trust Specialist Award 2003 and the RIBA Award 2003.

== Gallery ==
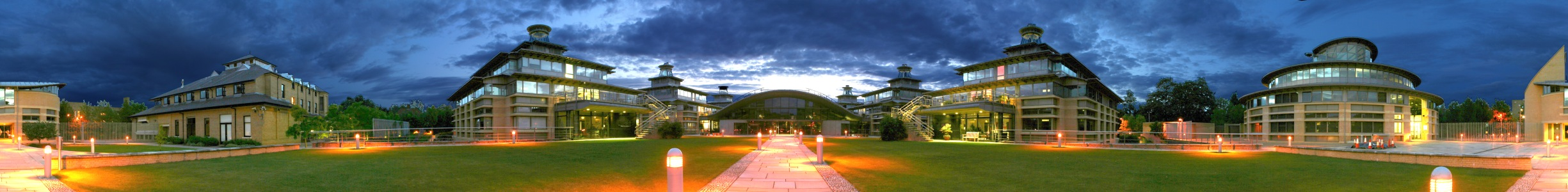
Panorama view of the Centre for Mathematical Sciences
