= Dora Cosens =

British architect (1894–1945)

Doris Morley Cosens (27 April 1894 – 5 October 1945; née Fletcher), often referred to as Dora Cosens, was a British architect, particularly known for her Modernist house, 9 Wilberforce Road in Cambridge. Along with Mary Crowley and Elisabeth Scott, she was among the earliest women architects to work in Britain during the modern era.

== Biography ==
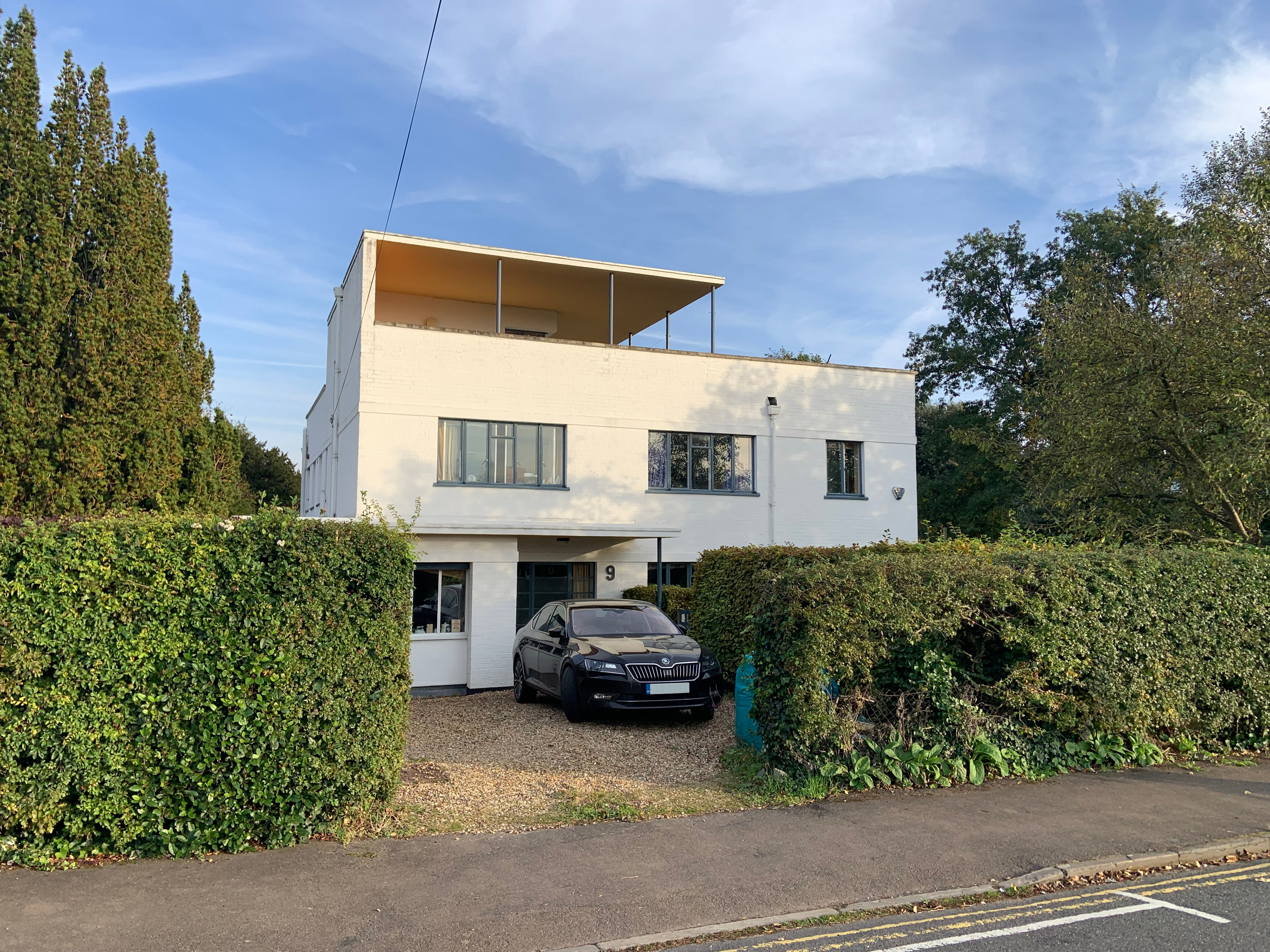
The Modernist 9 Wilberforce Road, Cambridge, is Cosens' best-known work.

She was born Doris Morley Fletcher in 1894 in Marylebone, London, to Arthur Morley Fletcher. She studied architecture at the School of Architecture of the University of Cambridge, probably under George Checkley. In 1916, she married the engineer, Charles Richard (Dick) Garrod Cosens (1893–1956). At that date, he was in the Royal Engineers; after the First World War, he studied at King's College, Cambridge, and later became a lecturer in engineering at the University of Cambridge.

During her married life, Cosens lived in Cambridge, latterly at 13 Millington Road. She was in practice as an architect in the town and additionally gave her profession as an art critic. Her reviews of books and exhibitions were published in the Architects' Journal; the architectural scholar Alan Powers comments that these reveal her to have been "well informed and critical about contemporary developments". Albert Hill describes her as an "energetic advocate of the Modern style". Her career as an architect was limited by two world wars, the demands of married life and her early death.

She died unexpectedly in Cambridge on 5 October 1945, aged 52. Her funeral was held at Cambridge Crematorium.

== Works ==
Cosens designed Orchard Lawn, 23 Kings Road (1930). This has a traditional design, being an updated version of a Cambridgeshire cottage with a mansard roof; it includes an early example of a built-in garage and is designated a building of local interest.

Her best-known work is 9 Wilberforce Road (1936–37), built for the zoologist William Homan Thorpe. One of twelve Modernist-style houses built in Cambridge before the Second World War, it is listed at grade II. The house is constructed in rendered or whitewashed brick on an atypical, almost-square plan, with two storeys. The flat concrete roof was designed for use as a roof terrace and features a prominent canopy. The main bedroom has a symmetrically placed balcony overlooking the garden, and the arrangement of windows creates interest by changing with the viewpoint. An important factor in the plan for the interior was to house Thorpe's piano. Unusually, the dining room and sitting room are placed at right angles. Powers describes it as an "assured design", noting the influence of Checkley's earlier houses on Conduit Head Road. The architectural historians Simon Bradley and Nikolaus Pevsner call it "rather heavily done". The estate agent Albert Hill includes it in a 2006 list of the ten best modern houses in Britain, describing it as having a "rigidly linear box-like appearance". The house was covered in the Architects' Journal in 1939.

Cosens at least drew up plans for alterations and extension to 13 Millington Road in 1936, for King's College. She was responsible for a small extension in 1944 to Willow House, a grade-II*-listed Modernist house on Conduit Head Road by Checkley (1932).
