= George Checkley =

New Zealand architect and teacher, 1893–1960, active in England

George Checkley (19 December 1893 – 17 November 1960) was a New Zealand-born architect and academic, who predominantly worked in the UK. He is known for being among the architects to introduce Modernist buildings to the UK, particularly with two of his houses in Cambridge – the White House (1930–31) and Thurso, now known as Willow House (1932–33). Willow House has been described as "close to being a text-book demonstration of Le Corbusier's architectural principles". After teaching at the University of Cambridge's School of Architecture (1925–34), Checkley successively headed the Schools of Architecture at Regent Street Polytechnic (1934–37) and the University of Nottingham (1937–48), where he also established a School of Town and County Planning.

== Early life and education ==
Checkley was born in Akaroa, New Zealand, in 1893, to Mary Pauline née Dallas and George Checkley (born 1865), a farmer. His grandfather of the same name was a dock worker, farmer, trader and inventor, who originally came from Grimsby, Lincolnshire. He was educated at the Boys' School, Christchurch, and then attended the University of Canterbury, studying architecture for a year, and also worked briefly in the Christchurch practice of the prominent architect Cecil Walter Wood. During the First World War, he was in the New Zealand Expeditionary Forces for 3.5 years, serving in France and Egypt.

In 1919, he moved to the UK, studying at the University of Liverpool's School of Architecture (1919–22), under a former serviceman's grant from the New Zealand government. He was one of several architects later prominent as British modernists who came from the British colonies and arrived in the UK at around this date; the others include Amyas Connell and Basil Ward (also from New Zealand), Raymond McGrath (Australia), and Wells Coates (Canada). At Liverpool, Checkley was taught by Charles Reilly, among others, and was a contemporary of Maxwell Fry. After graduating, Checkley spent a year at the British School in Rome, as the recipient of the Royal Institute of British Architects's Henry Jarvis Studentship of 1922; his work while in Rome was awarded an MA from the University of Liverpool.

== Career ==
In 1925, Checkley obtained a lecturership or demonstrator position at the University of Cambridge's School of Architecture. There he became part of a prominent group of architects born in the British colonies, including the Australian Raymond McGrath. Checkley left Cambridge in 1934 to serve as Master of the Regent Street Polytechnic's School of Architecture (1934–37; now the University of Westminster). He also maintained an architectural practice in Cambridge and London.

From 1937 until his retirement in 1948, he headed University of Nottingham's School of Architecture. There he established a five-year course, which was recognised by RIBA in 1941. He also established the university's School of Town and County Planning in 1942. He taught students but did not lecture. The demands of his later academic career seem to have put an end to his architectural practice; Thurso (Willow House) of 1932–33 was his final building.

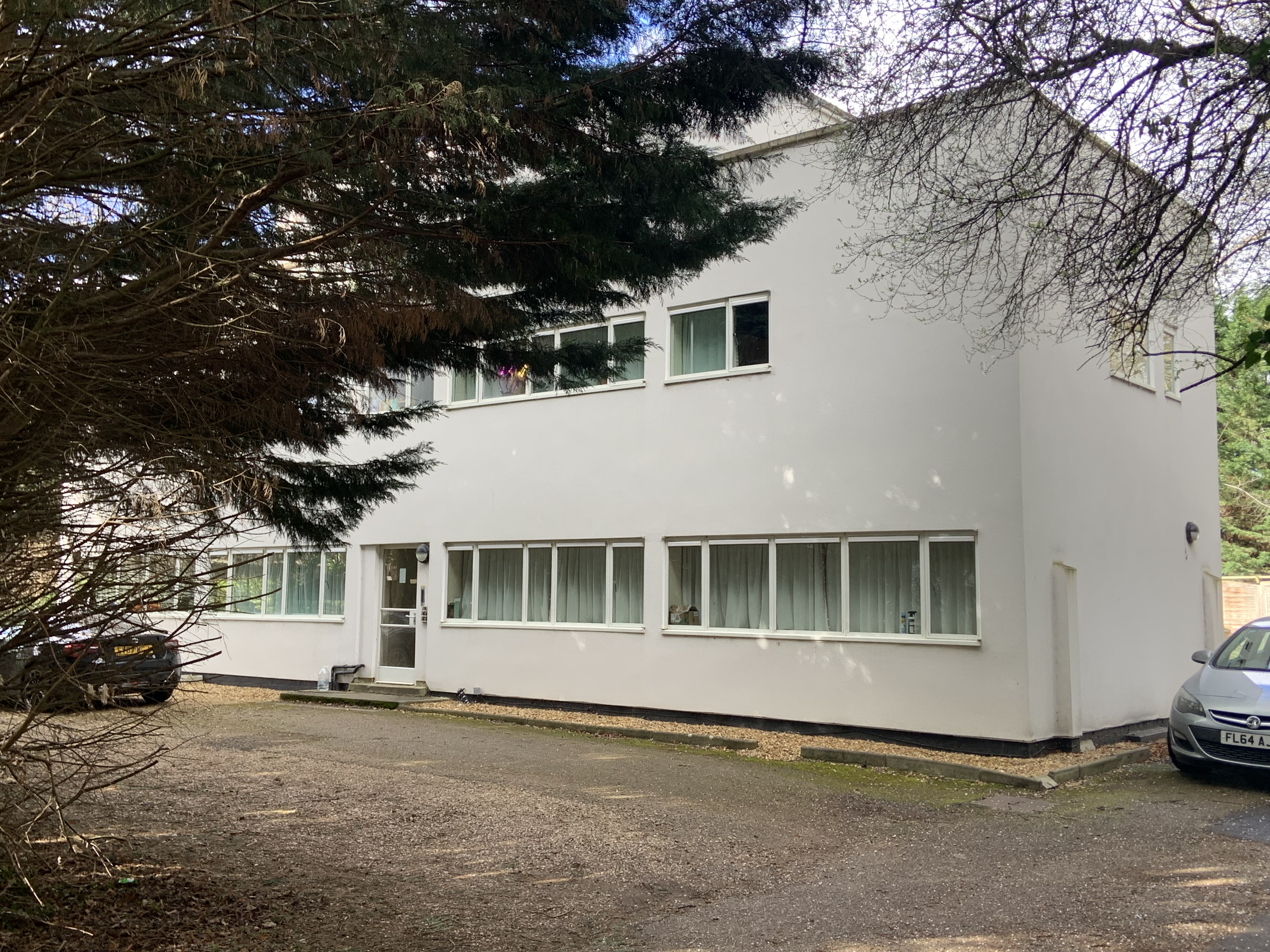
Front face of the White House

Checkley was described as a "remarkable teacher"; his notable students include Colin Lucas (1906–84), of Connell, Ward & Lucas, and probably Dora Cosens at Cambridge, and Gordon Graham (1920–97), at both Cambridge and Nottingham.

== Architectural style and buildings ==
Checkley's year in continental Europe on the Henry Jarvis Studentship gave him more experience of the Modernist movement in architecture than the majority of architects then working in the UK. He is among a group of architects credited with introducing Modernist buildings to the UK, as well as introducing the changes necessary to cope with the British climate. Other early proponents include Berthold Lubetkin, Wells Coates, F. R. S. Yorke, Maxwell Fry, Leslie Martin and Sadie Speight. Checkley's most notable buildings were completed in the early 1930s in Cambridge: two Modernist-style houses on Conduit Head Road in the west of the town. They are among the earliest Le Corbusier-influenced, white, flat-roofed buildings in England, in the style also referred to as the International Style or International Modern. (Note: According to Historic England, the earliest "truly convincing essay in the international style in England" was High and Over in Amersham by Amyas D. Connell, completed in 1930; it was preceded by the Modernist New Ways in Northampton, by Peter Behrens (1923–5).)

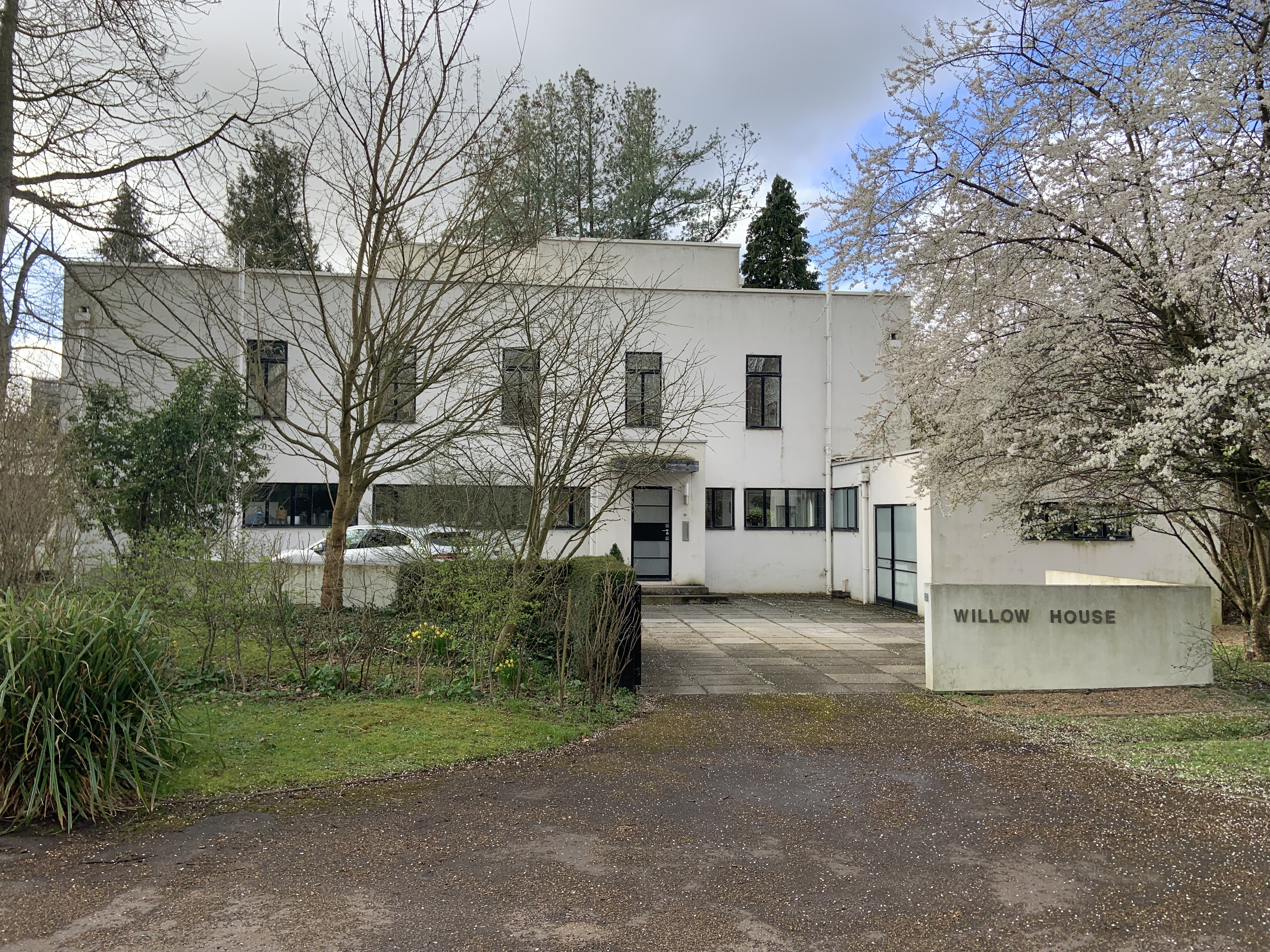
Front face of Willow House (Thurso)

The first, the White House (1930–31), is the first Modernist house in Cambridge, and among the earliest in Britain. It is listed at grade II. Checkley built the house for himself, on a symmetrical plan, using white-rendered brick and a concrete frame. A contemporary report in The Times describes the White House as lacking "ornamental excrescences" to "impair the rectangularity of a long, low elevation" interrupted only by windows. The article goes on to characterise the building as "an object-lesson in a new form of house", which forms a "vivid contrast to the historic and conventional styles of architecture of which Cambridge is so rich." The architectural historians Simon Bradley and Nikolaus Pevsner describe it in 2014 as having "all the requisites – but lifeless".

The slightly later Thurso, later renamed Willow House (1932–33), built for the chemist Hamilton McCombie, is described by the architecture scholar Alan Powers as "close to being a text-book demonstration of Le Corbusier's architectural principles". It is listed at grade II*, denoting "particularly important buildings of more than special interest". Using the same type of construction as the White House, it has a less-regular plan, featuring split levels and a roof terrace. Bradley and Pevsner consider Thurso "altogether livelier" than the White House. A 2003 article in the Architects' Journal finds Thurso's garden front to be more convincingly Modernist than its front face. Dean Hawkes observes that the house adheres to the environmental precepts of Arts and Crafts movement architecture, and detects inspiration from C. F. A. Voysey's Broad Leys of 1898.

In addition to The Times, Checkley's work was documented in contemporary articles in The Architect & Building News, the Architects' Journal and The Listener, as well as in Yorke's text, The Modern House in England (1937).

== Personal life ==
Checkley married the architect Isabel Maud Chambers, the daughter of Dr James Chambers of Roehampton, during his time in Cambridge. She had trained at the Architectural Association, and the two met in Rome while she was a Bernard Webb scholar, and were engaged in 1926. Isabel Checkley had a long-term illness, and her death precipitated depression in Checkley which led to his early retirement in 1948. His character was described as "retiring", with a "shy and aloof manner".

He died in Nottingham on 17 November 1960.

== References and notes ==
Sources

- Simon Bradley, Nikolaus Pevsner. Cambridgeshire (The Buildings of England series) (Yale University Press; 2014) ISBN 978-0-300-20596-1
- Alan Powers. Modern: The Modern Movement in Britain (Merrell; 2005) ISBN 9781858942551
- Tim Rawle. Cambridge Architecture (2nd edn) (André Deutsch; 1993) ISBN 0-233-98818-1
- Peter Richmond. Marketing Modernisms: The Architecture and Influence of Charles Reilly (Liverpool University Press; 2001) ISBN 9780853237563
