= Marshall Sisson =

British architect (1897–1978)

Marshall Arnott Sisson RA (14 February 1897 – 26 January 1978) was a British architect, active in 1928–70. Although his earliest buildings were modernist, after around 1935 he used only traditional styles and became known for his restoration work. He served as the Royal Academy's surveyor (1947–65) and treasurer (1965–70).

== Early life and education ==
Sisson was born in 1897 in Gloucester. He was educated at Leighton Park, the Quaker school at Reading, Berkshire. After working in Gloucester, he studied under Albert Richardson and James Burford at the Bartlett School of Architecture in London (1920) and the British School at Rome (1924). He researched Jerash's Roman architecture in the Middle East in 1926 and spent time in John Russell Pope's practice in New York in 1927.

== Career ==
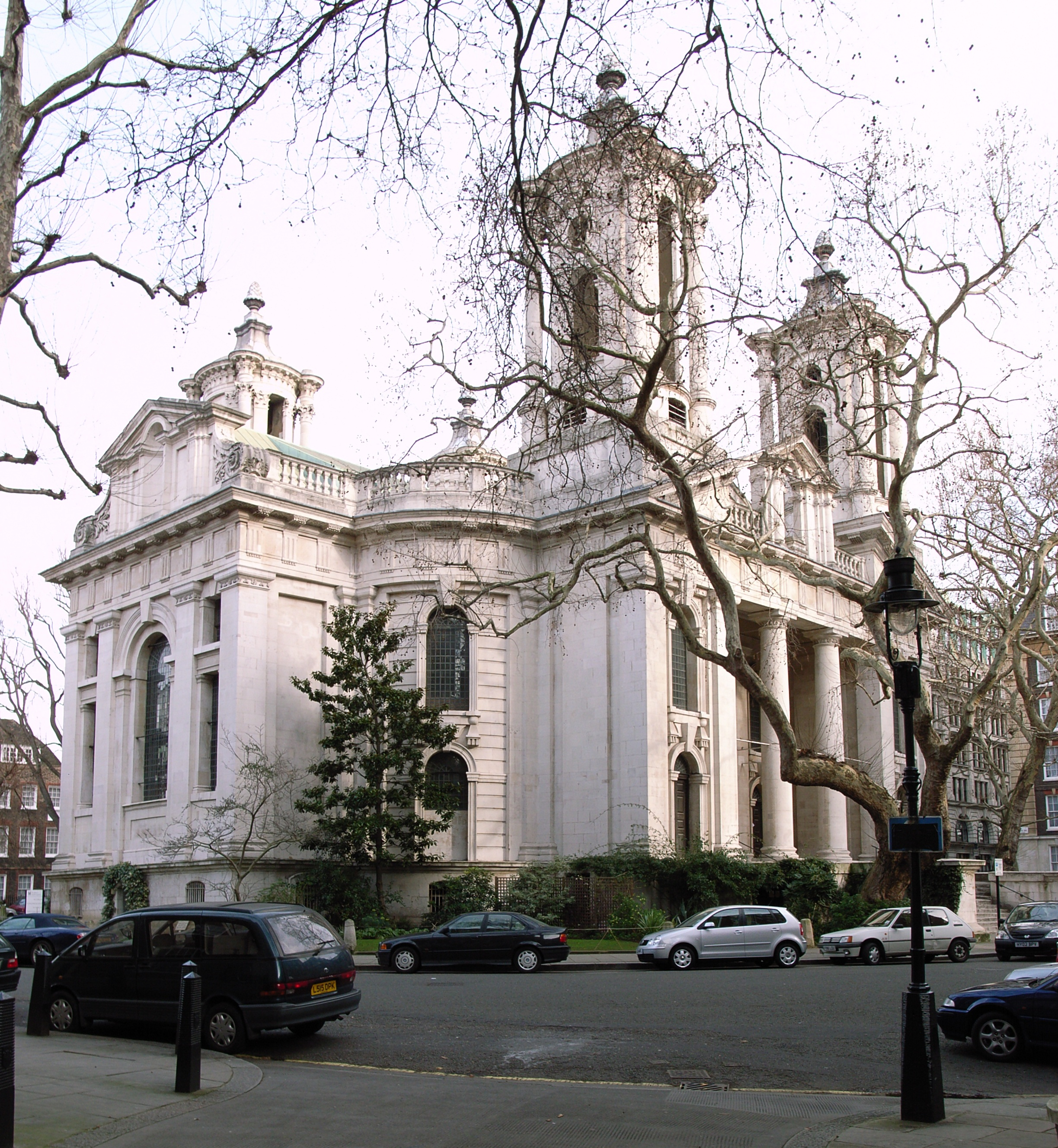
St John's, Smith Square, which Sisson restored after bomb damage

His early commissions, after opening his practice in London in 1928, were modernist in style. They include two cubical houses in Cambridge and a small residential development in Carlyon Bay, Cornwall, including Gull Rock House (1933–34), described as an early example of the use of monolithic reinforced concrete in England. One of these Cornwall houses was included in the "Modern Architecture in England" exhibition of the Museum of Modern Art, New York, in 1937, and also in F. R. S. Yorke's text, The Modern House in England (1937).

From around 1935, Sisson embraced traditional architectural styles, starting with a neo-Georgian public library for the town of Colchester (1937). By that date he had moved to the nearby village of Dedham, Essex. Major post-war projects include Orchard Building for Pembroke College, Cambridge (completed in 1957) and buildings for the University of Durham (1960–62), which were critiqued as "reactionary". James Bettley describes Sisson's non-modernist work as "self-effacing".

He also undertook many conservation projects, including work on London buildings damaged during the war such as St John's, Smith Square (1964–9), and projects for the National Trust. He was involved in dismantling and transporting St Mary Aldermanbury, a bomb-damaged Wren church, to Westminster College in Missouri. He rebuilt parts of Okeover Hall in Staffordshire in neo-Georgian style (1957–60), and converted buildings into Queen's Lane Quadrangle for The Queen's College, Oxford (1967–9). In later life, his practice was based in Huntingdon. Peter Foster (1919–2010) joined the practice in 1948 and later became a partner, taking over in 1971 after Sisson's retirement.

Sisson was surveyor to the Royal Academy from 1947 to 1965, master of the Architectural School, and treasurer from 1965 to 1970. He was elected as a Royal Academician on 26 April 1963. In 1949, he published a book, Country Cottages. He retired in 1970 and died in Cambridge in 1978. He left his house in Dedham, Shermans, to the National Trust.
