= Persean =

Persean may refer to:

- the mythological Perseus
- current or former pupils of The Perse School in Cambridge
