= Thomas Hobson (carrier) =

English carrier (c. 1544–1631)

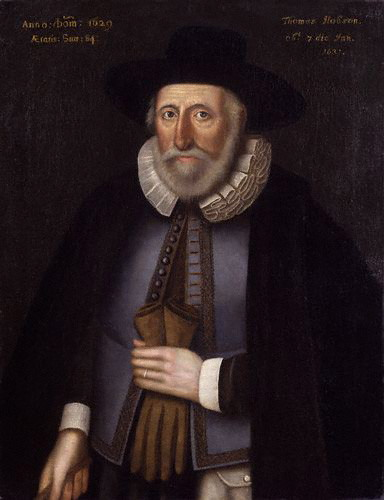
- 1629 portrait of Thomas Hobson, from the National Portrait Gallery
- Born: c. 1544; Buntingford, Hertfordshire, England
- Died: 1 January 1631 (aged 86); Cambridge, Cambridgeshire, England

Thomas Hobson (1545 – 1 January 1631) was an English carrier, best known as the origin of the expression Hobson's choice.

== Eponym ==
The term "Hobson's choice" originated in the mid-seventeenth century, after Hobson's death. The poet John Milton made Hobson, and the phrase, well known, by satirising him several times in mock epitaphs.

Here lieth one who did most truly prove
That he could never die when he could move

— John Milton, Roy Flannagan, John Milton: A short introduction.

== Career ==
Joseph Addison and his co-editor Richard Steele commented on Hobson in The Spectator:

Mr. Tobias Hobson, from whom we have the expression, was a very honourable man, for I shall ever call the man so who gets an estate honestly. Mr. Tobias Hobson was a carrier; and, being a man of great abilities and invention, and one that saw where there might good profit arise, though the duller men overlooked it, this ingenious man was the first in this island who let out hackney-horses. He lived in Cambridge; and, observing that the scholars rid hard, his manner was to keep a large stable of horses, with boots, bridles and whips, to furnish the gentlemen at once, without going from college to college to borrow, as they have done since the death of this worthy man.

I say, Mr. Hobson kept a stable of forty good cattle, always ready and fit for travelling; but, when a man came for a horse he was led into the stable, where there was great choice, but he obliged him to take the horse which stood next to the stable-door; so that every customer was alike well served according to his chance, and every horse ridden with the same justice: from whence it became a proverb, when what ought to be your election was forced upon you, to say Hobson's choice. This memorable man stands drawn in fresco at an inn he used in Bishopsgate-street, with an hundred pound bag under his arm, with this inscription upon the said bag:

"The fruitful mother of an hundred more."

Whatever tradesman will try the experiment, and begin the day after you publish this my discourse to treat his customers all alike, and all reasonably and honestly, I will ensure him the same success.

— "Hezekiah Thrift", The Spectator, 10 October 1712

Hobson arranged the delivery of mail between London and Cambridge up and down the Old North Road, (Note: The Roman Ermine Street, now the A10 road, which follows much the same path with a few minor diversions.) operating a lucrative livery stable outside the gates of St Catharine's College, Cambridge as an innkeeper. When his horses were not needed to deliver mail, he rented them to students and academic staff of the University of Cambridge.

The George Inn in Cambridge where Hobson's stable was situated was located on the current grounds of St Catharine's College and the stables were on the site of the current college chapel.

Hobson soon discovered that his fastest horses were the most popular, and thus overworked. So as not to exhaust them, he established a strict rotation system, allowing customers to rent only the next horse in line.

This policy, "this one or none" ("take it or leave it"), has come to be known as "Hobson's choice". It is not an absence of choice, rather choosing one thing or nothing.

In legal jargon, Hobson's Choice is known to barristers as the "cab-rank rule"; the gentleman's agreement that a barrister take a client who is first in line, whether the barrister likes it or not. This may come from Hobson's choice of renting out hackney horses strictly by rote (long before the creation of the London Hackney Carriages Act 1843).

== Public works ==
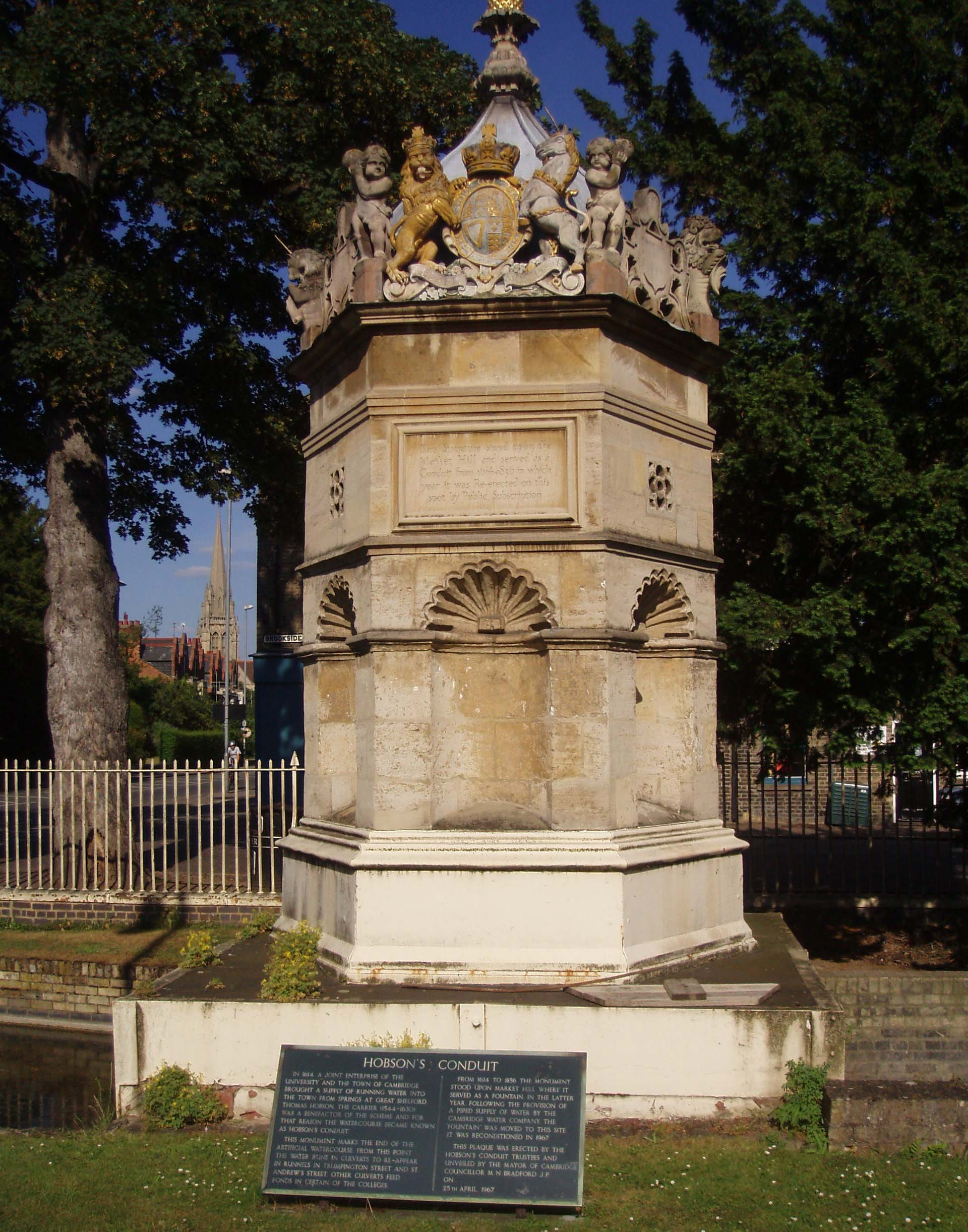
The reerected Hobson's Conduit fountain head beside Lensfield Road

Hobson is best remembered in the English vernacular as something of a miser, but he was actually a very public-spirited man. He funded the construction of Hobson's Conduit (or "Hobson's Brook"), a man-made watercourse built in 1614 to provide clean drinking water to the population of Cambridge. The conduit channelled water from Vicar's Brook, a lesser tributary of the River Cam fed by springs at Nine Wells five miles south of Cambridge.

Hobson is commemorated at Nine Wells on a nineteenth-century obelisk and in Cambridge on a seventeenth-century stone fountain at the conduit head. The fountain was moved there in 1856 from its original location in the Market Square after a fire in 1849, when it was replaced by a cast iron drinking fountain. Upstream the conduit is flanked by gardens adjoining Brookside and by the Cambridge University Botanic Garden. Downstream from the conduit head, the watercourse divides into four separate branches, mostly in underground culverts; the original drainage runnels on Trumpington Street, the oldest branch, are still visible on either side of the road.

== Later life and legacy ==
Hobson bought Anglesey Priory in 1625 and converted it into a country house, which, under the name Anglesey Abbey, now belongs to the National Trust.

Hobson had acquired lands around Chesterton, Cambridgeshire by the late 1590s, but by 1608 had assigned them to his son Thomas. Thomas junior predeceased his father (d.1627), and the lands were subsequently bequeathed to the latter’s son Charles. Hobson lived at Chesterton Hall in 1627, four years before his death in 1631. Hobson was buried at St Bene't's Church, Cambridge, near the chancel —although without inscription or monument. All 8 of Hobson's children were baptized in the church, and in 1626 he donated a 1617 edition of the King James Bible to the church (now held by Corpus Christi College, Cambridge, of which Hobson was a benefactor).

Hobson Street, in Cambridge city centre, is named after Thomas Hobson, and Hobson's Passage takes its name from Hobson Street.
