= Owen Giles =

Owen Giles was a professional rugby player at Northampton Saints, comfortable at any position in the back and second rows. Having attended The Perse School, Cambridge, Giles captained his school 1st XV and was on the Great Britain Rowing talent ID program.
