= Henry Mazey =

English educator (died 1677)

Henry Mazey (c. 1639 – 17 May 1677) was a Church of England clergyman, a fellow of Gonville and Caius College, Cambridge, and Master of two grammar schools.

== Early life ==
The son of another Henry Mazey, he was born in Cambridge about 1639 and baptized at Great St Mary's on 5 October 1640. Educated at the Perse School, he was admitted as a sizar to Gonville and Caius College, Cambridge, about July 1653, when his age was noted as fourteen. Mazey was a Scholar of his college from 1654 to 1661 and graduated BA in 1657, MA in 1661.

== Career ==
Mazey held a fellowship of his college between 1661 and 1665, but in the same period of four years he was also Master of Holt Grammar School in Norfolk. In September 1661, he was ordained a deacon in Norwich, then a priest on 12 July 1662.

In 1665, Mazey moved to Norwich to take on the Mastership of Norwich Grammar School, but stayed there only two years. The boys petitioned against him to the Mayor of the city, on the grounds that he was suffering from "chiragra, podagra, and desidia"; and that in the time of Mr Loveringe they had been "Minerva's darlings", but they were now "made Vulcan's servile bond slaves".

Mazey got away from Norwich by being appointed as Rector of Rockland, a benefice he held from 1667 until his death in 1677. He was also Rector of Egmere, Norfolk, from 1670, presented by Francis Rookwood.
