= St Bene't's Church =

Church in Cambridge, England

St Bene't's Church, Cambridge
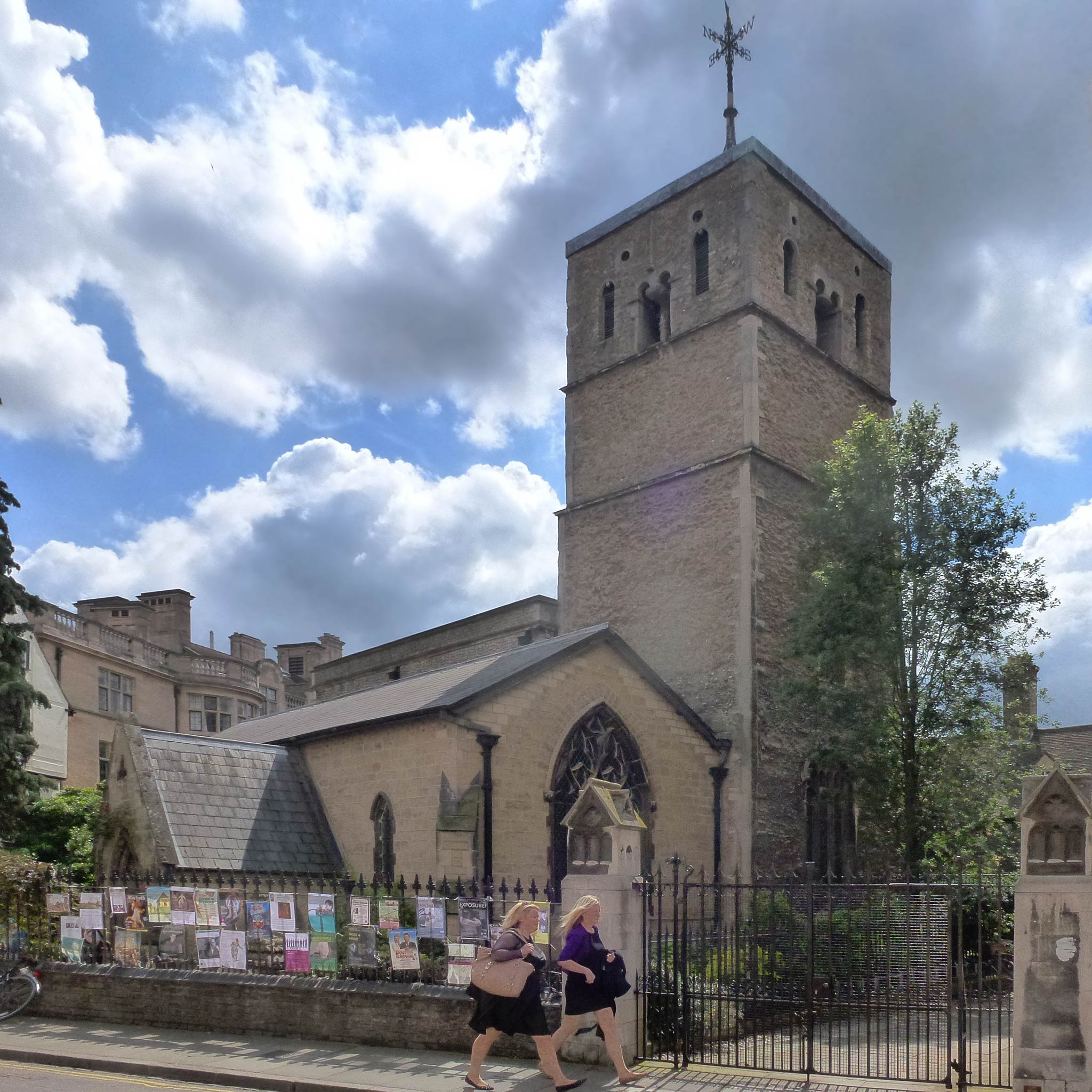
- St Bene't's Church with its Anglo-Saxon tower
- St Bene't's Church, Cambridge
- 52°12′13.0″N 0°07′06.0″E
- Location: Bene't Street, Cambridge
- Country: England
- Denomination: Church of England
- Website: https://www.stbenetschurch.org

History
- Status: Active
- Founded: c.1020

Architecture
- Functional status: Parish church
- Heritage designation: Grade I listed

Administration
- Diocese: Diocese of Ely
- Archdeaconry: Archdeaconry of Cambridge

Clergy
- Bishop(s): The Rt Revd Dagmar Winter, acting Bishop of Ely
- Vicar: The Rev’d Devin Shepard McLachlan

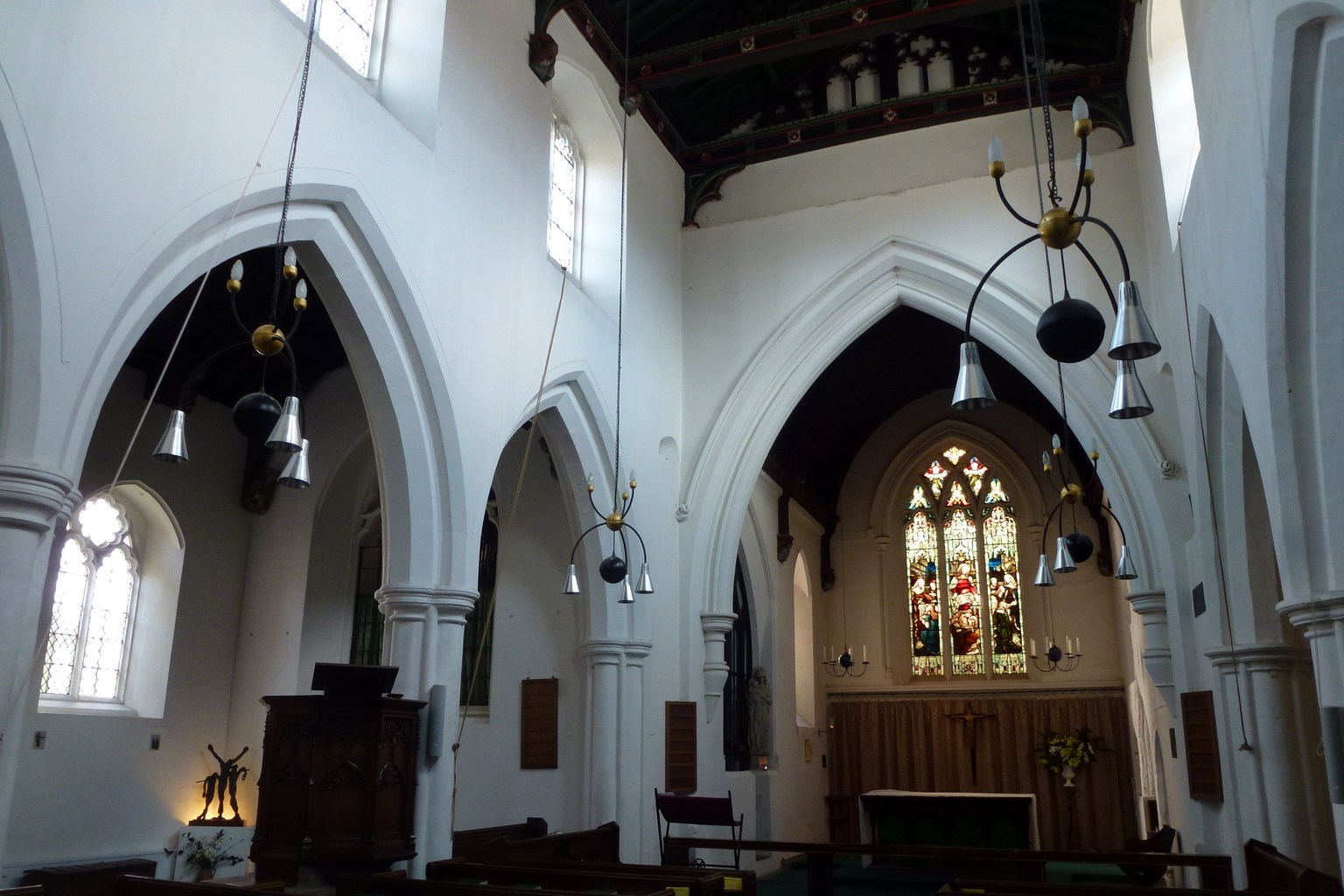
Interior of the nave, looking towards the chancel (right) and north aisle (left)

St Bene't's Church is a Church of England parish church in central Cambridge, England. Parts of the church, most notably the tower, are Anglo-Saxon, and it is the oldest church in Cambridgeshire as well as the oldest building in Cambridge.

The church is dedicated to Saint Benedict of Nursia, the founder of the Benedictine order of monasticism. Bene't is an attempt to reconcile the Anglo-Norman name Benet with the Latin (and modern English) form of the saint's name Benedict. Latin documents from the 13th and 14th century refer to "ecclesie sancti Benedicti" while a contract (in English) of 6 June 1452 for a new roof referred to the "cherche of seynt Bennettys". Lyne's map of Cambridge of 1574 shows "Benett Ch" while Loggan's map of 1688 shows "St Bennetts Church". In the 19th century the church was variously referred to as being of "St Benedict", "St Benet" or "St Bene't". Modern usage is either "St Benet" or "St Bene't".

== Location ==
The church is on the south side of Bene't Street next to Corpus Christi College. St Bene't's was the College's chapel until 1579. The College remains the church's patron, and there are continuing links between the church and the College chapel. Opposite the church on the north side of Bene't Street is the Eagle Pub.

== History ==
St Bene't's Anglo-Saxon tower was "most probably" built between AD 1000 and 1050, although the present bell-openings were added in 1586. The tower has characteristically Anglo-Saxon long-and-short quoins. These project beyond the rubble face, indicating that the tower used to be rendered, as All Saints' Church, Earls Barton in Northamptonshire is. Inside the church the 11th-century arch supporting the tower is the most notable feature.

The arcade of the nave is from a rebuilding of c.1300, when the aisles were also rebuilt. The 14th-century aisles and the north and east walls of the chancel were razed when the church was widened during two Victorian restorations: in 1853 Raphael Brandon rebuilt the north aisle and added the porch; in 1872 Arthur Blomfield rebuilt the south aisle, the chancel and the clerestory of the nave including the chancel arch. During these works Anglo-Saxon footings of quoins were found which indicated that the original nave was wider than it is today. It is not known when aisles were first added, but it seems likely to have been at a rebuilding before that of c.1300.

In the 13th century the chancel was altered, hence the deeply splayed Early English Gothic lancet windows on the south side (one of which is now blocked). The sedilia and piscina in the chancel are 14th-century, with Decorated Gothic ogeed arches. The clerestory and roof of the nave are late Perpendicular Gothic and date from 1452.

St Bene't's has one monumental brass: a small kneeling figure of Richard de Billingford, who died in 1432 and had been Master of Corpus Christi College from 1398 to 1432.

The church is a Grade I listed building.

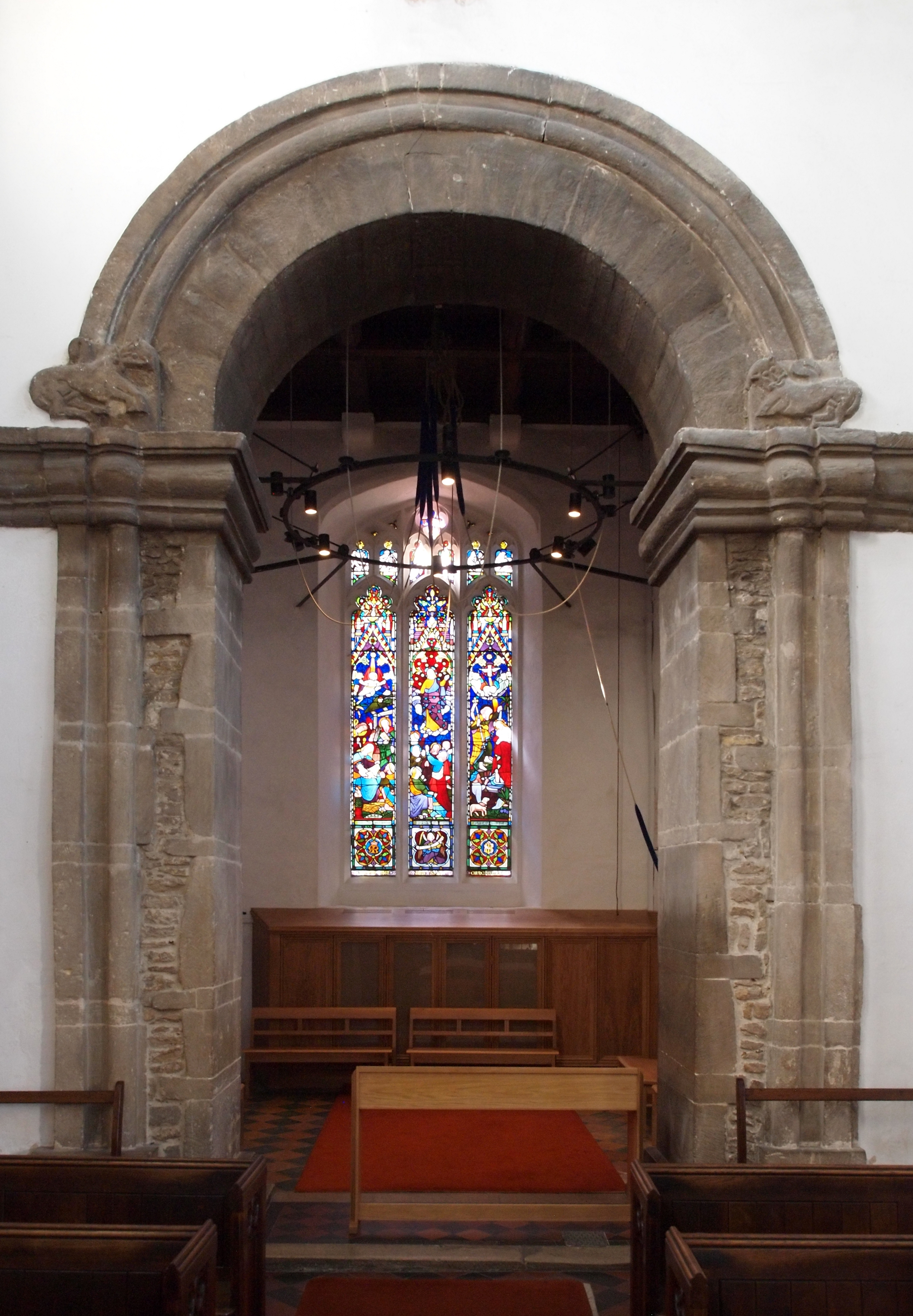
The 11th-century tower arch with animal carvings

== Bells ==
From its earliest days until the 17th century, the University paid the church to use its bells. A document of 1273 records that the rector agreed to the bells being rung for the University provided the "customary gratification" was paid. This became an annual sum of six shillings and eight pence which was paid as late as 1624, after the tower of Great St Mary's had been completed. In 1655 the University gave thirty shillings "as a free gift" towards the repair of the bells.

The tower has a ring of six bells, five of which date from the 16th or 17th centuries. The oldest is the second bell, cast by an unknown bellfounder in 1588. A local founder, Richard Holdfield of Cambridge, cast the third bell in 1607 and the fifth bell in 1610. John Draper of Thetford cast the tenor bell in 1618 and Robert Gurney of Bury St Edmunds cast the treble bell in 1663. The youngest is the fourth bell, cast by William Dobson of Downham Market in 1825. Dobson was a prolific bellfounder and 233 of his bells are known to survive. Surviving bells by Holdfield, Draper or Gurney are much rarer.

== People ==
Michael Ramsey, who later became Archbishop of Canterbury, was vicar 1938-1940. Brothers of the Society of Saint Francis (among them Br Michael Fisher) served at St Bene't's from 1945 until 2005. The Revd Canon Angela Tilby, a regular contributor to BBC Radio 4's Thought for the Day, was vicar, 2007–11. The Revd Canon Anna Matthews, previously precentor of St Albans Cathedral, served as vicar from September 2012 until her death in March 2023. Revd Dr James Gardom, usually Dean of Pembroke College, took over the post from 2023-24. The Revd Devin McLachlan has been Vicar since 13 September 2024.

Fabian Stedman (1640–1713), a pioneer in the development of change ringing, was clerk of the parish in the mid-17th century.

== See also ==
- Leper Chapel of St Mary Magdalene, dating from 1125
- Church of the Holy Sepulchre, Cambridge or Round Church, dating from 1130
- School of Pythagoras, the oldest secular building in Cambridge, dating from about 1200
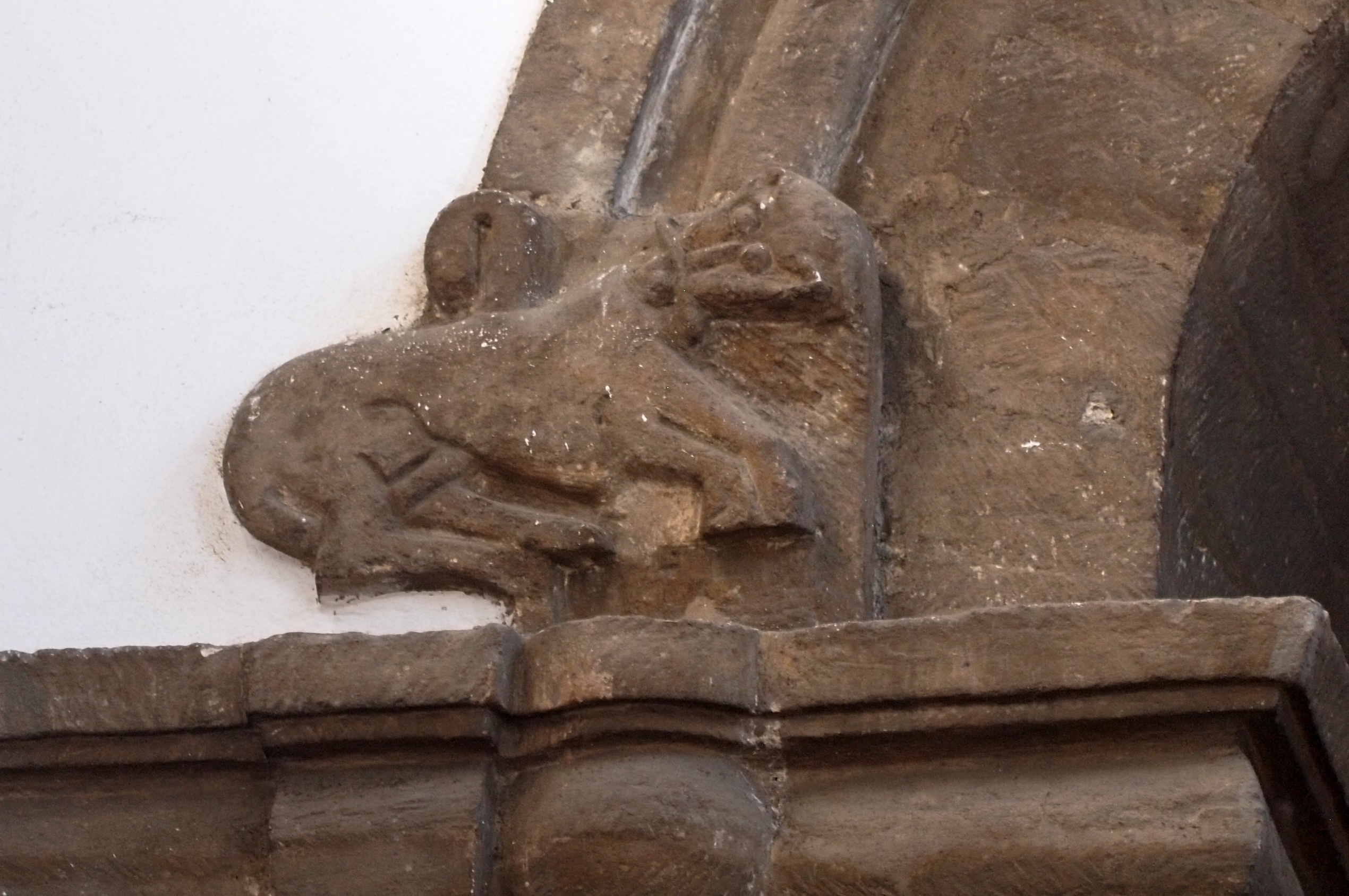
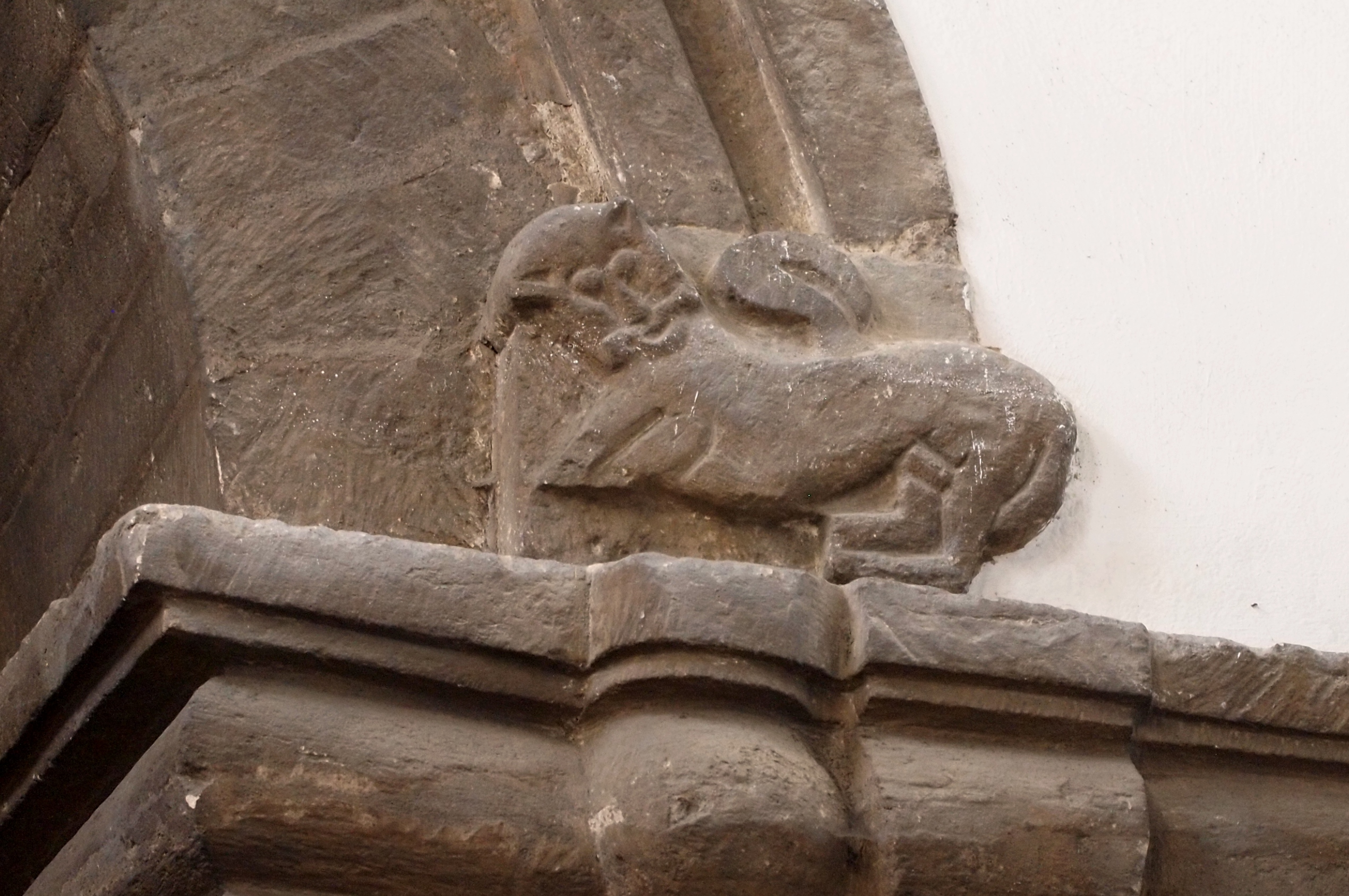
Close-ups of the carved animals on the tower arch

== Sources and further reading ==
- Willis, Robert (1886). Clark, John Willis (ed.). The Architectural History of the University of Cambridge Volume I. Cambridge: Cambridge University Press. pp. 271–288.
- Josselin, John (1880). Clark, John Willis (ed.). Historiola Collegii Corporis Christi. Cambridge: Cambridge Antiquarian Society.
- Pevsner, Nikolaus (1970) [1954]. Cambridgeshire. The Buildings of England. Harmondsworth: Penguin Books. pp. 222–223. ISBN 0-14-071010-8.
- Royal Commission on the Historical Monuments of England (1959). An Inventory of the Historical Monuments in the City of Cambridge Part II. London: HMSO. pp. 263–266.
- Roach, J.P.C., ed. (1959). A History of the County of Cambridge and the Isle of Ely: Volume 3: The City and University of Cambridge. Victoria County History. pp. 123–132.
