= Simon Akam =

British journalist and historian

- Born: Cambridge, England
- Education: Worcester College, Oxford
- Occupations: Journalist, writer

Simon Akam is a British journalist and historian of the British Army.

== Early life ==
Akam was born in Cambridge and educated at The Perse School, the University of Oxford, and Columbia University. During his gap year in 2003, he served a short service limited commission as a second lieutenant in the British Army.

== Published works ==
Akam has written for a number of publications including The Guardian, The New York Times, Reuters, The Economist, GQ, and The Atlantic.

=== The Changing of the Guard ===
In 2015, Akam was commissioned by Penguin Random House imprint William Heinemann to write a book on the British Army. Amid controversy, the book deal was later cancelled, and the resulting book was instead published by Scribe Publications in 2021. The book's eventual publication provoked debate, with Anthony Loyd writing in the New Statesman that the book 'exposes the failures of the British army'.

== Awards and honours ==
In 2021, Akam was shortlisted for the Orwell Prize.

In 2021, Akam and Natasha Loder jointly won a Feature of the Year prize from the Medical Journalists’ Association.

== Works ==
- The Changing of the Guard: The British Army Since 9/11 (2021)
