= Richard Hesketh =

English cricketer

Personal information
- Full name: Richard Lindsay Hesketh
- Born: 30 March 1988 (age 38); Cambridge, Cambridgeshire, England
- Batting: Right-handed
- Bowling: Slow left-arm orthodox

Domestic team information
- Years: Team
- 2010: Cambridge MCCU
- 2010: Cambridge University

Career statistics
Competition	First-class
Matches	2
Runs scored	38
Batting average	12.66
100s/50s	–/–
Top score	20
Balls bowled	18
Wickets	0
Bowling average	–
5 wickets in innings	–
10 wickets in match	–
Best bowling	–
Catches/stumpings	1/–
- Source: Cricinfo, 18 August 2020

Richard Lindsay Hesketh (born 30 March 1988) is an English medical doctor and a former first-class cricketer.

Hesketh was born at Cambridge in March 1988. He was educated in Cambridge at The Perse School, before going up to Cardiff University to study medicine. From there he studied for his doctorate at Christ's College, Cambridge. While studying at Cambridge, he made two appearances in first-class cricket in 2010, playing one match apiece for Cambridge MCCU (Note: Cambridge MCCU differed from Cambridge University Cricket Club in that it was open to students at Anglia Ruskin University, whereas Cambridge University Cricket Club is exclusively for students of the constituent colleges of the University of Cambridge.) against Leicestershire at Fenner's and for Cambridge University against Oxford University in The University Match at Oxford. He scored 38 runs in these two matches, with a high score of 20.
