= Bene't Street =

Street in Cambridge, United Kingdom

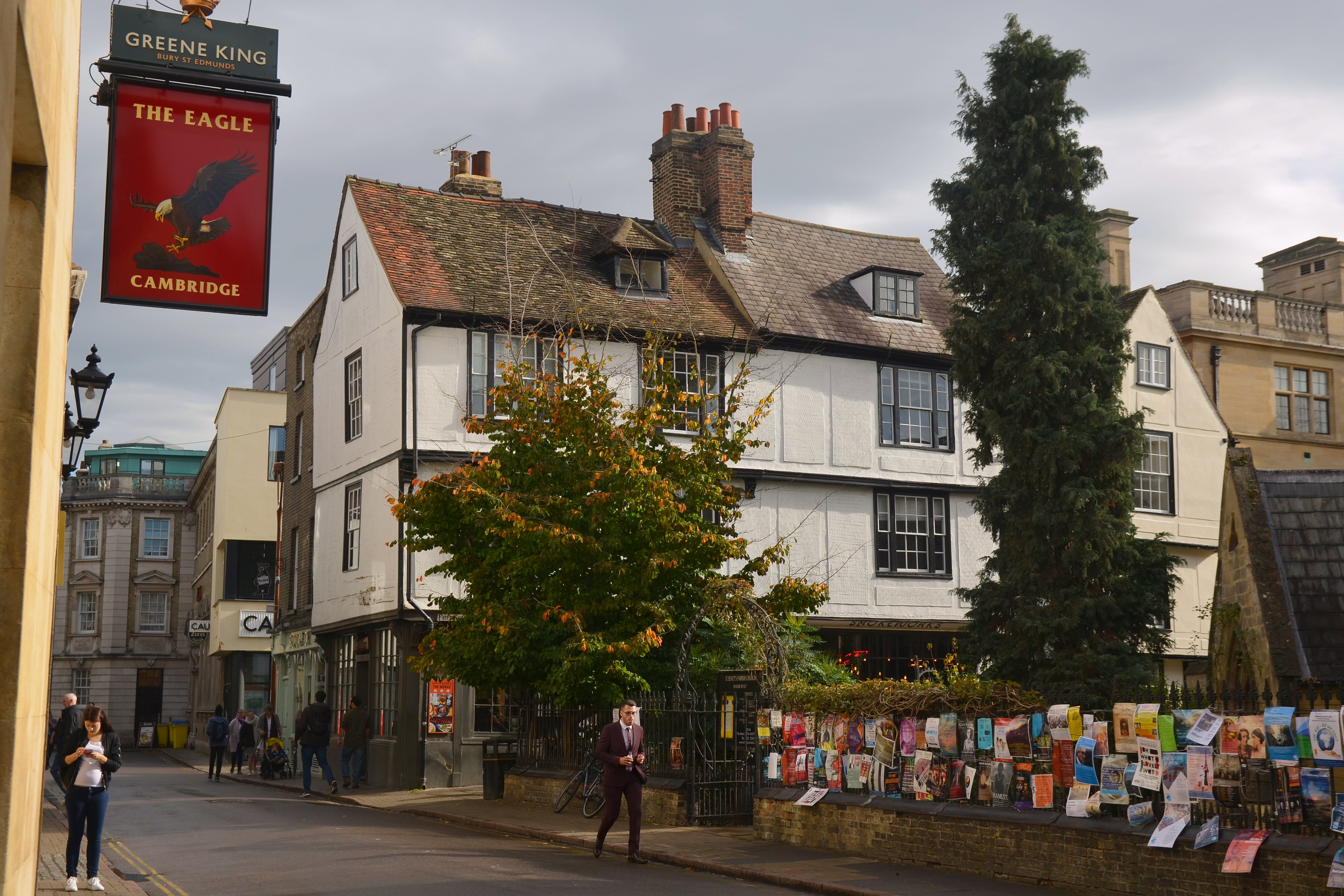
- Looking east along Bene't Street from The Eagle
- Length: 350 ft (110 m)
- Postal code: CB2 3
- Coordinates: 52.204°N 0.1183°E
- east end: Wheeler Street
- west end: Trumpington Street

Bene't Street is a short historic street in central Cambridge, England, the name being derived from St Benedict. There is a junction with King's Parade to the north and Trumpington Street to the south at the western end of the street. Free School Lane leads off to the south. To the east, the street continues as Wheeler Street.

== History ==
The street is named after St Bene't's Church. Bene't is a contraction of Benedict, hence the unusual apostrophe in the name. The Anglo-Saxon tower of St Bene't's, built sometime between 1000–1050AD, is the oldest standing building in Cambridgeshire.

The Eagle pub is on the north side of the street. In this pub, Francis Crick interrupted lunchtime patrons on 28 February 1953 to announce that he and James Watson had discovered the structure of DNA. There is a blue plaque on the outside wall of the pub to commemorate the event.

The main site of Corpus Christi College is located on the south side of the street. It also has accommodation on the north side of the street. On the corner of the College with Trumpington Street is the Corpus Clock, installed in 2008. The main entrance of the college is in Trumpington Street.

While at Cambridge University, Clive James and Germaine Greer lived at Friar House, an early-17th-century Grade II listed building with a timber frame and pargeting at the corner of Bene't Street and Free School Lane.

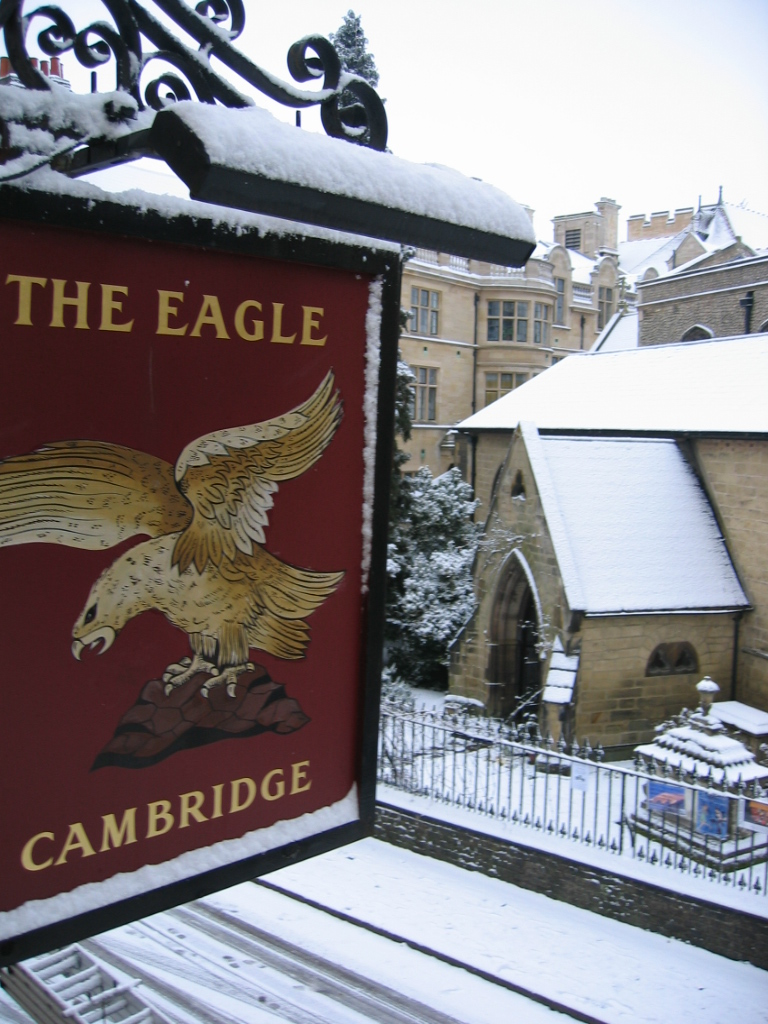
The main signboard of The Eagle pub in the snow on Bene't Street, as seen from the Corpus Christi College accommodation above

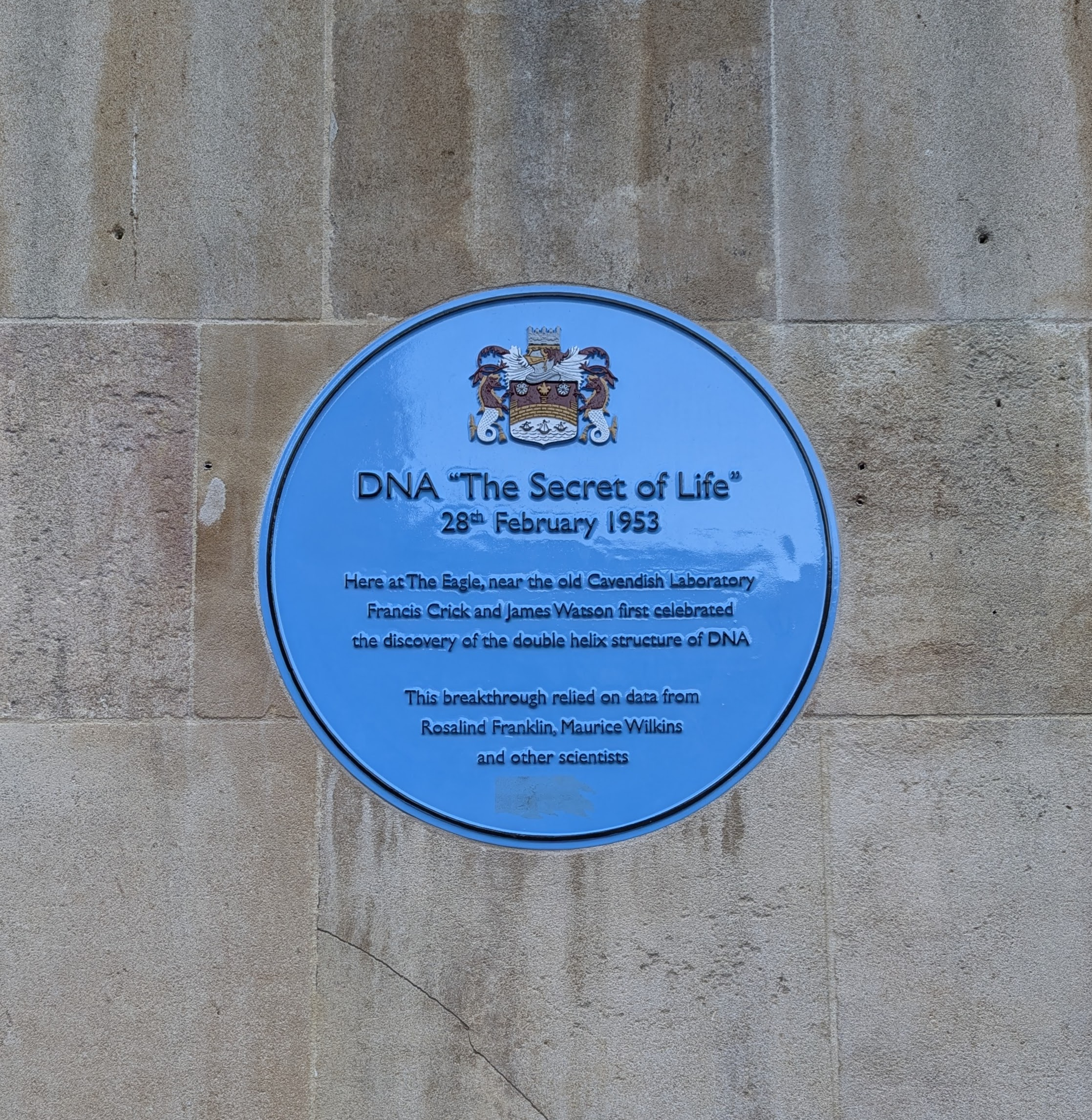
The blue plaque outside The Eagle pub on Bene't Street

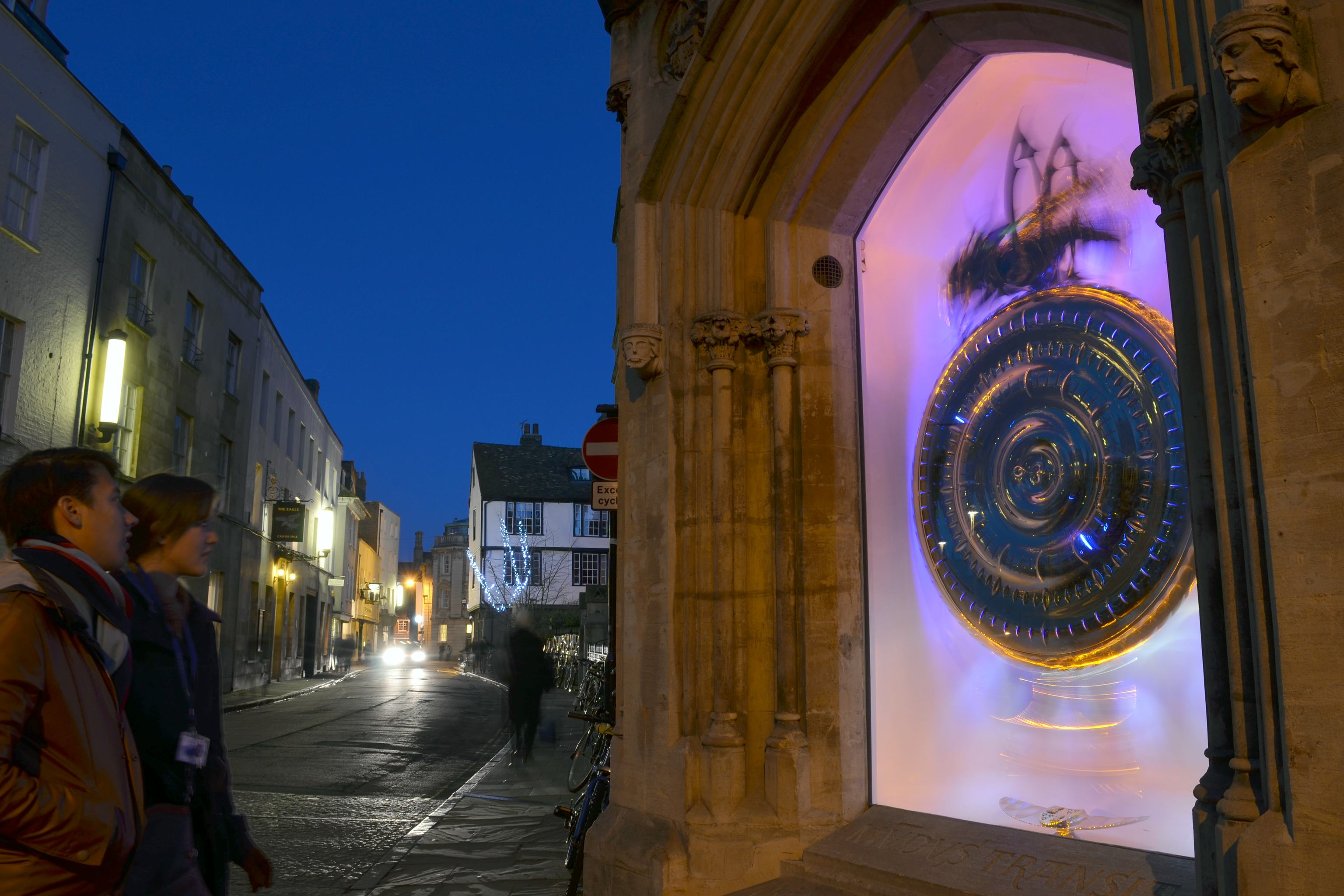
The Corpus Clock, looking east down Bene't Street at night

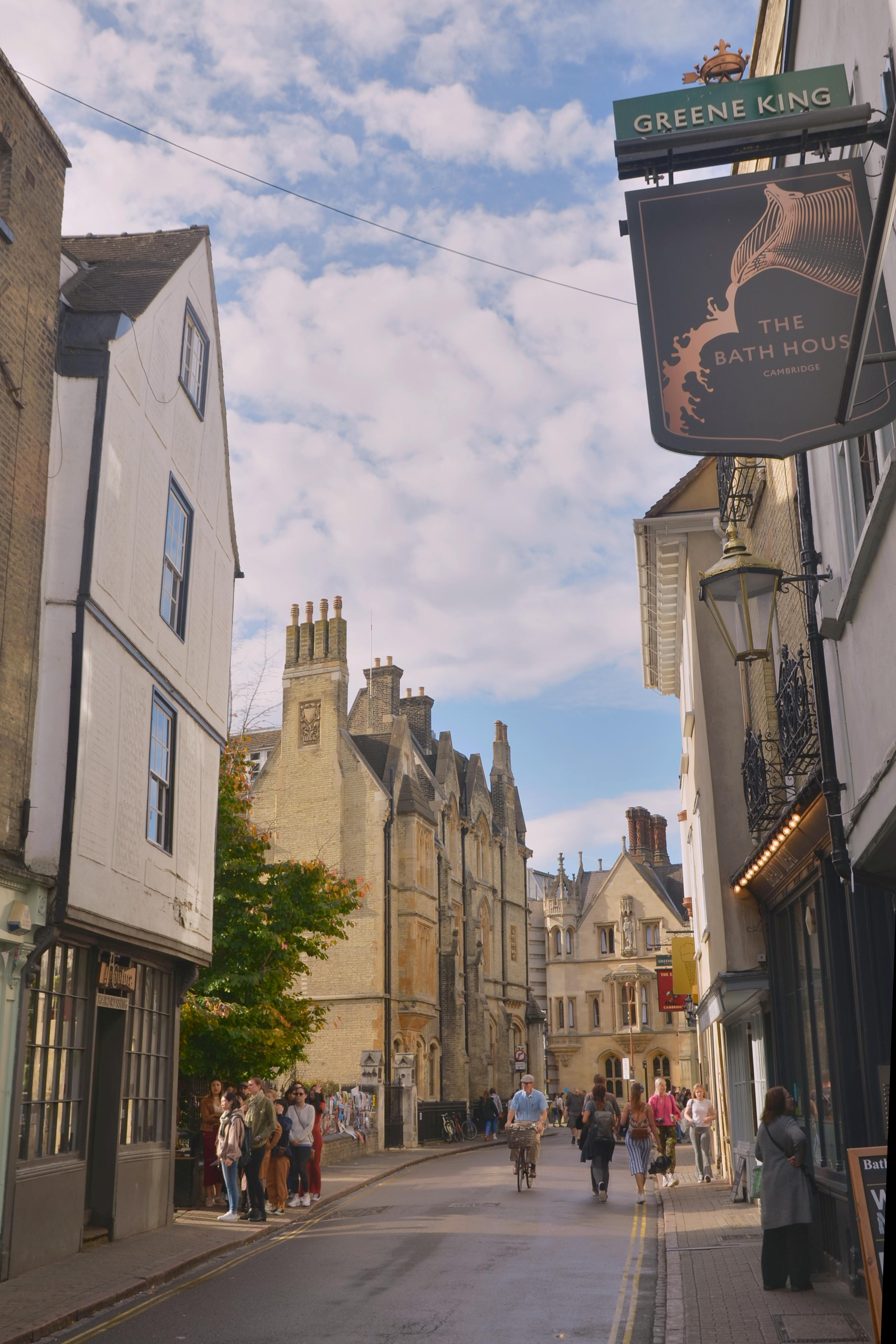
Friar House and the Bath House pub, looking west along Bene't Street
