= Reimell Ragnauth =

English cricketer (born 1975)

Personal information
- Full name: Reimell Tagenath Ragnauth
- Born: 29 March 1975 (age 51); Cambridge, Cambridgeshire, England
- Batting: Right-handed

Domestic team information
- Years: Team
- 1995–1996: Cambridge University
- 1995–1996: Cambridgeshire

Career statistics
Competition	First-class
Matches	14
Runs scored	456
Batting average	18.24
100s/50s	–/3
Top score	82
Catches/stumpings	11/–
- Source: Cricinfo, 21 July 2019

Reimell Tagenath Ragnauth (born 29 March 1975) is an English former first-class cricketer.

Ragnauth was born in March 1975 at Cambridge, where he was educated at The Perse School, before going up to Trinity Hall, Cambridge. While studying at Cambridge, he made his debut in first-class cricket for Cambridge University against Yorkshire at Fenner's in 1995. He played thirteen further first-class matches for Cambridge, the last coming in 1996 against Essex. In his fourteen first-class appearances for Cambridge, Ragnauth scored 456 runs at an average of 18.24, with a high score of 82. In addition to playing first-class cricket, he also played minor counties cricket for Cambridgeshire in 1995 and 1996, making three appearances in the Minor Counties Championship.
