= Chesterton Hall =

Historic house in Cambridge, Cambridgeshire, England

Coordinates: 52.2164°N 0.1353°E

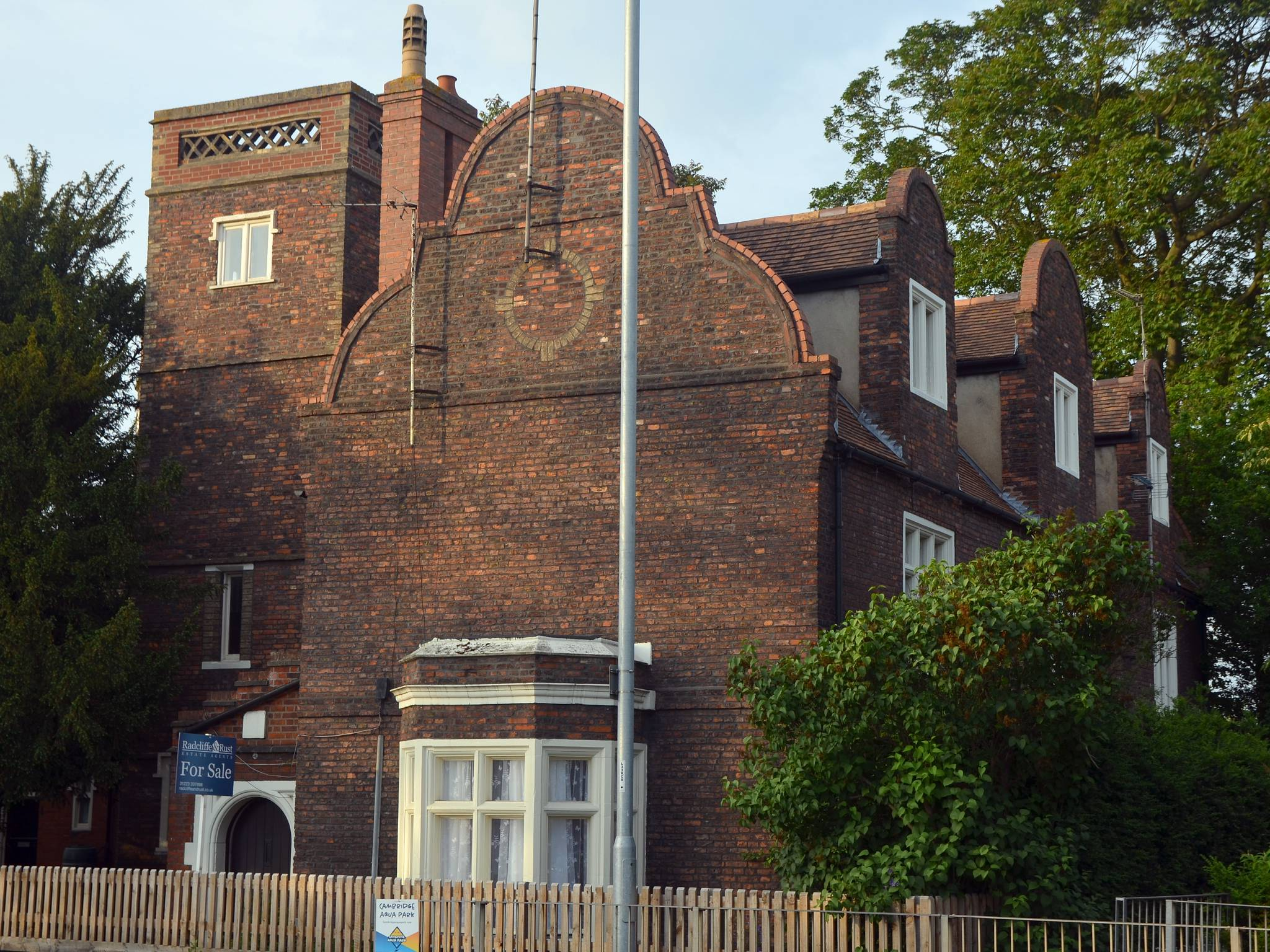
Side view of Chesterton Hall in June 2018

Chesterton Hall is a house in Chesterton, Cambridge. It lies in the city of Cambridge in the county of Cambridgeshire approximately 50 miles (80 km) north-northeast of London. Most of the grounds have long since been sold off and the house is now located on one of the major roundabouts of the city. The house dates from the early 17th century.

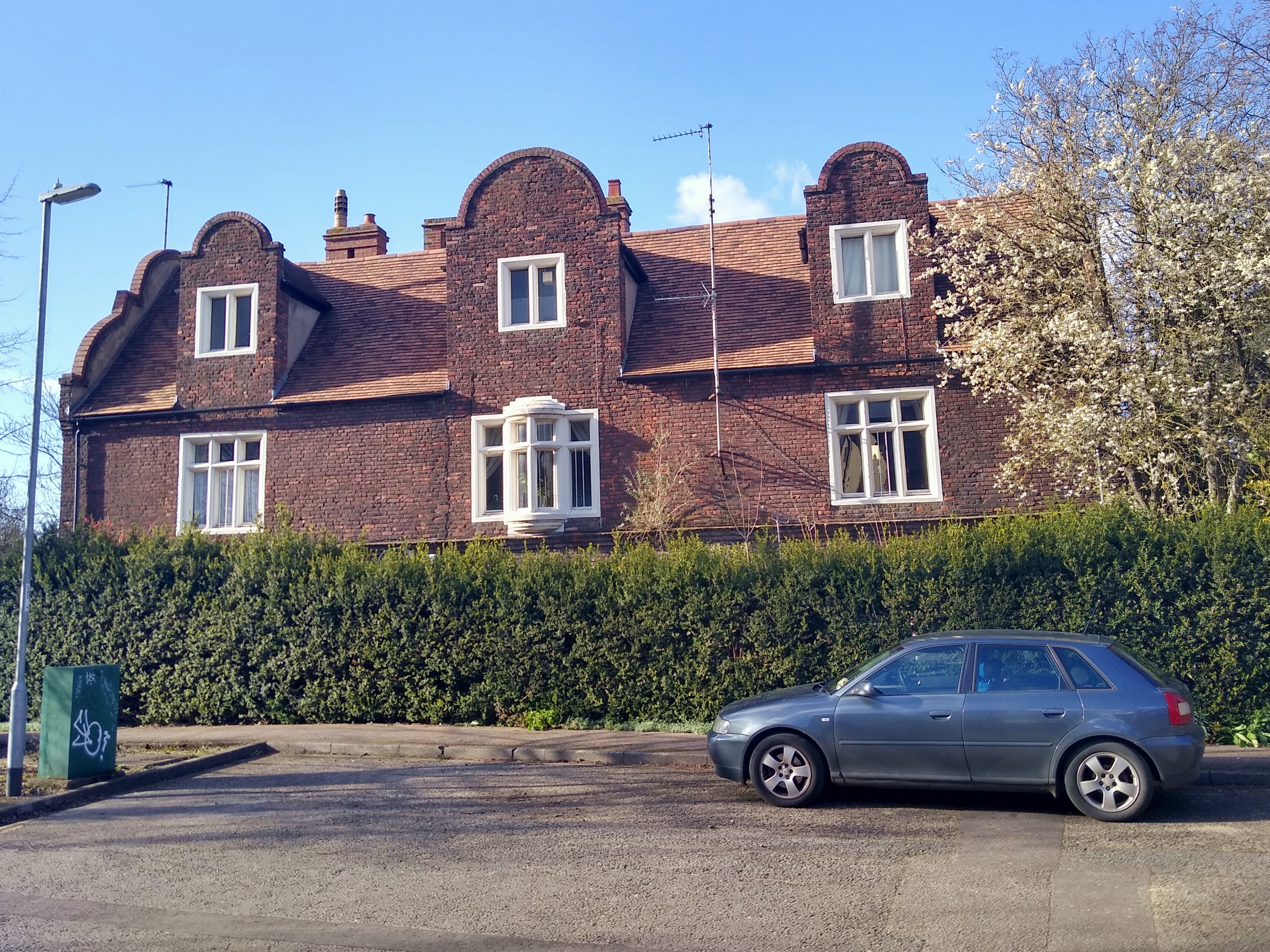
Obscured front view of Chesterton Hall in March 2021

The house was built by the Hobsons: the younger, Thomas Hobson lived at Chesterton Hall in 1627, four years prior to his death in 1631. Build of red brick, the original main south front has two storeys and three bays, with mullioned and transomed windows, including a central oriel, all their stone dressings being renewed, and above them round-gabled dormers. A north wing behind has an octagonal north-west stair tower. The house was considerably remodelled in the mid 19th century, probably by T.H. Naylor, to provide a more ornate front to the west, including a new porch and another rectangular stair tower north of the back wing. It was further enlarged after 1900.

Chesterton Hall was sold in 1799 to William Wragg, long its tenant and already a landowner at Chesterton. At his death in 1804 Wragg left the former Chettoe lands to his eldest son William (d. 1829), who devised them to his widow Mary for her life. She survived their only child, a daughter (d. 1834), and at inclosure in 1838 was allotted 328 a. for the 287 a. that she claimed. Other land had passed after 1804 to William's younger son John (d. 1823). John's son William (d. 1859), also Mary's tenant at inclosure, then owned c. 155 a. His widow Elizabeth (d. 1884) married the Cambridge lawyer T. H. Naylor, who until the late 1870s acted as patron of many village activities. William's son Capt. Francis William Wragg, of age in 1865, also inherited Mary Wragg's lands in 1866, but died without issue in 1876, (fn. 20) leaving all his property to his widow Johanna Cornelia. In 1879 she married Theodore Thomas Gurney (d. 1918). Being childless, Mrs. Wragg Gurney had already before she died in 1922 given almost all her Chesterton lands, 403 a. north-west of the village, to St. John's College, Cambridge, of which Gurney had been a fellow. The college sold much of the land for building in the 1930s, the rest after 1945. In 1945 it was acquired from St. John's College, Cambridge by the city council, which converted it into flats.

Chesterton Hall was Grade II-listed on 26 April 1950.
