= The Eagle, Cambridge =

Pub in Cambridge, England

The Eagle
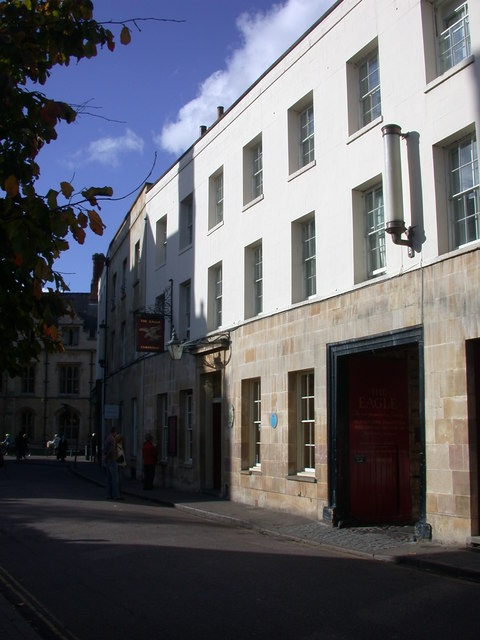
- The Bene't Street frontage looking west

- Location within Cambridgeshire

General information
- Location: Bene't Street, Cambridge, England
- Coordinates: 52.204°N 0.1182°E
- Completed: 1667

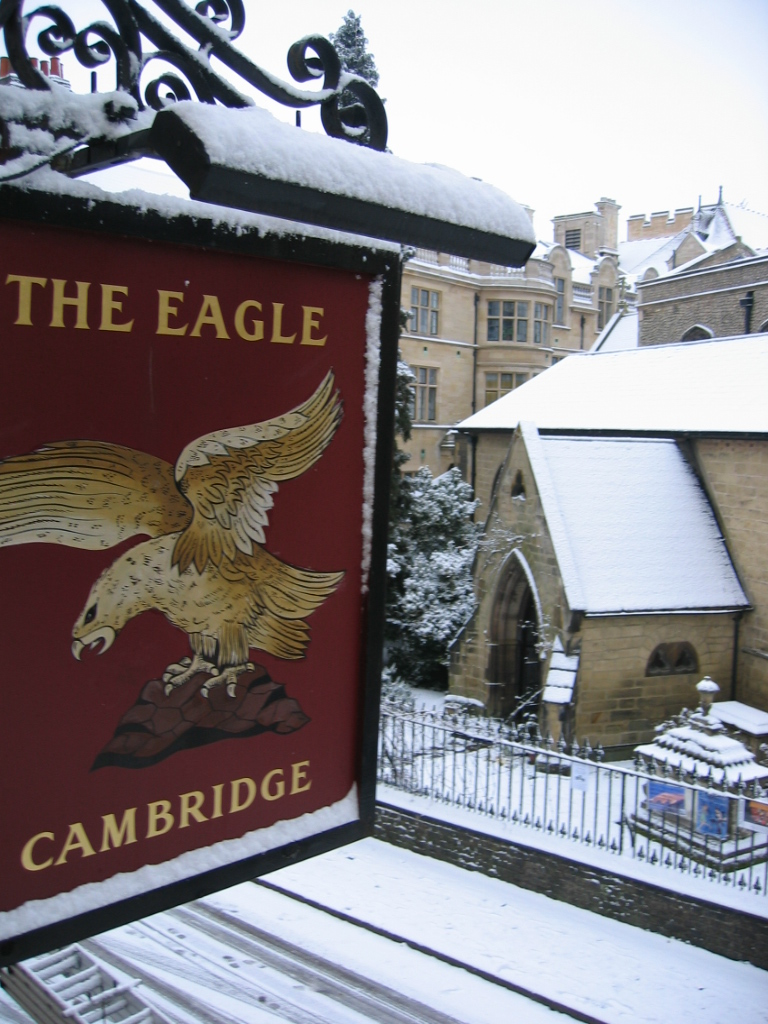
Main signboard of The Eagle, as seen from the Corpus Christi College accommodation above

The Eagle (formerly known as the Eagle and Child) is a Grade II listed public house in Cambridge, England, which opened in 1667 as a coaching inn. It is the second oldest pub in Cambridge, after the Pickerel Inn on Magdalene Street. The pub's front, on the north side of Bene't Street in the centre of the city, is of circa 1600, with a galleried 19th-century wing behind, facing the courtyard. The site is owned by Corpus Christi College and the pub is managed by Greene King brewery.

== History ==
=== Second World War ===
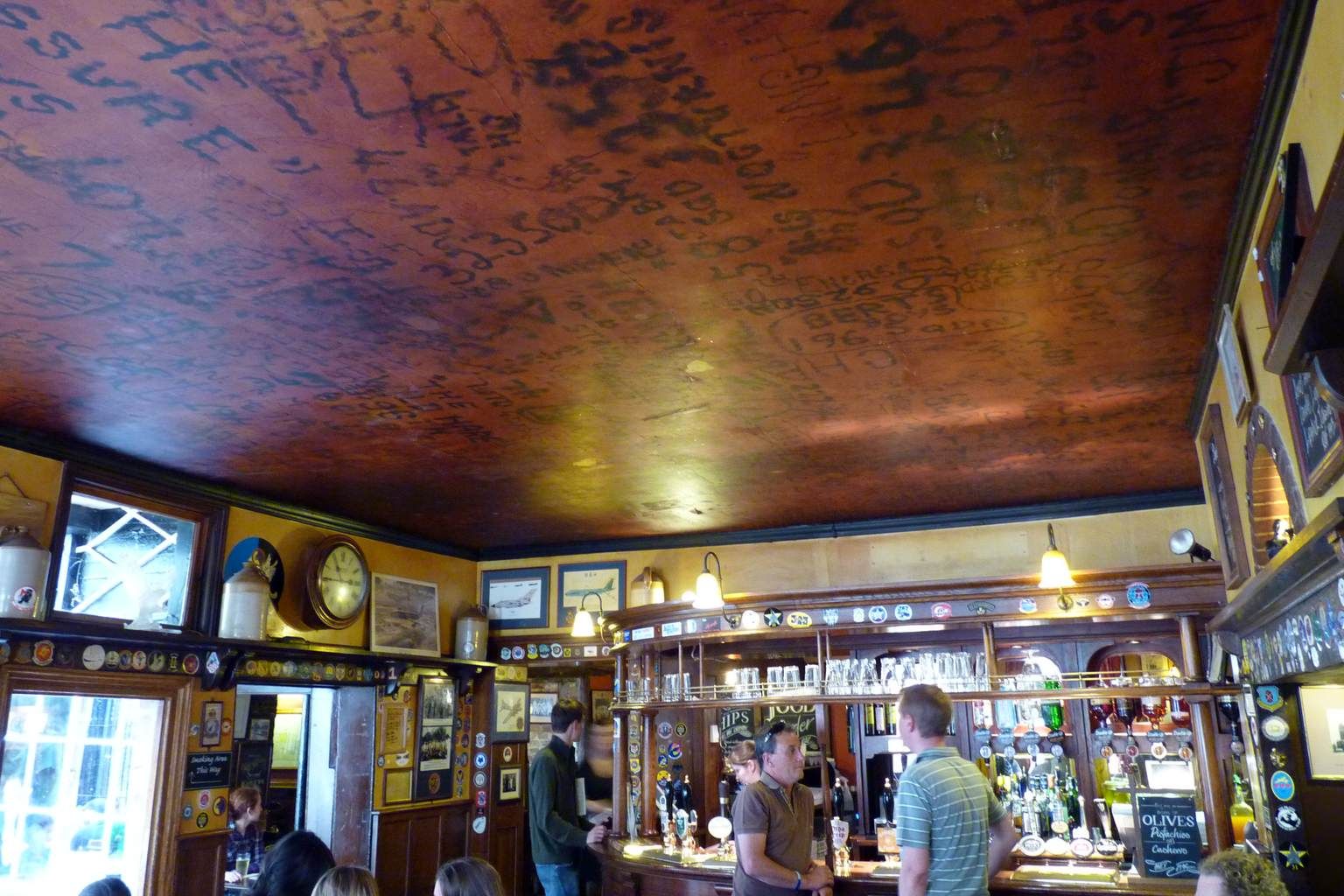
The RAF Bar ceiling with graffiti of Second World War airmen

During the Second World War, Allied airmen, who drank and socialised at The Eagle, used wax candles, petrol lighters and lipstick to write their names, squadron numbers and other doodles onto the ceiling of the rear bar. The tradition is believed to have been started by RAF Flight Sergeant P. E. Turner, who climbed up on the table one night to burn his squadron number on the ceiling. The graffiti, in what is now known as the "RAF Bar", was uncovered, deciphered and preserved by former RAF Chief Technician James Chainey during the early 1990s.

=== Announcement of the discovery of the structure of DNA ===
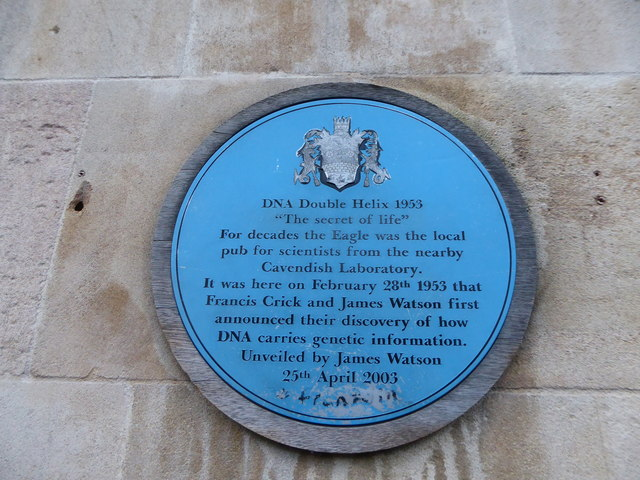
Blue plaque (now replaced) on The Eagle, with Franklin's name added at the bottom

When the university's Cavendish Laboratory was still at its old site at nearby Free School Lane, the pub was a popular lunch destination for staff working there. Thus, it became the place where Francis Crick interrupted patrons' lunchtime on 28 February 1953 to announce that he and James Watson had "discovered the secret of life" after they had come up with their proposal for the structure of DNA. The anecdote is related in Watson's book The Double Helix, and is commemorated on a blue plaque next to the entrance, and two plaques in the middle room by the table where Crick and Watson lunched regularly. Today the pub serves a special ale to commemorate the discovery, dubbed "Eagle's DNA".

The blue plaque on the exterior wall was unveiled in 2003. From 2017, Rosalind Franklin's name was often added in graffiti and removed. In 2023 the plaque was replaced with one that mentioned Franklin and Maurice Wilkins. The original plaque is in the Whipple Museum of the History of Science on Free School Lane.

Also in 1953 Watson and Crick worked over lunch in The Eagle to draw up a list of the 20 canonical amino acids. This has been a very influential rubric for molecular biology, and was a key development in understanding the protein-coding nature of DNA.
