= Stephen Perse =

English academic and philanthropist

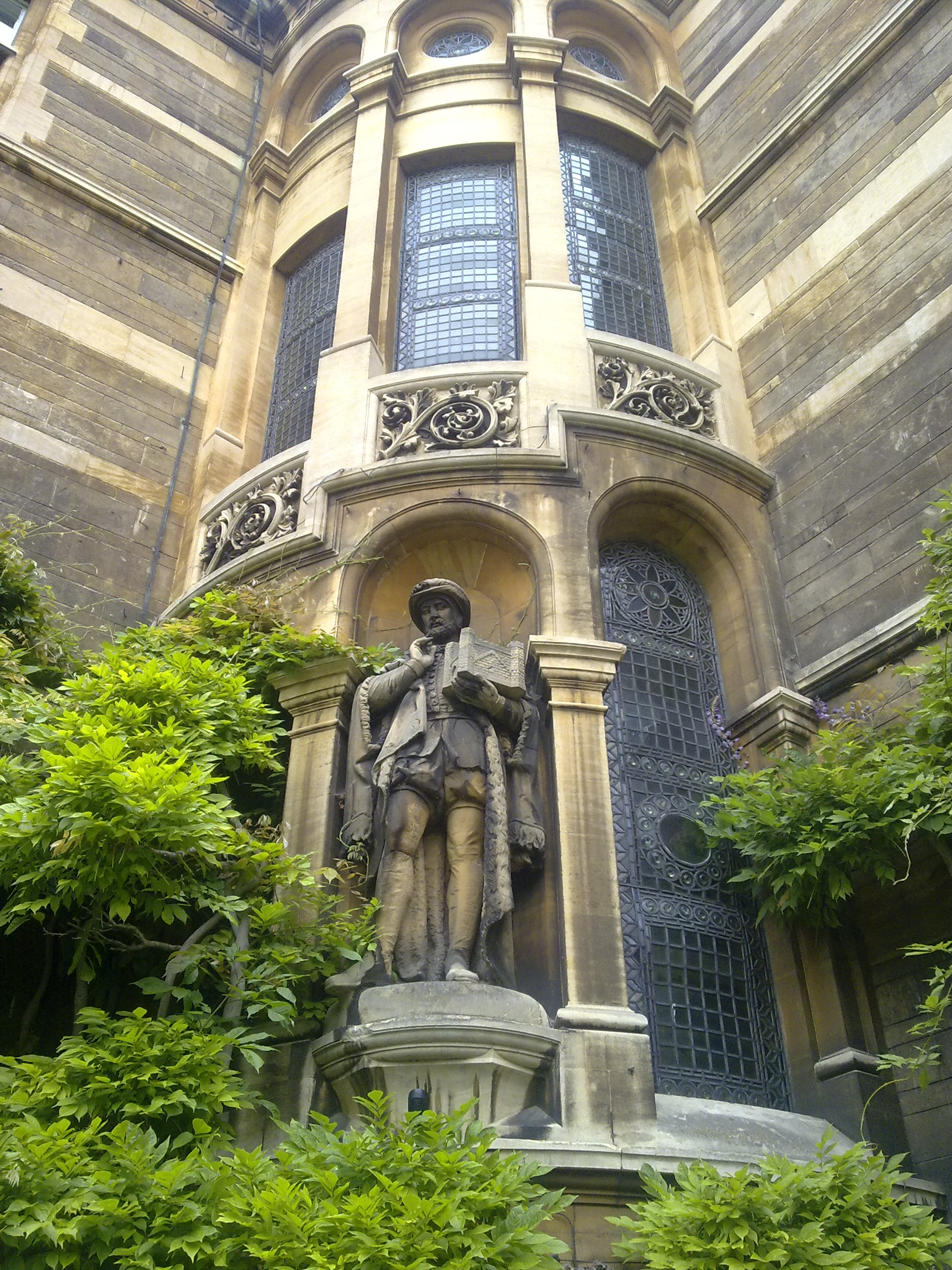
Statue of Dr Stephen Perse, Gonville and Caius College, Cambridge

Stephen Perse (1548 – 30 September 1615) was an English academic, physician and philanthropist, who founded schools that still carry his name.

== Biography ==
He was probably educated at Norwich School, and took his B.A. degree at Gonville and Caius College, Cambridge in 1569, where he was elected to a fellowship. Ordained in May 1573, as a Church of England priest and deacon, he was subsequently permitted to change his fellowship to "physick" and took the degree of Doctor of Medicine in 1581.

Perse amassed a fortune of around £10,000, probably from profits on business loans. He gave money to the University Library, for the establishment of the road now known as Maid's Causeway, and for the public water supply from the springs at Nine Wells to Cambridge along the stream known as Hobson's Conduit.

The grave of Stephen Perse is commemorated by a memorial in the Caius College chapel and he is remembered at the College's annual Perse Feast. His epitaph there reads:

Christian surnamde Stephan Perse I hight
Sole life with God alone, my crowne my light
With living God eternall life I live
This now my song: to sole God praise I give

This epitaph by me Perse was devizd
To none else my thoughts better were comprizd.

== Educational foundation ==
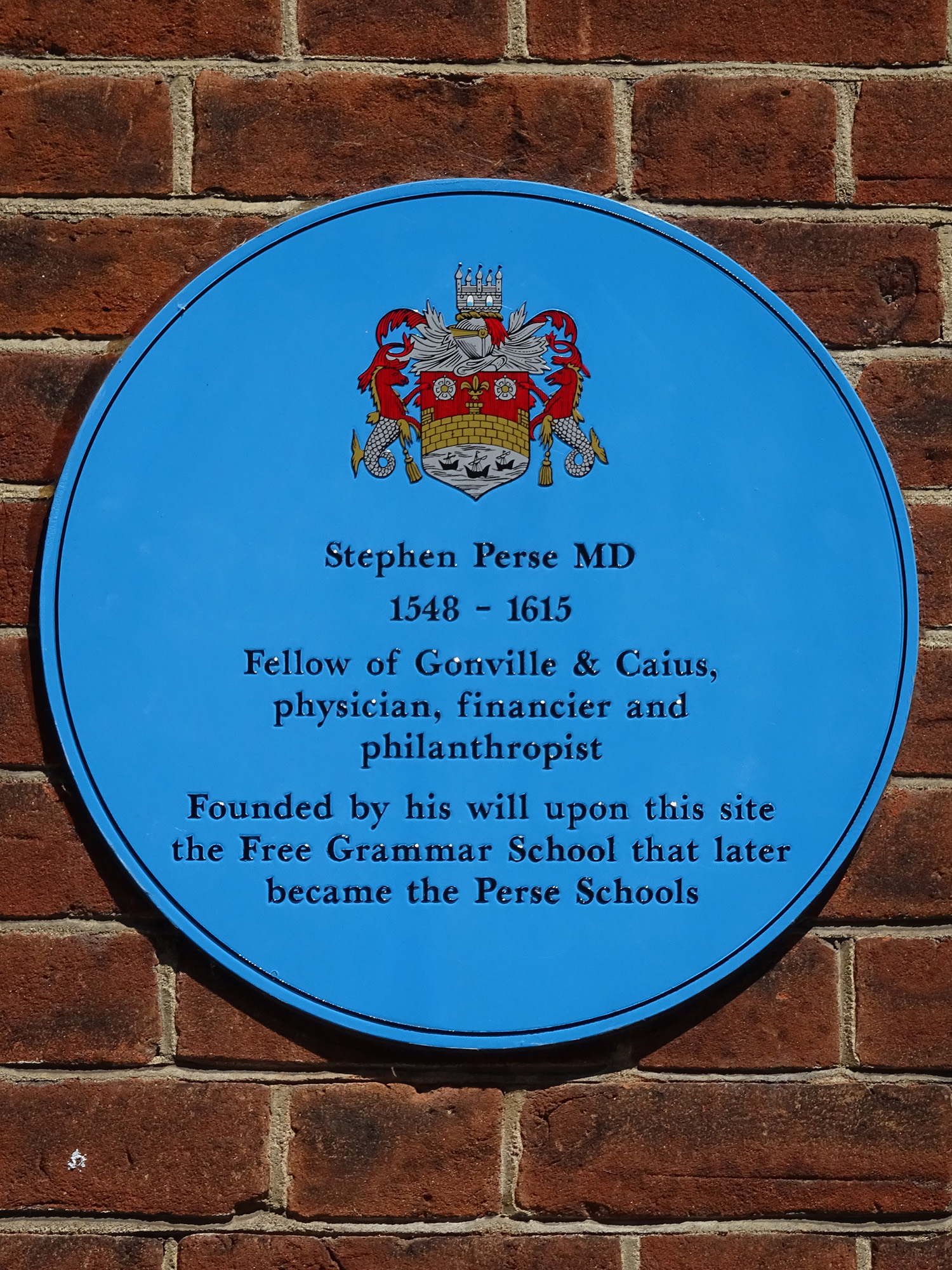
Blue plaque in Free School Lane, Cambridge

In his will, Perse gave a significant sum of money for the establishment of "a Grammar Free Schoole", and adjoining almhouses for six poor widows. The school was to teach five score scholars born in Cambridge, Barnwell, Chesterton or Trumpington, with some of the boys able to proceed to scholarships at Gonville and Caius College.

In 1615 the Perse School was founded in Cambridge. His foundation is commemorated by a blue plaque at its original site (now the Whipple Museum) in Free School Lane. The school motto is Qui facit per alium facit per se, usually taken to mean "He who does things for others does them for himself"; the Latin sentence ends "per se" in a word play on the founder's name. In 1881, the Perse School for Girls was established, now part of the Stephen Perse Foundation.
