= Hobson's Conduit =

Water supply channel in Cambridge, England

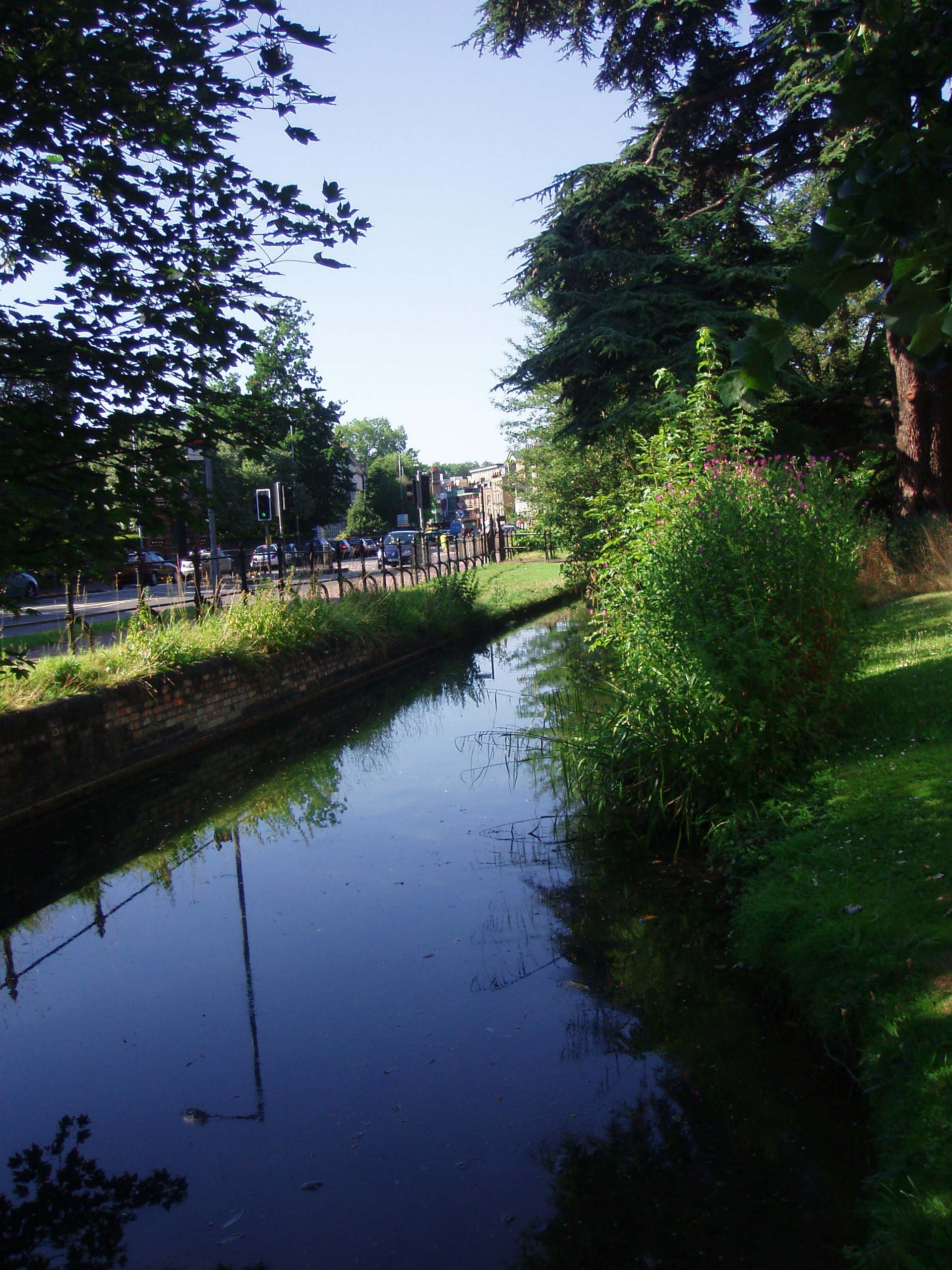
Hobson's Conduit as it runs alongside Cambridge University Botanic Garden on Trumpington Road.

Hobson's Conduit, also called Hobson's Brook, is a watercourse that was built from 1610 to 1614 by Thomas Hobson and others to bring fresh water into the city of Cambridge, England from springs at Nine Wells, a Local Nature Reserve (52.166°N 0.1349°E), near the village of Great Shelford. It is now a Scheduled Ancient Monument and historical relic. The watercourse currently runs overground until Cambridge University Botanic Garden and Brookside, where it is at its widest. At the corner of Lensfield Road stands a hexagonal monument to Hobson, which once formed part of the market square fountain, and was moved to this location in 1856, after a fire in the Market. The flow of water runs under Lensfield Road, and subsequently runs along both sides of Trumpington Street in broad gutters towards Peterhouse and St Catharine's College, and also St Andrew's Street. The conduit currently ends at Silver Street.

The scheme was first devised in 1574 by Andrew Perne, Master of Peterhouse, who proposed that a stream be diverted from Nine Wells chalk springs through the town and the King's Ditch to improve sanitation. The design was revived by James Montagu, Master of Sidney Sussex College and built at the expense of the University and town. Although Thomas Hobson was just one of those involved in the construction he endowed a Hobson's Conduit Trust to deal with maintenance of the waterway, which still exists today. The new river was dug from Vicar's Brook near Long Road to the conduit head at the end of Lensfield Road as a joint venture between the University and the city. Here the flow of water was divided into four separate branches for different uses.

== Hobson's Brook from Nine Wells to the conduit head ==
Portion of an 1886 ordnance survey map showing the overground course of Hobson's Conduit and Vicar's Brook

Hobson's Conduit was originally formed by diverting the water from Vicar's Brook. From its source in chalkland springs at Nine Wells, near Great Shelford, this stream flows east of Trumpington under bridges on Long Road and Trumpington Road until reaching Coe Fen, where it forms the first tributary of the River Cam above Cambridge. The man-made channel Hobson's Brook branches off from Vicar's Brook between the two bridges and initially runs parallel to Vicar's Brook, enclosing a stretch of common ground, now used for allotments. A public footpath, formerly known as Finch's or Senior Wrangler's Walk, follows this portion of the watercourse. The stream widens as it skirts the western boundary of the University Botanic Gardens until passing under Bateman Street. In the last portion before the conduit head at Lensfield Road, where it divides into four branches, the channel flows between Brookside and Trumpington Street through gardens enclosed by 19C wrought iron railings.

== Trumpington Street branch ==
The original branch still functions as sluices along Trumpington Street, where it is known as the Pem (east side) and Pot (west side). The City Council's Drainage Engineer controls flow through the sluices and generally lets water flow in the open conduits in Trumpington Street between April and September. Feeds run into Peterhouse and Pembroke Colleges. A run also used to feed into the basement of the old Addenbrooke's Hospital, which became the location of the Judge Institute by 1995.

== Market Place branch ==
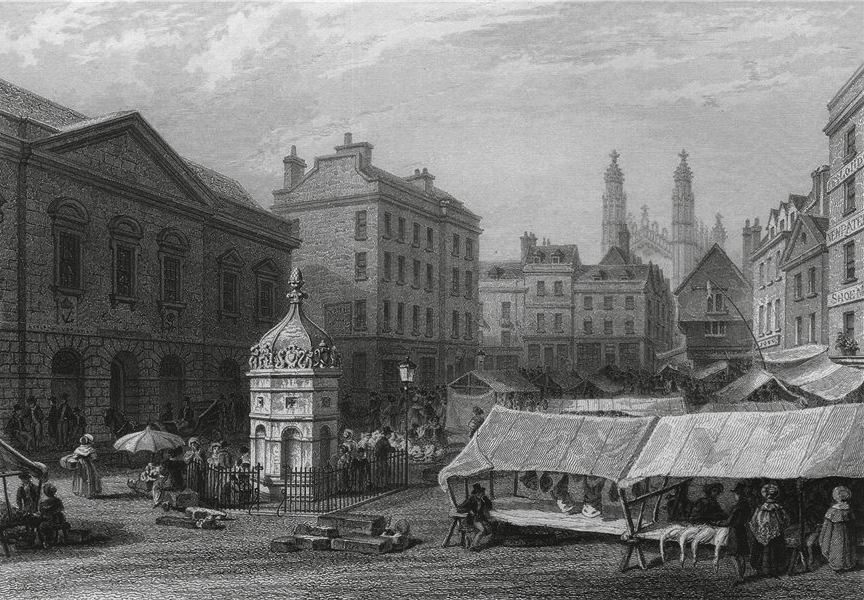
1841 engraving showing the original Market fountain

Completed in 1614, this branch brought fresh water to the Market fountain in the centre of the Cambridge Market Place. Following a fire in 1849, the Market Square was redeveloped and in 1855 a Gothic Revival gabled fountain was erected (marked on many contemporary maps as "lavatory" as there were underground public conveniences here) and the original fountain was partly moved to form the monument in Lensfield Road, and the remainder demolished. Most of the Victorian fountain was pulled down in 1953.

Flow to this branch was cut off in 1970 during construction of the Lion Yard development and has never been restored.

== St Andrew's Street branch ==
Added in 1631, this branch flowed from the conduit head along Lensfield Road and St Andrew's Street toward Drummer Street where it split into feeds that ran into Christ's and Emmanuel Colleges as well as a public dipping point. Much of the open conduit along St Andrew's Street was covered in 1996 as part of pedestrian improvements.

== Parker's Piece branch ==
A final branch ran from the conduit head toward Parker's Piece to feed a cattle pond, but this was disrupted in 1827 when the pond was filled in.

== Monuments ==
There are two monuments, one on Lensfield Road (52.1979°N 0.1224°E, see picture below) and one at Nine Wells. The latter was erected in 1861 by public subscription and records the benefactors to the water course and conduit as:

- Thomas Chaplin, Lord of the Manor of Trumpington Delapole, 1610
- Stephen Perse, fellow of Gonville and Caius, 1615
- Thomas Hobson, carrier, 1630
- Edward Potto, alderman of Cambridge, 1632, and
- Joseph Merrill, alderman of Cambridge, 1806
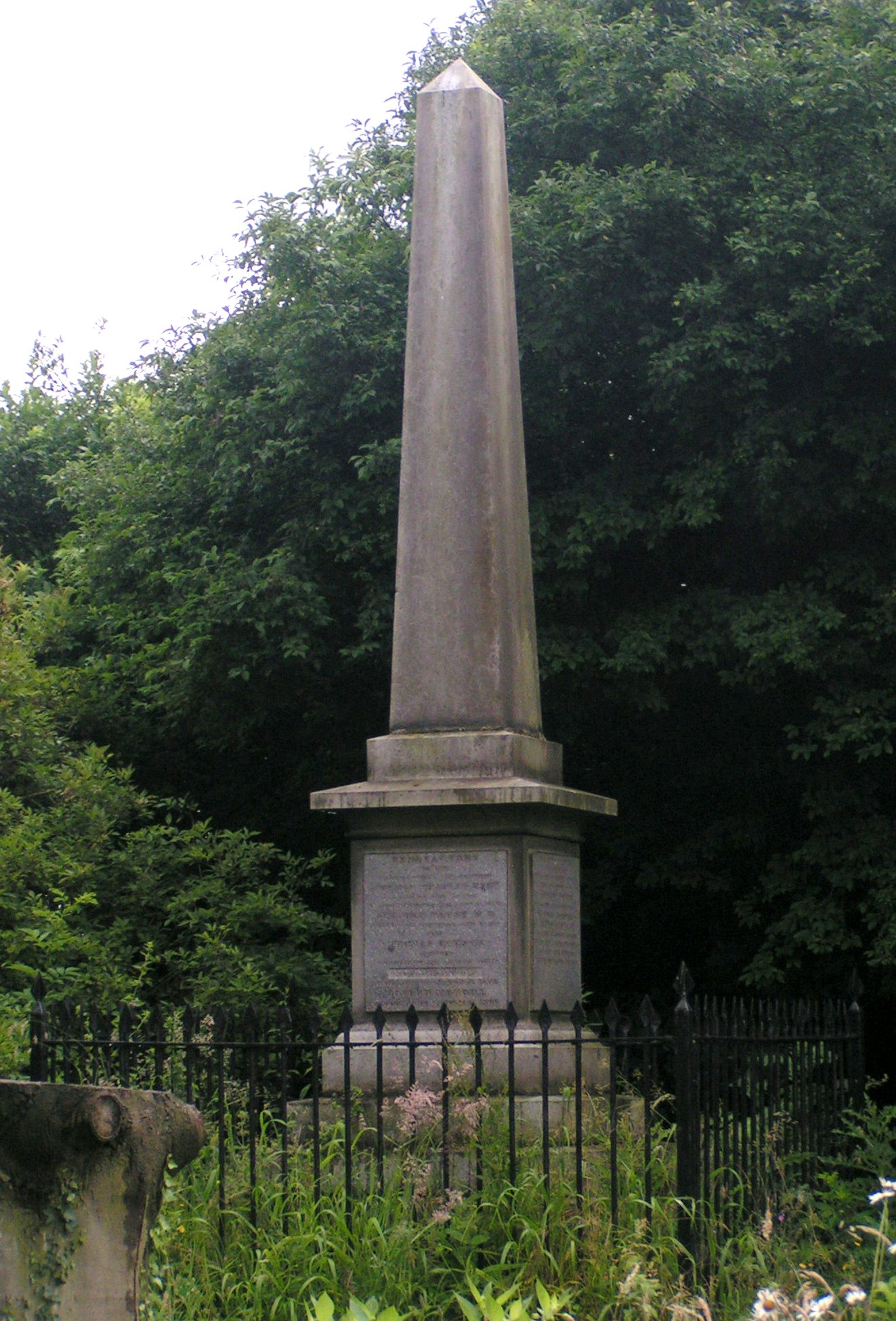
Monument to the conduit at Nine Wells

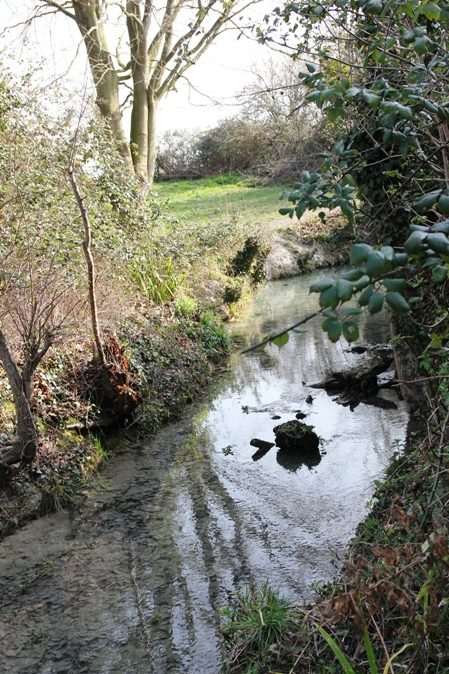
Spring at Nine Wells that feeds the conduit

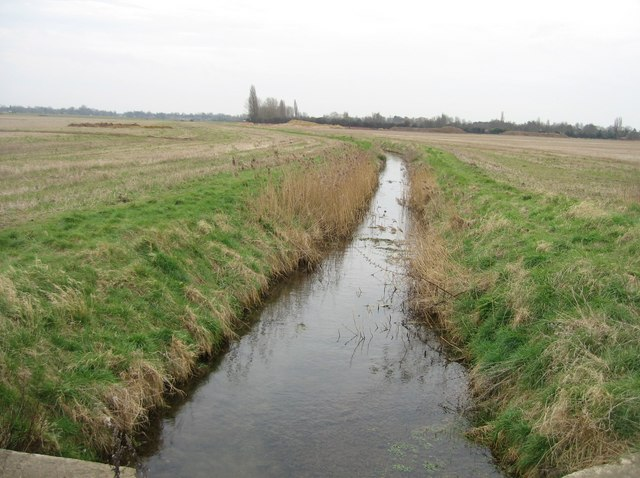
View along the conduit towards Nine Wells

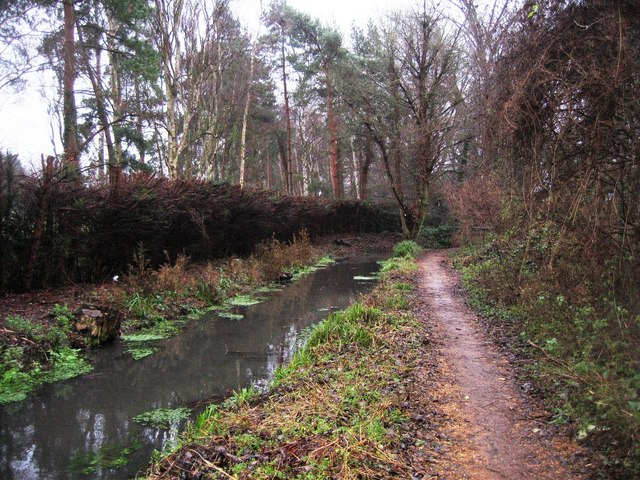
Footpath along conduit between Brooklands Avenue and Long Road

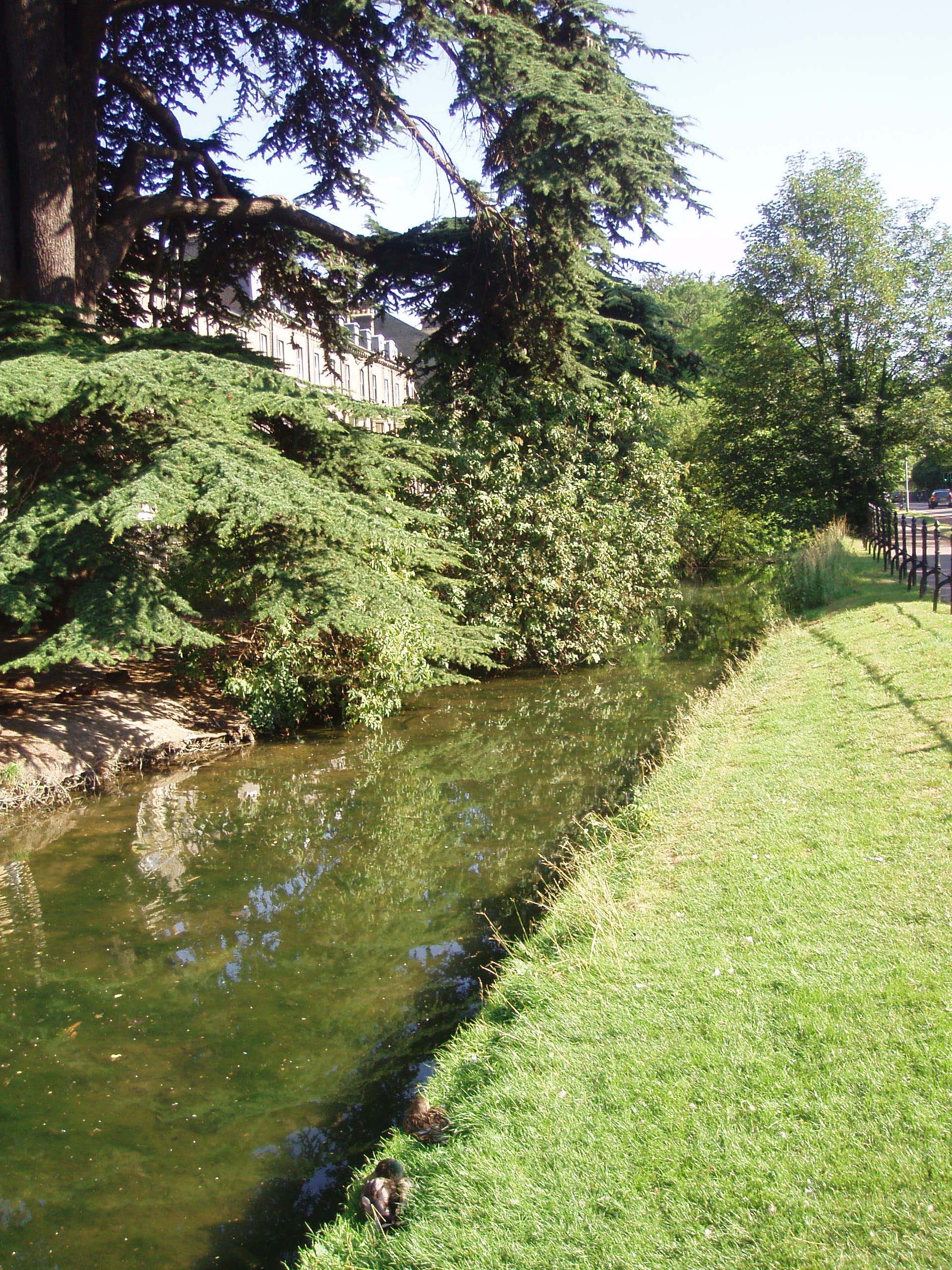
Hobson's conduit at the end of Brookside

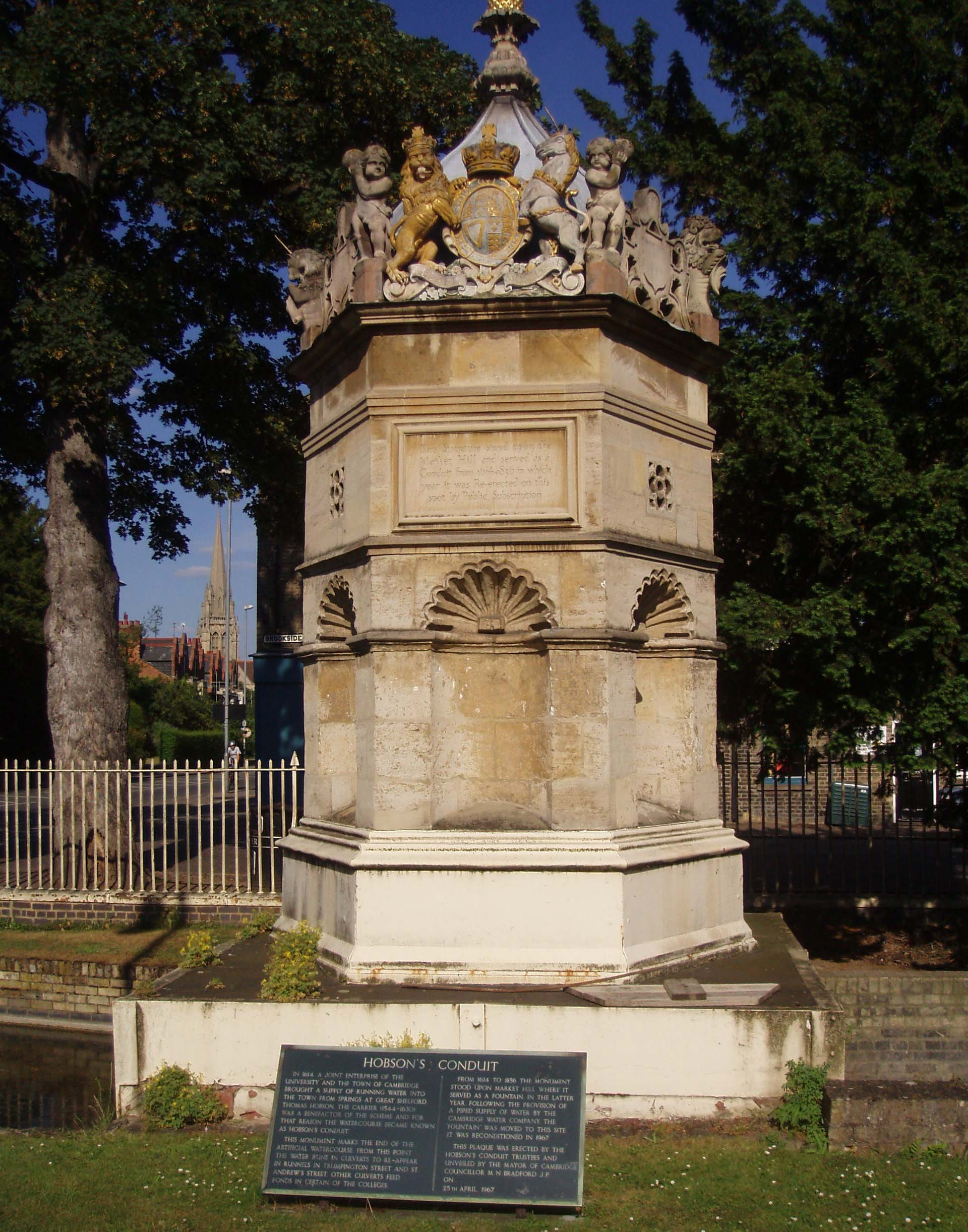
The Market fountain reerected at the point where the conduit crosses Lensfield Road as a monument to Hobson

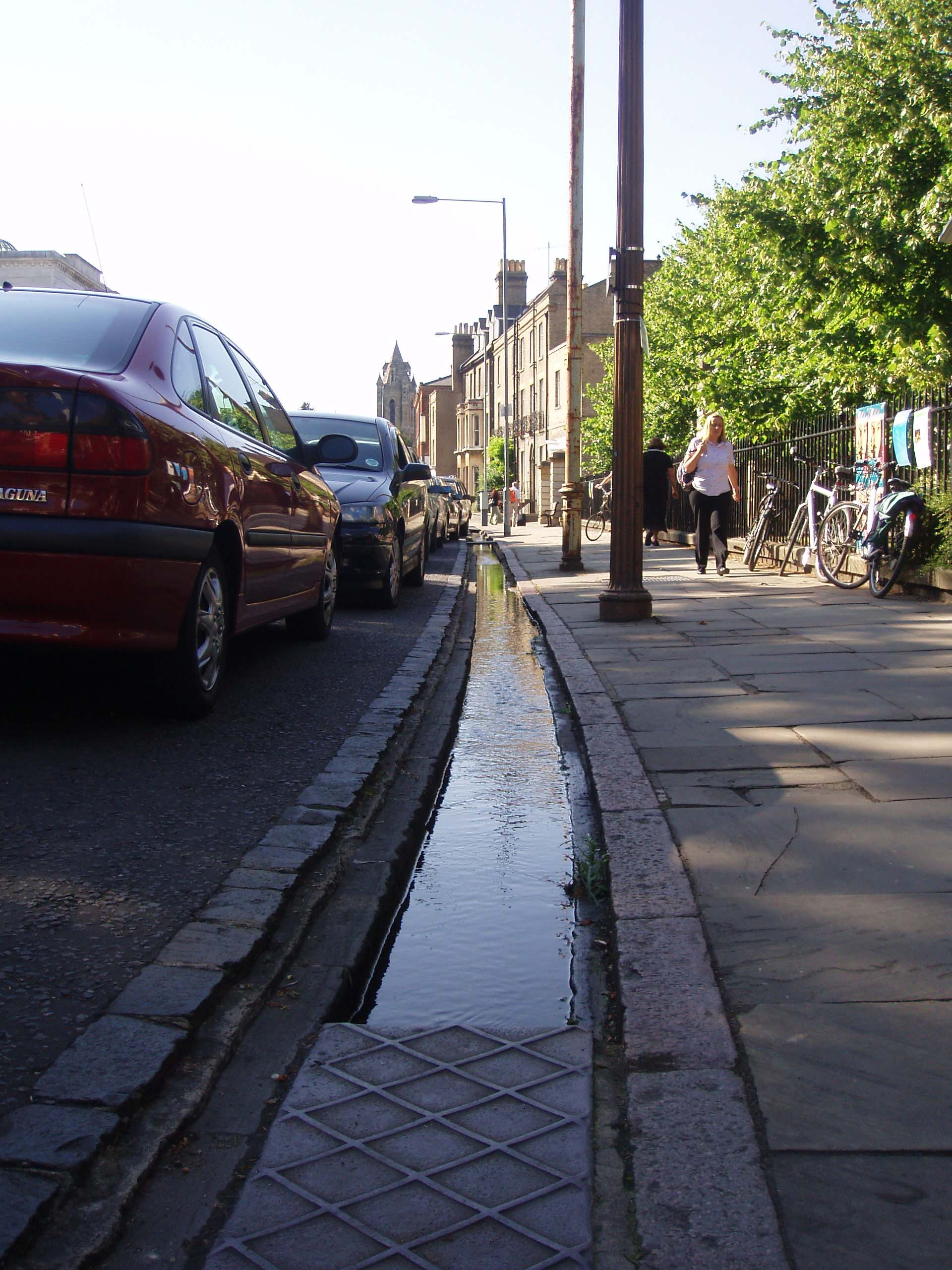
Hobson's conduit as it runs in a sluice toward Peterhouse
