= Nine Wells =

Park in United Kingdom

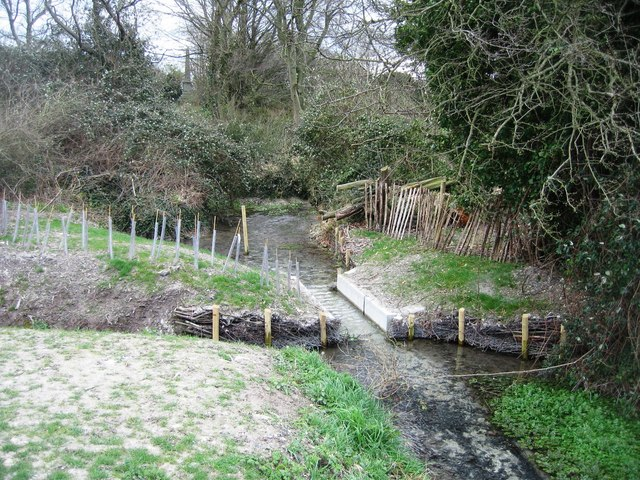
- Interactive map of Nine Wells
- Type: Local Nature Reserve
- Location: Trumpington, Cambridgeshire
- OS grid: TL 461 542
- Area: 1.2 hectares (3.0 acres)
- Manager: Cambridge City Council

Nine Wells is a 1.2 hectare (3 acres) Local Nature Reserve east of Trumpington, on the southern outskirts of Cambridge. It is owned and managed by Cambridge City Council.

The site is a small area of woodland surrounded by agricultural land. Multiple springs issue from the base of a chalk hill, and feed Hobson's Conduit, the watercourse that was built between 1610 and 1614 by Thomas Hobson and other benefactors to bring fresh water into the city of Cambridge. There are four main springheads linked by stream channels, as well as innumerable minor fissures, that issue water at a constant 10.2 °C.

== History ==
Location of King's Ditch overlaid on a modern map

In 1265 a defensive channel known as 'the king's ditch' was excavated around the city of Cambridge. By the early 17th century this ditch had become an open sewer. In 1574 Andrew Perne DD, Master of Peterhouse, thought of constructing a channel to bring water to the ditch. Hobson's Conduit, constructed from 1610, used the natural springs at Nine Wells to create a flow of water to the city and flush the kings ditch. This was not only successful in sanitising the city but it became the principal water supply for Cambridge for over 250 years. Water continues to flow into the city and waters the lake in the Botanic Garden.

== Plant species ==
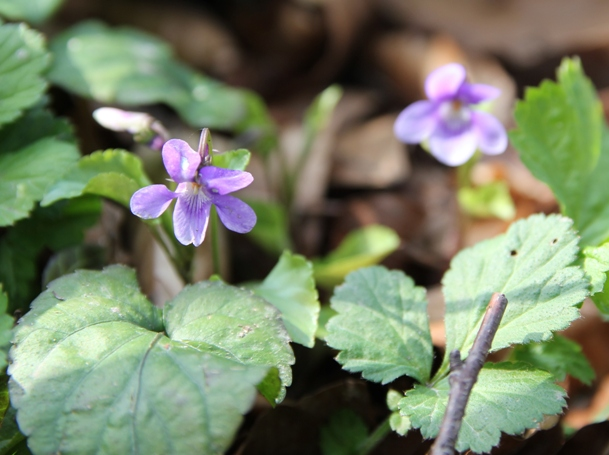
Sweet violets at Nine Wells, April 2016

The dominant trees here are beech which were originally planted for firewood but have a detrimental effect on the watercourses: an acidic leaf fall in autumn is causing heavy silting and a change in oxygen levels. The hedgerow that encloses the reserve was planted following the Great Shelford Inclosure Act 1834 (4 & 5 Will. 4. c. 3 Pr.) and comprises native species like hawthorn, spindle and field maple.

A survey determined that 108 plant species grow here and the area contains numerous mature ash trees as well as blackthorn. Scented sweet violets (Viola odorata) and bluebells bloom here early in the year, and later there are cowslips and deadly nightshade.

== Aquatic wildlife ==
It was created a biological Site of Special Scientific Interest because a range of relic aquatic invertebrates bred here. The flatworms Planaria cornuta and P. alpina were found here and had survived from the last glacial period. Another relic species was a trichopteran (caddisfly), Agapetus fuscipes. However the drought of 1976 together with increased water abstraction caused some extinctions and Nine Wells lost its SSSI status.

Efforts are being made to recreate conditions favourable to re-establishing a richer invertebrate fauna again, however there is a great deal of new building going on in the area so this special little habitat patch is potentially under threat. According to the information boards within the reserve, active management is needed to keep the streams suitable for bullhead fish to thrive and this is important as they provide food for kingfishers. Falling beech leaves need to be cleared from the streams to stop the water from becoming too acidic.

== Terrestrial species ==
These woods are home to species including chaffinch, robin, yellowhammer, greenfinch, blackbird and, during the summer, chiffchaff. The site is an important refuge for birds, with sparrowhawk (Accipitier nisus), green woodpecker (Picus viridis), long-tailed tit (Aegithalos caudatus), bullfinch (Pyrrhula pyrrhula) and redwing (Turdus iliacus) recorded as well as a good variety of small species. This is also a good site for butterflies including peacocks and brimstones (Gonepteryx).

== Monument ==
Within the Reserve there is a monument to Hobson's Conduit which was erected in 1861 by public subscription and records the benefactors to the watercourse and conduit as:

- Thomas Chaplin, Lord of the Manor of Trumpington Delapole, 1610
- Stephen Perse, fellow of Gonville and Caius, 1615
- Thomas Hobson, carrier, 1630
- Edward Potto, alderman of Cambridge, 1632
- Joseph Merrill, alderman of Cambridge, 1806

The obelisk is a Grade II listed building.

== Location ==
It is south of Addenbrooke's Hospital and east of the railway line and the genome cycle track (52.16645°N 0.13517°E), near the village of Great Shelford.

== Gallery ==
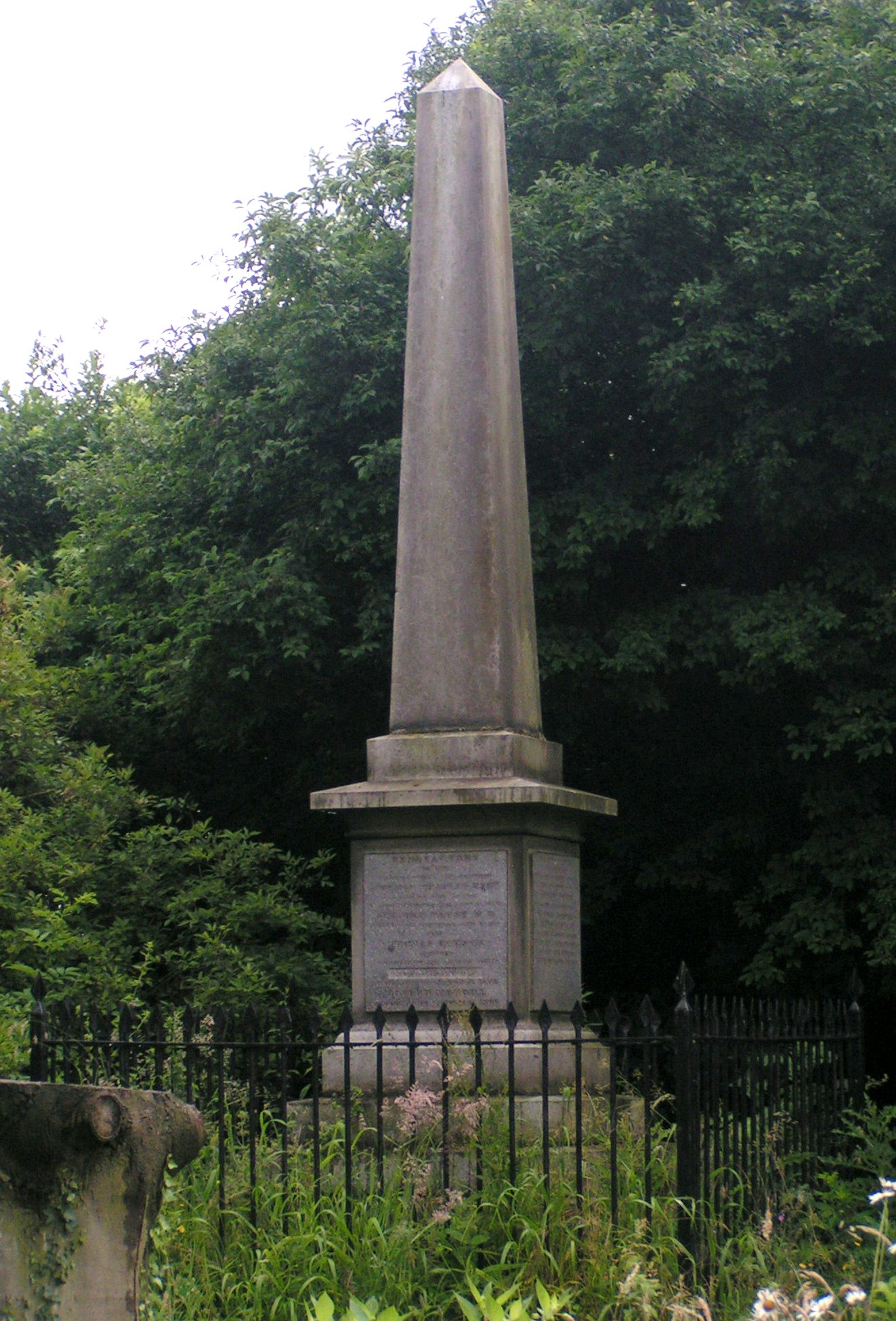
Monument to Hobson's Conduit at Nine Wells

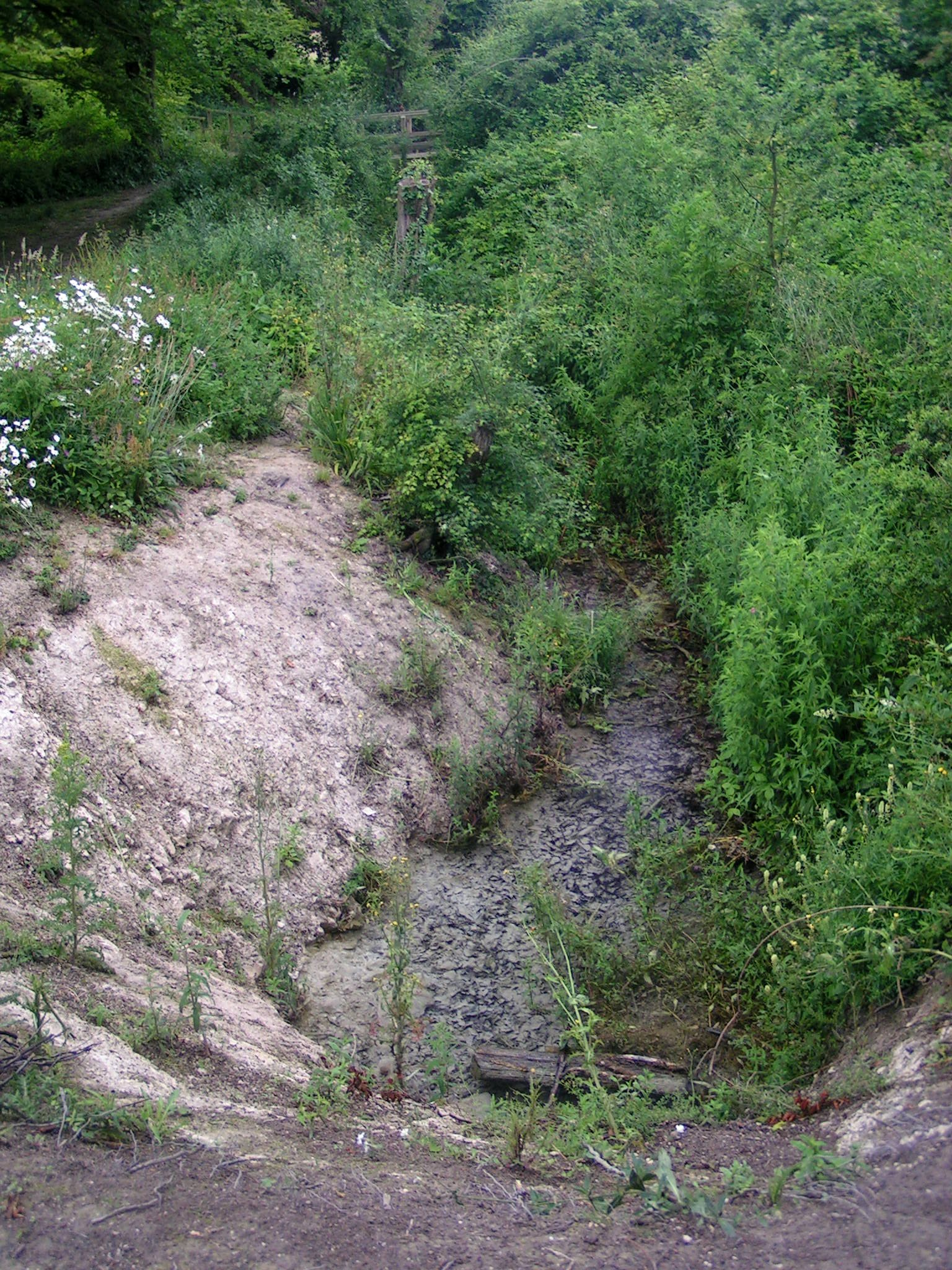
Spring at Nine Wells that feeds Hobson's Conduit

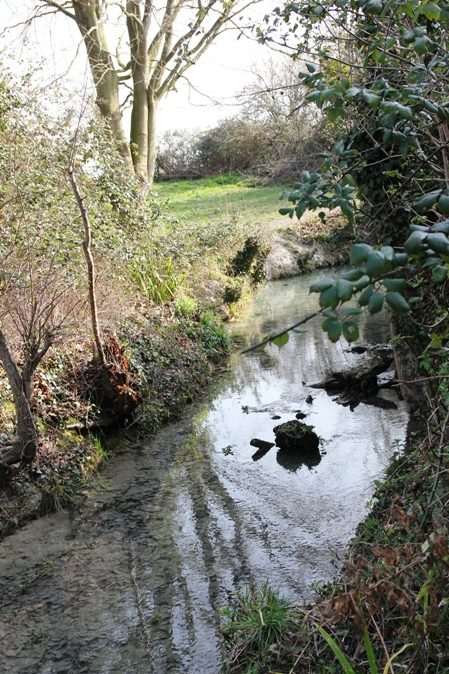
One of four springs at Nine Wells, April 2016

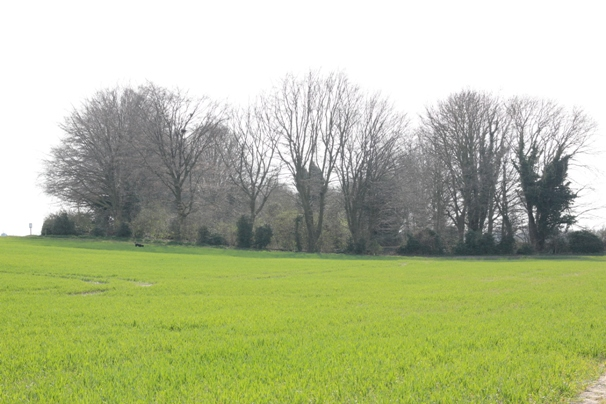
Nine Wells woods at their narrowest, looking from the north-east

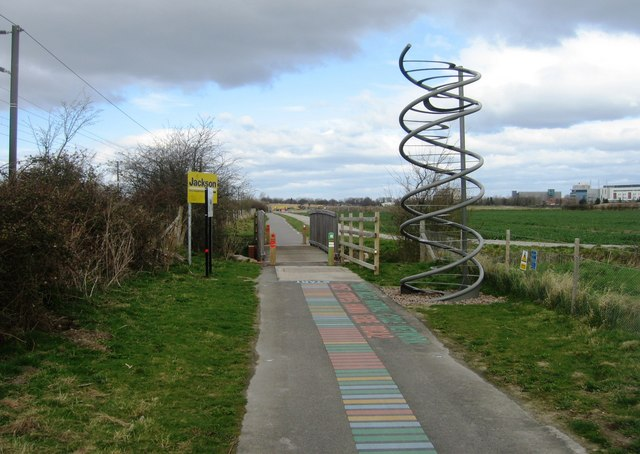
Double helix sculpture where National Cycle Route 11 meets track along Hobson's Brook to Nine Wells
