= The Perse School =

Public school in Cambridge, England

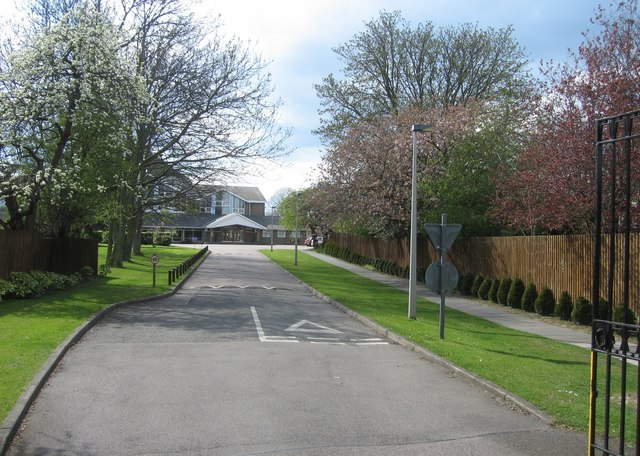
- The school's coat of arms and road entrance

Location
- Hills Road; Cambridge, Cambridgeshire, CB2 8QF; England; 52°10′51″N 00°08′19″E

Information
- Type: Public school Private day school
- Motto: Latin: Qui facit per alium facit per se (He who does things for others does them for himself)
- Religious affiliation: Nondenominational Christian
- Established: 1615; 411 years ago
- Founder: Stephen Perse
- Department for Education URN: 110923 Tables
- Chairman of the Governing Body: Jonathan W Scott
- Head: Edward Elliott
- Staff: 138 teaching, 117 support staff, 26 peripatetics
- Gender: Co-educational
- Age: 3 to 18
- Enrolment: 1,564 (2016)
- Houses: 8
- Colours: Purple and black
- Publication: OP News Magazine
- Alumni: Old Perseans
- Website: http://www.perse.co.uk/

The Perse School is a private school (English fee-charging day and, in the case of the Perse, a former boarding school) in Cambridge, England. Founded in 1615 by Stephen Perse, its motto is Qui facit per alium facit per se, taken to mean "He who does things for others does them for himself". The Perse School took girls for Sixth form only from 1994, began accepting girls at 11 and 13+ in September 2010 and was fully co-educational by September 2012. 'Perse' is a member of the Headmasters' and Headmistresses' Conference, an association of UK independent schools.

The organisation now comprises three schools, which together provide for children aged 3 through to 18. The Pelican is the Perse's nursery and pre-preparatory school, and accommodates pupils from 3–7. It is situated on Glebe Road, close to the main school site. Preparatory education for students aged 7 to 11 years old is provided by the Perse Prep, which is located close to the Upper School, just north of the junction of Long Road and Trumpington Road. In Year 7 pupils usually progress to the Upper School, where they sit GCSE examinations and A-Levels.

== History ==
The school was founded in 1615 at its original site in Free School Lane, Cambridge. Its former buildings now house the Whipple Museum of the History of Science. In 1890 it moved to a site on the corner of Gonville Place and Hills Road, in 1960 moving to the site it now occupies as its 'Upper' school on Hills Road. There have been multiple phases of expansion, particularly in the 21st century. Among notable developments is the Peter Hall Performing Arts Centre, a 400-seat theatre, exhibition and rehearsal space designed by architects Haworth Tompkins, which opened in 2018.

An old prospectus lists the fees as £3 per term in 1890., equivalent to ca. £1500 in 2026 money.

From 1945 to 1976 it was a direct grant grammar school, offering free places to 40% of pupils. Following the abolition of the Assisted Places Scheme, The Perse no longer received any state funding and became independent.

The school was ranked 13th in the Sunday Times Parent Power league table in 2019 and 6th in the Daily Telegraph national table of A Level, Pre-U and IB results with 83% A* and A grades from 175 candidates. In 2021, The Sunday Times also named the Perse School as the top independent secondary school in East Anglia, as the school had the best performance in the GCE A Level Examinations in the region.

In 2015, two boys from the school were convicted of stealing items found at Auschwitz while on a school trip.

== Motto ==
The school motto is Qui facit per alium facit per se, usually taken to mean "He who does things for others does them for himself". This is an example of a rebus motto, the Latin sentence ending in a word play on the founder's name "per se" and his benefaction. A blue plaque dedicated to the school's founder, Dr Stephen Perse, was installed in Free School Lane, Cambridge.

== Competitions, Olympiads and scholarships ==
Pupils have competed and scored highly in academic competitions and Olympiads, in addition to winning awards including Arkwright Engineering Scholarships and Nuffield Research Placements (previously Nuffield Science Bursaries). Students have won scholarships for summer placements at the Weizmann Institute of Science in Israel and research institutes in Heidelberg, Germany.

British competition results include:

- First place in the Pi Wars robot competition
- First place in the Schools' Challenge general knowledge competition
- First place (winning the Trinity College prize) in the National Cipher Challenge
- First place in the Bank of England Target Two Point Zero interest rate challenge
- Invitation to the British Physics Olympiad presentation afternoon (top 4 in the country in the AS Challenge)
- Qualifying for the UKMT Team Maths Challenge final (winning the poster competition)
- Qualifying for the British Informatics Olympiad final (top 15 in the country)
- Qualifying for Round 2 (top 20 to 25 in the country) of the UK Chemistry Olympiad
- Scoring Gold in Round 1 of United Kingdom Linguistics Olympiad

Students have also competed in international competitions including the International Mathematical Olympiad, the Balkan Mathematical Olympiad, the European Girls' Mathematical Olympiad, the Romanian Master of Mathematics competition, the International Biology Olympiad, the International Olympiad in Informatics, the International Linguistics Olympiad, the International Olympiad on Astronomy and Astrophysics, the International Rocketry Challenge, the European Union Contest for Young Scientists and the Intel International Science and Engineering Fair.

== Innovation ==
In 2018, the Perse School partnered with a Cambridge-based education technology entrepreneur, Rob Percival, to support the creation of an online artificial intelligence maths teaching platform. Blutick in association with the Perse School, exhibited at the BETT Show in London, 2019 to launch a free beta version.

== Developments ==
Since 2020, the Perse School Cambridge International (TPSCI) has liaised with partners to open up The Perse international schools outside of England. Currently, one international school has been set up in Singapore, namely the Perse School Singapore (officially opened in January 2025).

== Headmaster's blog ==
On his blog the headmaster, Ed Elliott, described his 'ten second challenge' in which he would give students who "commit occasional minor misdemeanours (such as forgetting a book) the opportunity to talk their way out of a punishment". The story was quickly picked up by the mainstream media who reported that pupils were "let off punishment for clever excuses".

== Notable alumni ==
=== Academia ===
- Maurice Bloch, anthropologist
- Harold James, professor of history and international relations
- W. E. Johnson, logician
- F. R. Leavis, literary critic
- Michael Loewe, sinologist
- Edward Henry Palmer, orientalist
- G. L. S. Shackle, economist
- E. H. Warmington, classicist

=== Art ===
- Thomas P. Campbell, director of the Metropolitan Museum of Art

=== Business ===
- David Tang, Hong Kong-based entrepreneur

=== Engineering ===
- Arthur Marshall, aviation engineer
- Anthony Michell, hydraulic engineer

=== Film and theatre ===
- Ranjit Bolt, translator and playwright
- Marius Goring, actor
- Peter Hall, founder of the Royal Shakespeare Company
- Humphrey Jennings, film director
- Colin McFarlane, actor
- Jeremy Silberston, film director

=== Law ===
- Mark Potter, Appeal Court judge and President of the Family Division

=== Media ===
- Simon Akam, author, writing on military history and the British Army since 9/11
- Mel Calman, cartoonist
- Rodney Dale, writer and publisher
- John Gross, critic and editor
- Tom Harwood, journalist for Guido Fawkes, The Daily Telegraph and GB News
- Tom Rosenthal (1935–2014), publisher and art critic
- Mark Saggers, BBC sports broadcaster

=== Military ===
- William Neil McKechnie, George Cross recipient
- Ralph Lilley Turner, 2nd/3rd Queen Alexandra's Own Gurkha Rifles

=== Music ===
- Pete Atkin, singer/songwriter
- David Gilmour, singer/songwriter and guitarist of Pink Floyd
- Spike Hughes, jazz musician and journalist
- Jack Monck, bassist, session player
- Ronnie Ross, jazz musician
- John Woolford, first boyfriend of Benjamin Britten

=== Politics ===
- Anthony Browne, Conservative MP for South Cambridgeshire
- Rajani Palme Dutt, leading figure in the Communist Party of Great Britain
- Julian Huppert, Liberal Democrat MP for Cambridge 2010-2015
- David Steiner, New York State Commissioner of Education
- Donald Tebbit, diplomat, British High Commissioner to Australia
- Quentin Thomas, civil servant, head of the British Board of Film Classification
- Josh Simons, ex-Labour MP under Starmer

=== Religion ===
- Henry Mazey
- John Polkinghorne, physicist and theologian
- Jeremy Taylor, Bishop of Down and Connor

=== Science ===
- Gustav Victor Rudolf Born, pharmacologist
- John Clarke, Nobel laureate in Physics, 2025
- Anthony Peter Lowe, mathematical physicist and actuary
- Brian G. Marsden, astronomer
- Ronald G. W. Norrish, Nobel Prize in Chemistry in 1967
- George Paget Thomson, Nobel Prize in Physics in 1937

=== Sport ===
- Zaman Akhter, cricketer
- Charles Clayton, cricketer
- Owen Giles, Northampton Saints rugby union player
- Alex Coles, Northamption Saints rugby union player
- Horace Gray, cricketer
- Richard Hesketh, cricketer
- Tess Howard, field hockey player
- Michael Pepper, cricketer
- Reimell Ragnauth, cricketer

== Staff ==
=== Headmasters ===
- George Griffith - died 1686
- Frederick Heppenstall - 1864 to 1874
- W. H. D. Rouse - 1902 to 1928. Formerly a fellow of Christ's College, Cambridge
- H. A. Wootton - 1928 to 1945
- Stanley Stubbs - 1945 to 1969. Formerly a housemaster at Gresham's School
- Anthony E. Melville - 1969 to 1987. He was the last of the Perse Headmasters to cane students.
- Martin Stephen - 1987 to 1994. Subsequently, High Master of Manchester Grammar School from 1994 to 2004 and then St Paul's School from 2004 to 2011. Director of Education for GEMS Education UK. Non-Executive Chairman of the Clarendon Academies Group
- Nigel P. V. Richardson - 1994 to 2008. Headmaster of The Dragon School from 1989 to 1992. Chairman of the Headmasters' and Headmistresses' Conference in 2007. Governor of Magdalen College School and Haileybury. AGBIS board member. Author of the biography Thring of Uppingham: Victorian Educator
- Mr Edward C. Elliott - 2008 onwards. Joined the school in 1997 as head of sixth form and was senior deputy head before being appointed headmaster

=== Notable staff ===
- Henry Caldwell Cook, (1886–1939) educationalist
- Frederick Crossfield Happold
- Lilly Frazer (1854/5 – 1941) French teacher and writer
- Glenn Kirkham, captain of the England national field hockey team and Perse's Director of Sport from September 2017 to June 2023.
- Helen Richardson-Walsh, hockey gold medalist
