= Free School Lane =

Street in Cambridge, England

Coordinates: 52.20337°N 0.11870°E

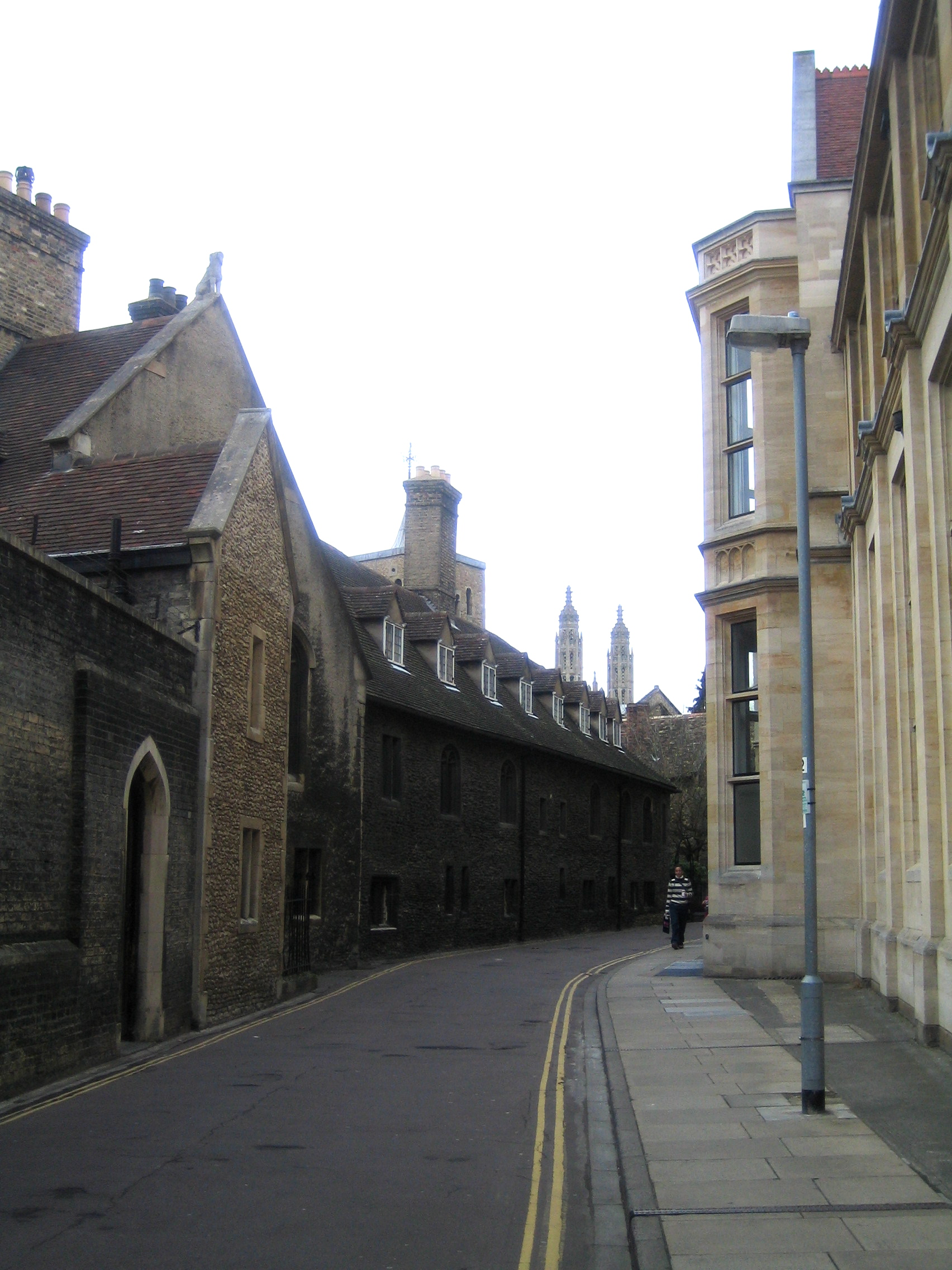
- Namesake: Free School
- North end: Bene't Street
- South end: Pembroke Street

Free School Lane is a historic street in central Cambridge, England which includes important buildings of University of Cambridge. It is the location of the Whipple Museum of the History of Science, the Department of History and Philosophy of Science (HPS,) the University's faculty of Social and Political Sciences, and is the original site of the Engineering Department, and the Physics Department's Cavendish Laboratory. At the northern end is Bene't Street and at the southern end is Pembroke Street. To the east is the New Museums Site of the University. To the west is Corpus Christi College.

== The Free School ==
The name of the street comes from the "Free School" which was established in the 17th century by Dr Stephen Perse who left money in his will to educate 100 boys from Cambridge, Barnwell, Chesterton and Trumpington. This school later became the first site of The Perse School (now in Hills Road). The Whipple Museum is situated in the original school hall.

== Friar House ==
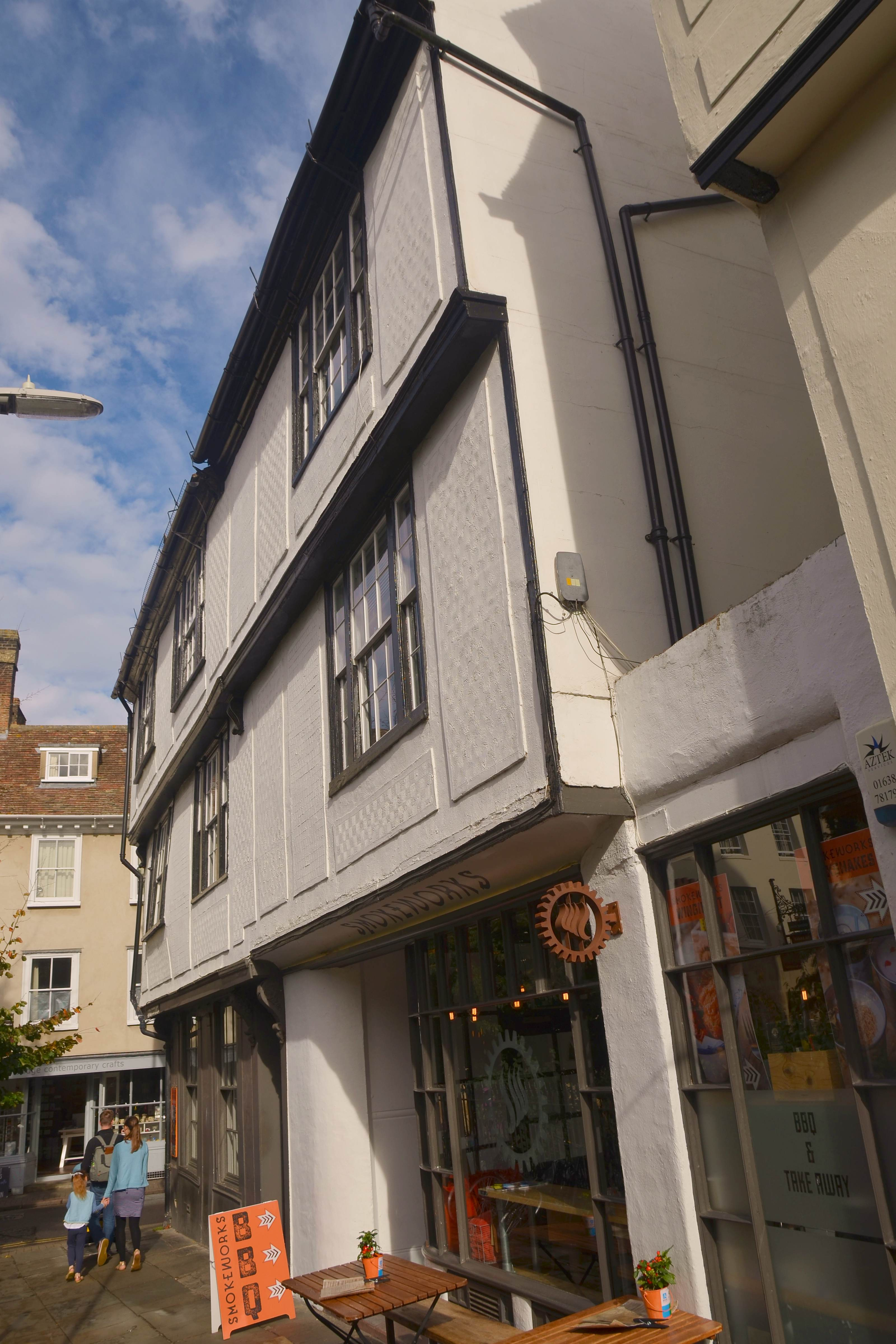
Friar House at the northern end of Free School Lane

While at Cambridge University, Clive James and Germaine Greer lived at Friar House, an early-17th-century Grade II listed building with a timber frame and pargeting at the corner of Bene't Street and Free School Lane.
