= Downing Street, Cambridge =

Street in Cambridge, England

Coordinates: 52.203°N 0.122°E

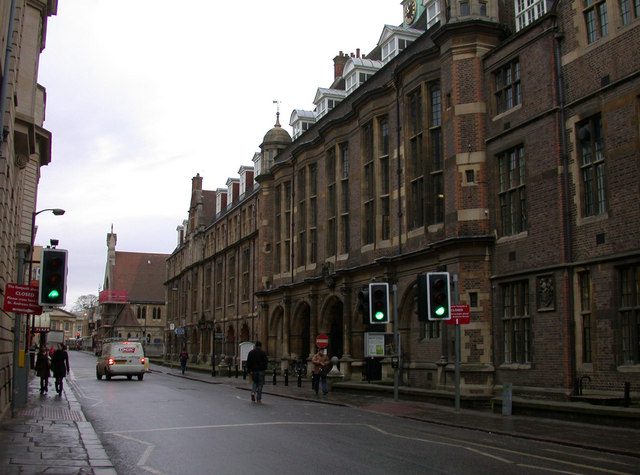
The Sedgwick Museum of Earth Sciences, on Downing Street.

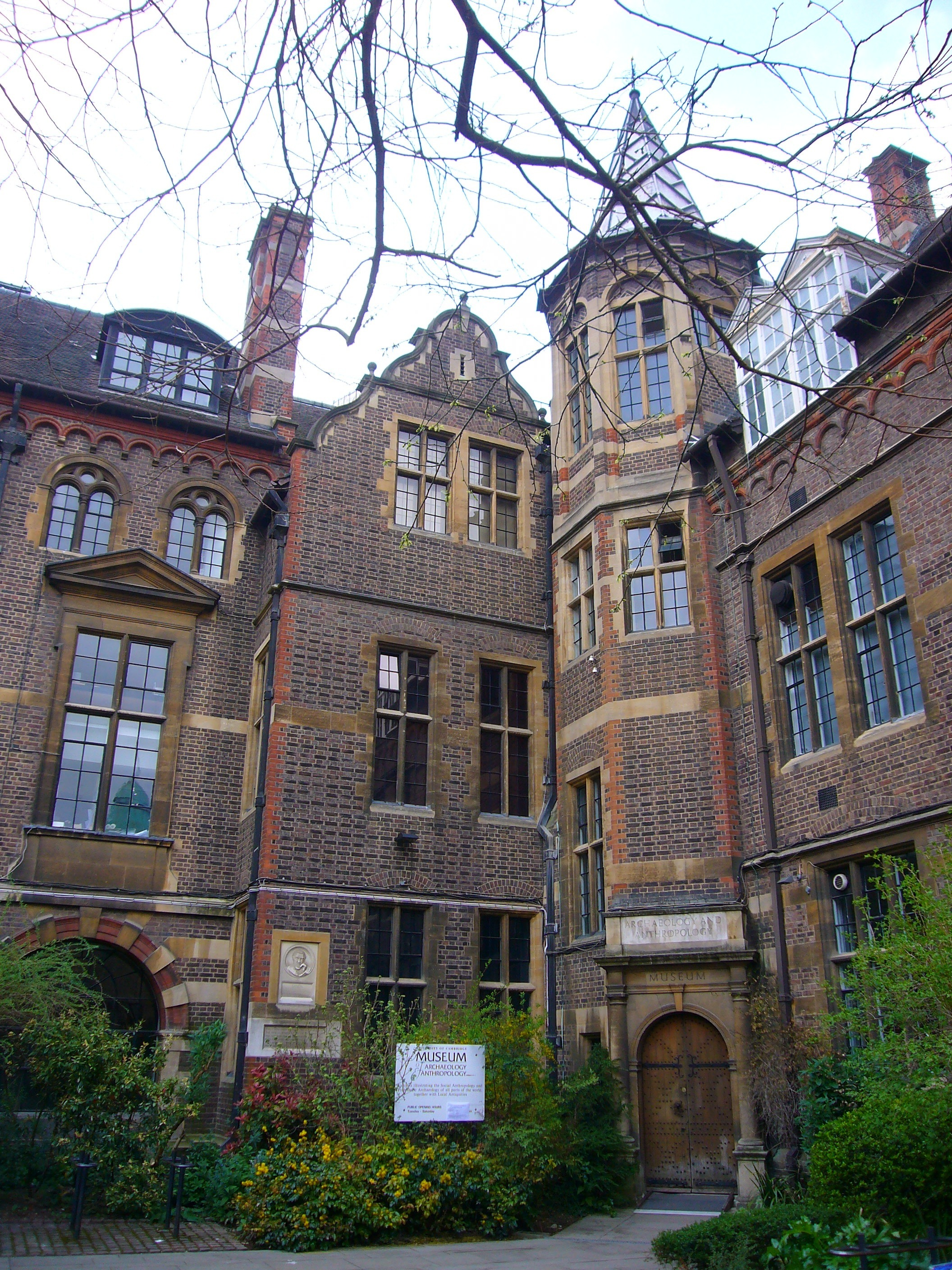
The Museum of Archaeology and Anthropology, on the corner of Downing Street and Tennis Court Road.

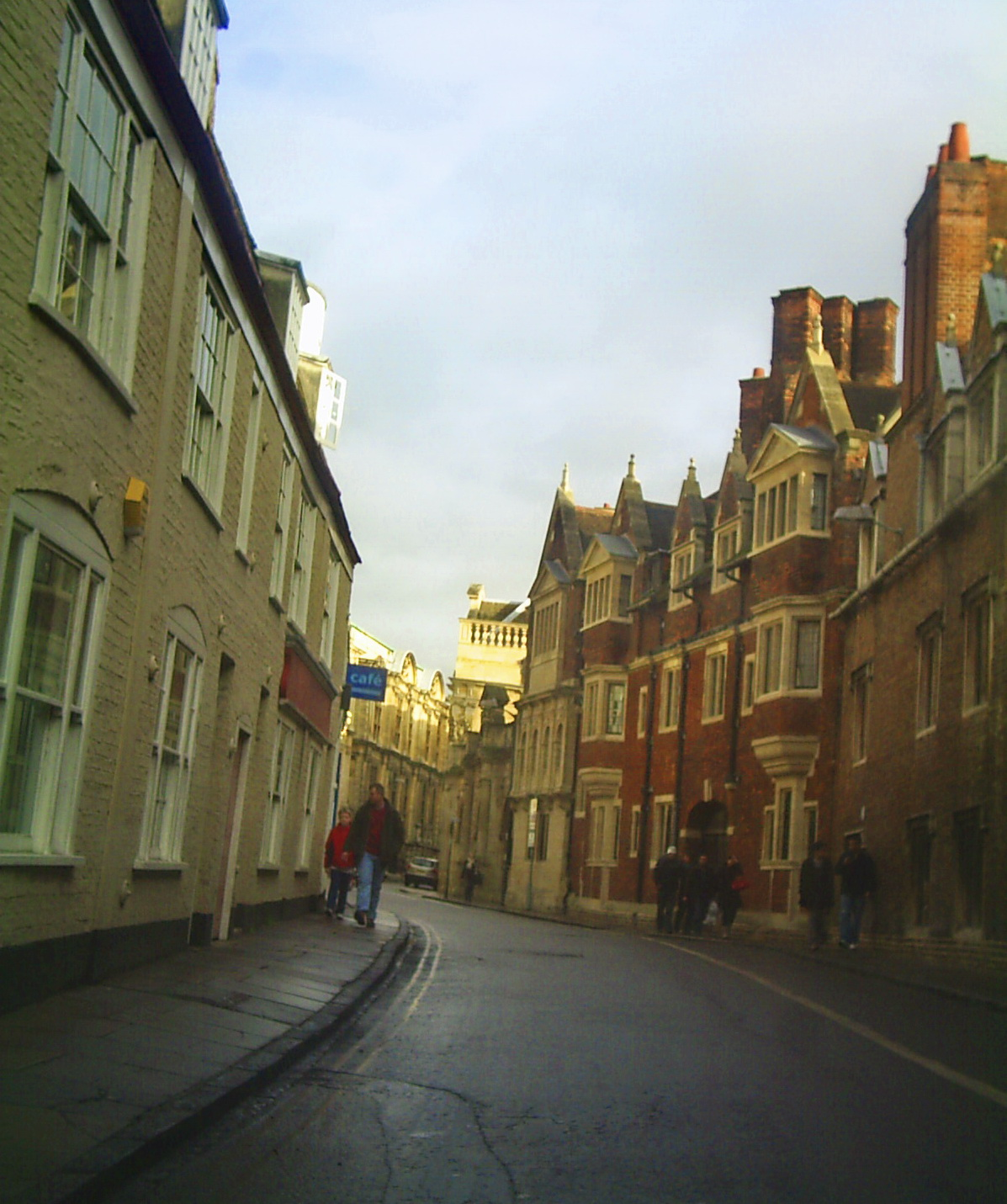
Toward Pembroke Street through Downing Street.

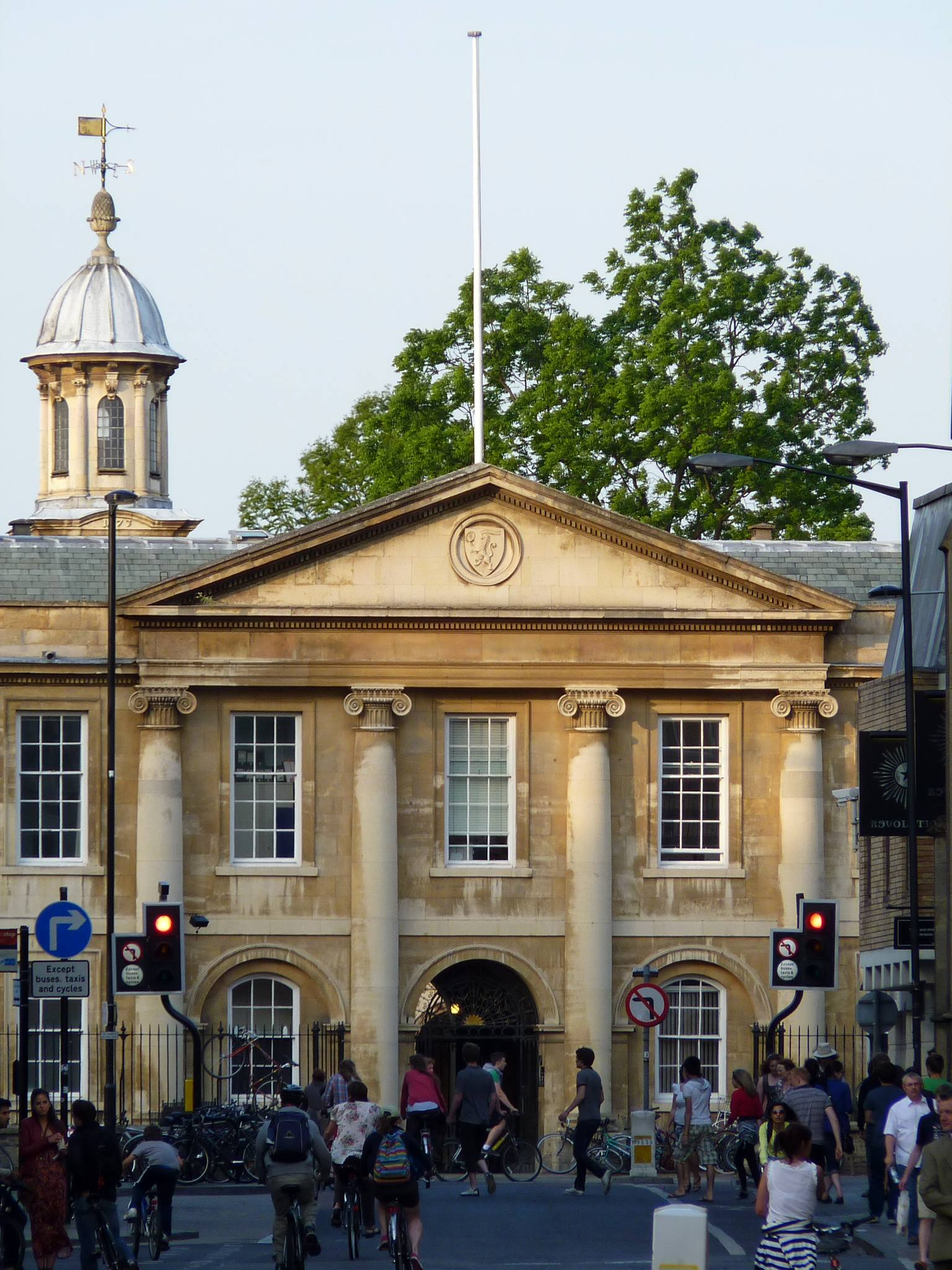
Front facade of Emmanuel College, Cambridge viewed from Downing Street.

Downing Street is a street in central Cambridge, England. It runs between Pembroke Street and Tennis Court Road at the western end and a T-junction with St Andrew's Street at the eastern end. Corn Exchange Street and St Tibbs Row lead off to the north. Downing Place leads off to the south.

To the north at the western end is the New Museums Site of the University of Cambridge. To the south is the Downing Site of the University. Many of the University's departments are located here. Downing Place United Reformed Church (St Columba's) is on the corner with Downing Place.

== History ==
The area south of Downing Street was originally known as Pembroke Leys, a boggy area to the south of Cambridge in medieval times. This was acquired for Downing College. The architect William Wilkins was tasked by the trustees of the Downing estate to design the plan for the college. Wilkins, a devotee of the neoclassical architectural style, designed the first campus-based college layout in the world with a magnificent entrance planned on Downing Street, reaching back to form the largest court in Cambridge, extending to Lensfield Road far to the south. However, the estate was much reduced from that expected and these grand plans failed to materialize. Much of the northern end of the Pembroke Leys was sold to the University and is now home to scientific departments and museums on the Downing Site.

== Museums ==
There are several of the University's museums in this location. On the corner with Tennis Court Road is the Museum of Archaeology and Anthropology. On the corner with Downing Place is the Sedgwick Museum of Earth Sciences. To the north at the eastern end of the New Museums Site is the Cambridge University Museum of Zoology. Just to the west is the Whipple Museum of the History of Science in Free School Lane off Pembroke Street.

== See also ==
- List of museums in Cambridge
