= Tennis Court Road =

Historic street in Cambridge, England

Coordinates: 52°12′03″N 0°07′18″E

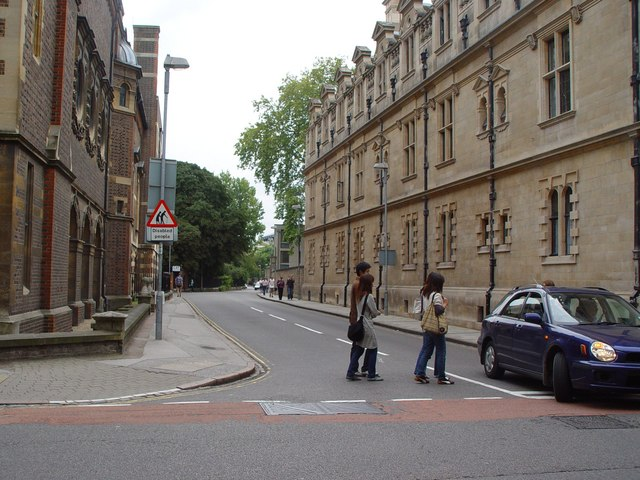
- View along Tennis Court Road
- Interactive map of Tennis Court Road
- Location: Cambridge, England
- North end: Pembroke Street / Downing Street
- Major junctions: Fitzwilliam Street
- South end: Lensfield Road

Tennis Court Road is a historic street in central Cambridge, England. It runs parallel with Trumpington Street to the west and Regent Street to the east. At the northern end is a junction with Pembroke Street to the west and Downing Street to the east. To the south as a T-junction with Lensfield Road (the A603). Fitzwilliam Street leads off the road to the west towards the Fitzwilliam Museum.

Pembroke College is to the west at the northern end and Downing College is to the east at the southern end of the road.

To the east at the northern end is the Downing Site, a major site for departments of the University of Cambridge. On the northeastern end of the road on this site is one of the University museums, the Museum of Archaeology and Anthropology.

Also on the road are:

- The Hopkins Building (University of Cambridge Department of Biochemistry, built 1924)
- The University of Cambridge Department of Pathology (built 1927)
- The Cambridge Judge Business School (built 1991–95)
- The Gurdon Institute (built 2004)
- The Wellcome Trust Centre for Stem Cell Research

Leading off the road to the east is the cul-de-sac Tennis Court Terrace. Peterhouse owns terraced houses in this street.

== Gallery ==
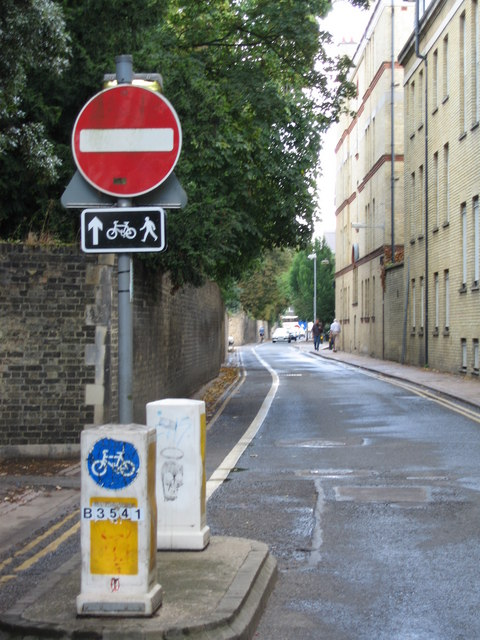
Another view along Tennis Court Road.

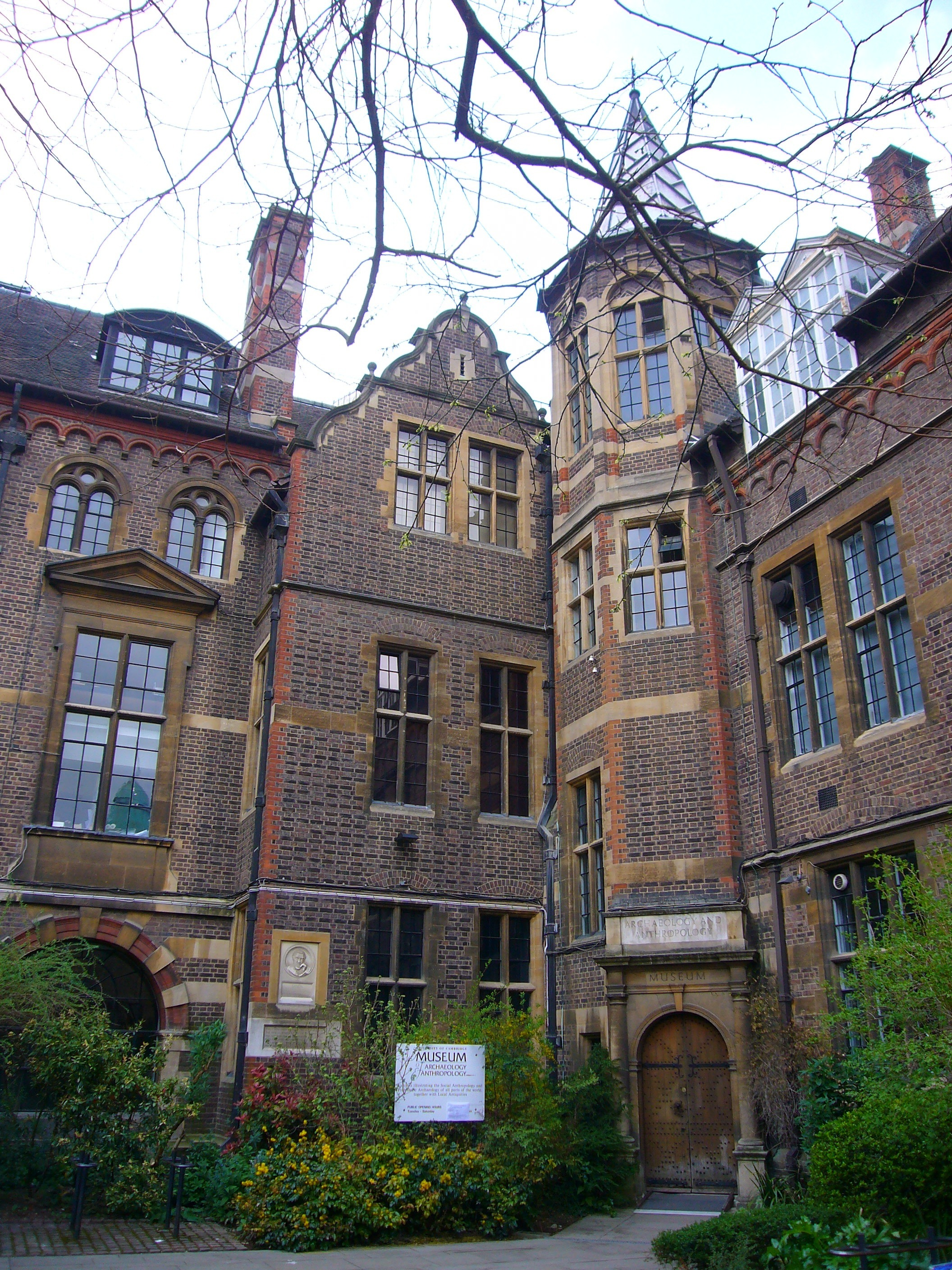
The Museum of Archaeology and Anthropology, on the corner of Tennis Court Road and Downing Street.
