= Old Addenbrooke's Site =

Site owned by the University of Cambridge

Coordinates: 52.1994°N 0.1220°E

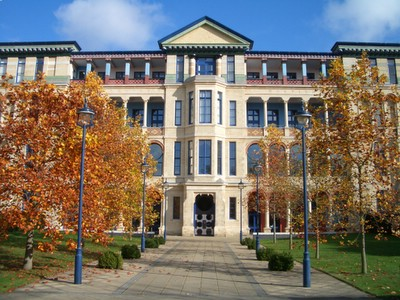
Cambridge Judge Business School on the Old Addenbrooke's Site

The Old Addenbrooke's Site is a site owned by the University of Cambridge in the south of central Cambridge, England. It is located on the block formed by Fitzwilliam Street to the north, Tennis Court Road to the east, Lensfield Road to the south, and Trumpington Street to the west.

Addenbrooke's Hospital was founded in 1766 on Trumpington Street, but in 1976, it relocated to larger premises further out of the city to the southeast at the end of Hills Road, hence the name of this site now. The Cambridge Judge Business School is located on the northern part of the site in Trumpington Street. The Sanger Building, housing part of the University of Cambridge Department of Biochemistry, is on the southern part of the site on Tennis Court Road. There are a number of other university buildings on the site, especially administrative university offices. To the east is Downing College and to the west at the northern end is the Fitzwilliam Museum.

To the northeast is the Downing Site, another University of Cambridge site with departments and museums.
