= New Museums Site =

Site of the University of Cambridge

Coordinates: 52.2035°N 0.1196°E

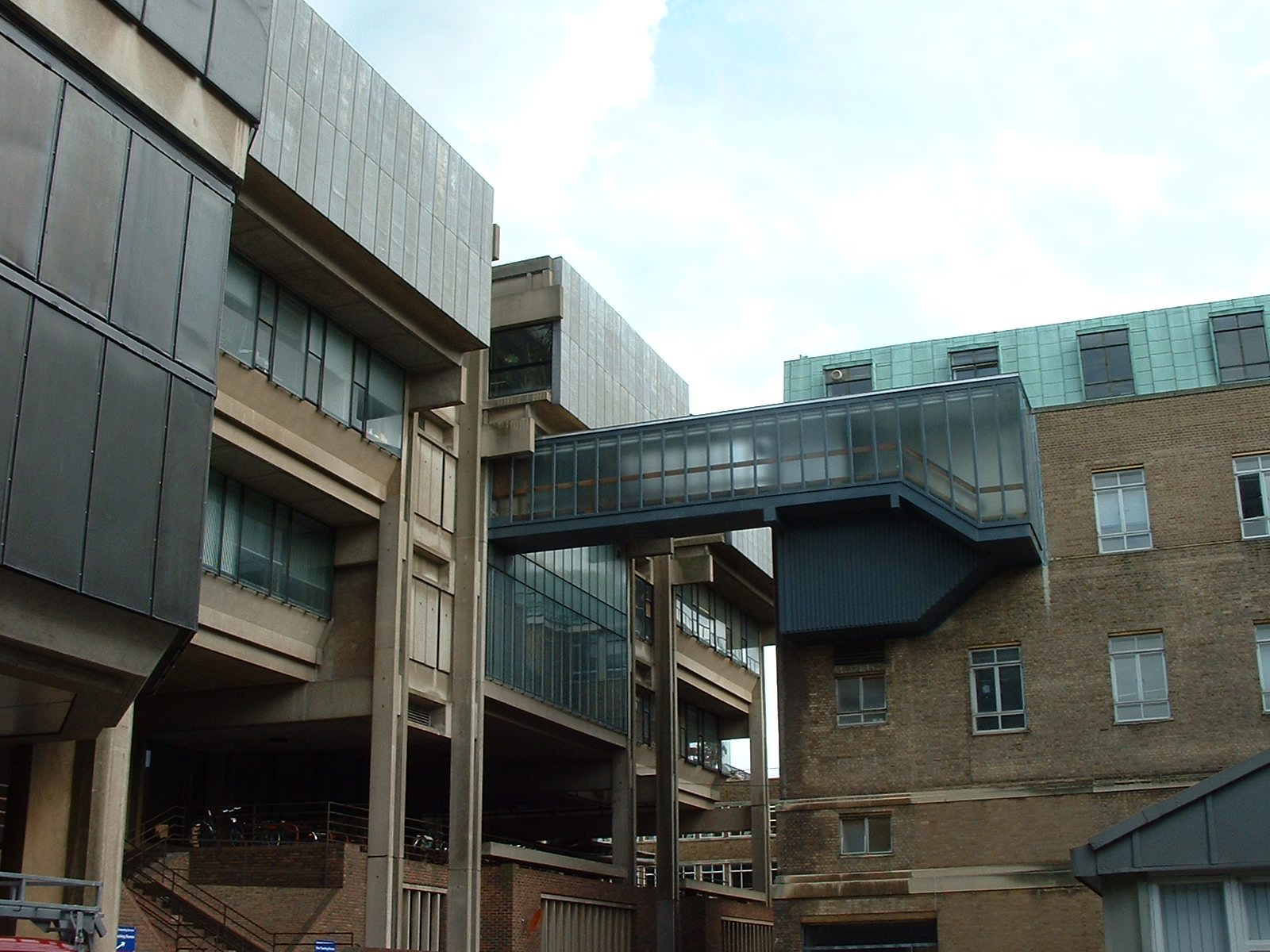
New Museums Site

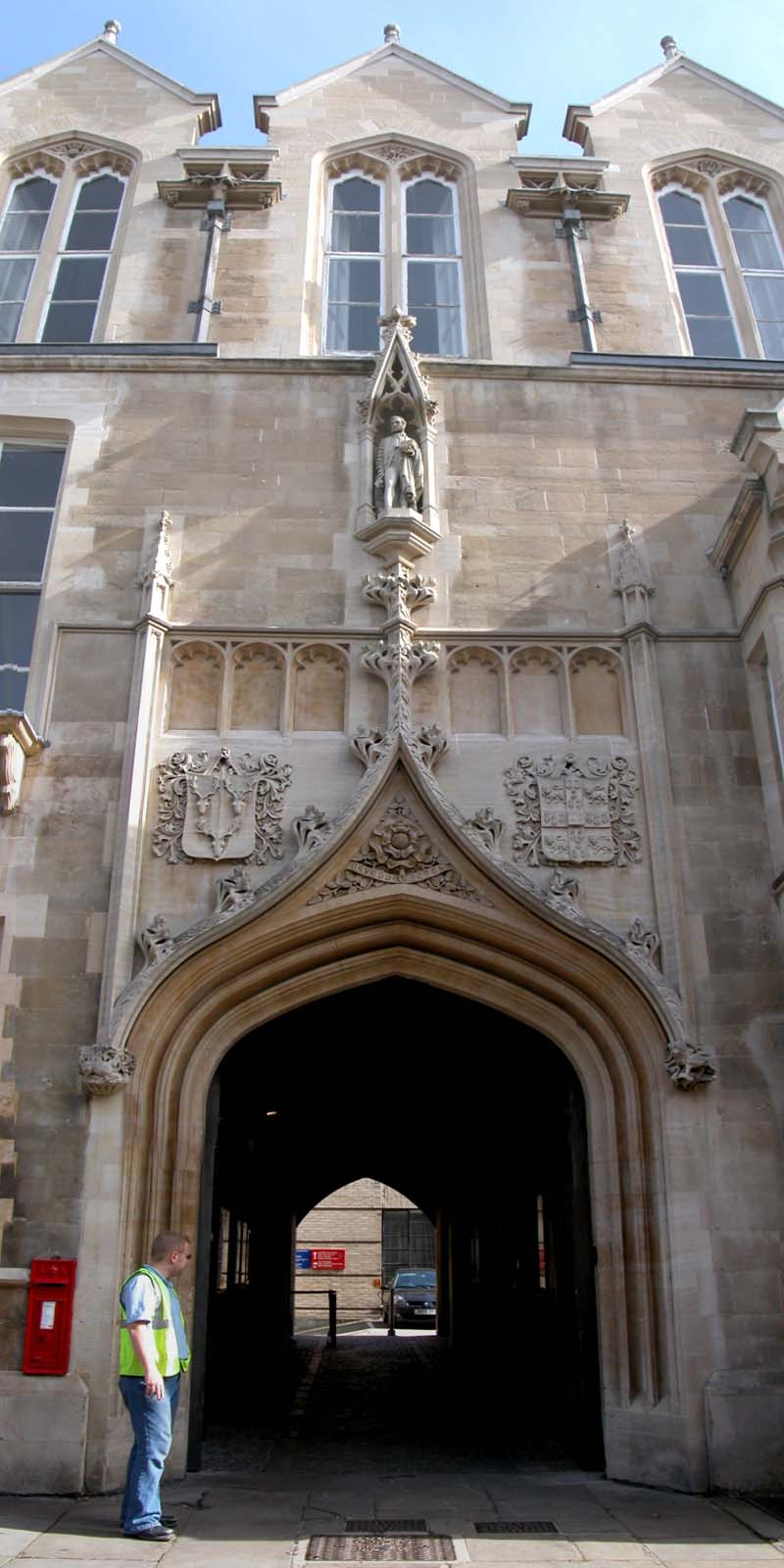
Free School Lane entrance (Old Cavendish Laboratory)

The New Museums Site is a major site of the University of Cambridge, located on Pembroke Street and Free School Lane, sandwiched between Corpus Christi College, Pembroke College and Lion Yard. Its postcode is CB2 3QH. The smaller and older of two university city-centre science sites (the other is the Downing Site), the New Museums Site houses many of the university's science departments and lecture theatres, as well as two museums.

== History ==
New Museums was the second university departmental site, after the Old Schools (near the Senate House), and the university's first science site. Several important scientific developments of the 19th and 20th centuries were made at the New Museums Site, mainly at the Old Cavendish Laboratory, including the discoveries of the electron by J. J. Thomson (1897) and the neutron by Chadwick (1932), splitting the atom by Cockcroft and Walton (1932), mechanism of nervous conduction by Hodgkin and Huxley (1930s–40s), and DNA structure by Watson and Crick (1953).

The area now forming the site was at the centre of medieval Cambridge. The King's Ditch, possibly a Saxon structure, cut through the south-east corner until the early 19th century. An Augustinian Friary was founded on the site in 1290; some of its buildings remained in the late 16th century and they form part of the fabric of the Old Cavendish Laboratory. The Free School, later the Perse School, was built in the 1620s in the south-west; Mortlock's house followed in the 18th century in the north of the site. In 1762, a Botanic Garden was developed over much of the site. In 1832, anatomy buildings were erected, designed by Charles Humfrey.

The foundation of the Natural Sciences Tripos in 1848–51, as well as the expansion of laboratories at new universities and colleges, provided the stimulus for the provision of university science facilities. When the University Botanic Garden moved to its current location between Hills Road and Trumpington Road in the south of the city in 1846–52, the university acquired the site for "new museums and Lecture Rooms". A proposal for the new site was developed by Robert Willis and others, with Anthony Salvin as the suggested architect, but delays ensued over multiple issues, particularly the budget of £23,000. Construction did not start until 1863; the first building, to cut-down plans by Salvin, opened in 1866, and housed museums of botany, mineralogy and morphology.

The original Cavendish Laboratory (experimental physics) followed in 1870–3, funded privately by William Cavendish, the university chancellor, and designed by W. M. Fawcett. A building serving zoology, comparative anatomy and physiology, designed by William Fawcett, opened in 1878, and the biology facilities were extended in 1882 and 1884. Chemical laboratories and lecture rooms were built in 1886–88. The Perse School building had been converted into an engineering laboratory by 1890 and a temporary mechanics (engineering) building was erected. A physiology building was in use in 1891. Overcrowding of the site was already a major problem by the mid-1890s, and nearby land was purchased for a second science site, which became the Downing Site.

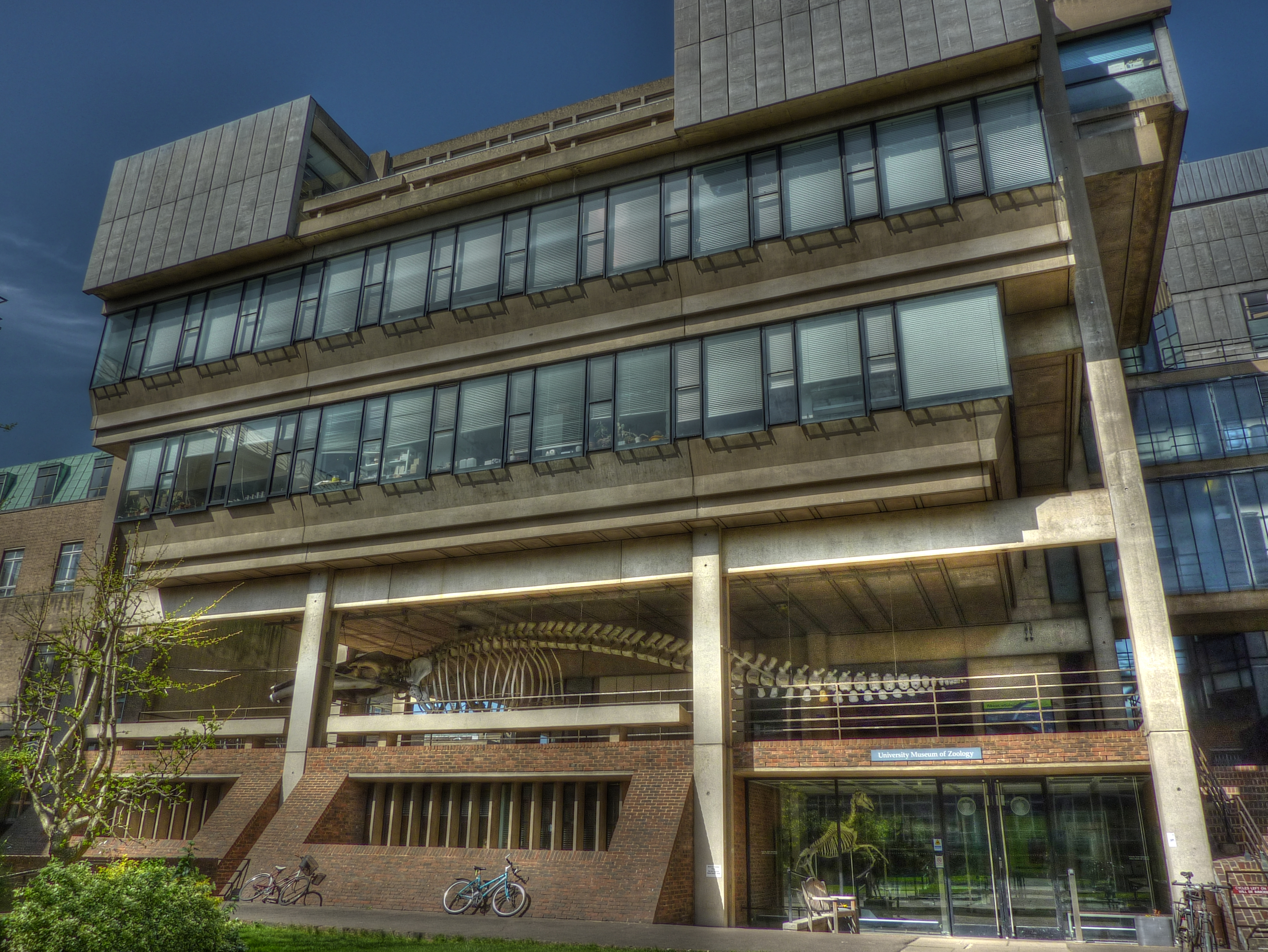
Arup Building, housing the Zoology Museum, in 2011

The early 20th century saw the completion of the Zoology Building, Examination Halls (1909) and Arts School (1911) on the New Museums Site. The Mond Laboratory, funded by the Royal Society and designed by H. C. Hughes, was built in 1932–33 as a physics laboratory, and was extended later that decade with the Austin Wing. Several other buildings were erected in the early-to-mid 20th century. In 1945, a university report recommended that the departments of chemistry and metallurgy should relocate to Lensfield Road, and in 1952 the decision was made to move the chemistry department.

By the mid-1950s it was obvious that the substantial problems with the New Museums Site's accommodation were going to require a "radical" re-evaluation of the site's use. Various schemes were considered, including ones by Murray Easton (1956) and Denys Lasdun (1960); the latter included several towers up to 190 feet and would have greatly affected the view from The Backs, but was scaled down after a public enquiry in 1964 limited the height of the towers. Lasdun resigned and was replaced by Arup Associates, who further altered Lasdun's plan, reducing the towers to 80 feet. The centre of the site was redeveloped to Arup's plan in 1966–71, with the loss of most of the original buildings by Salvin to accommodate the Arup Building (now the David Attenborough Building), accommodating zoology and metallurgy. In 1974, the Cavendish Laboratory moved to a new science site to the west of the city, now known as West Cambridge.

Further major redevelopment started in 2011.

== Architecture ==
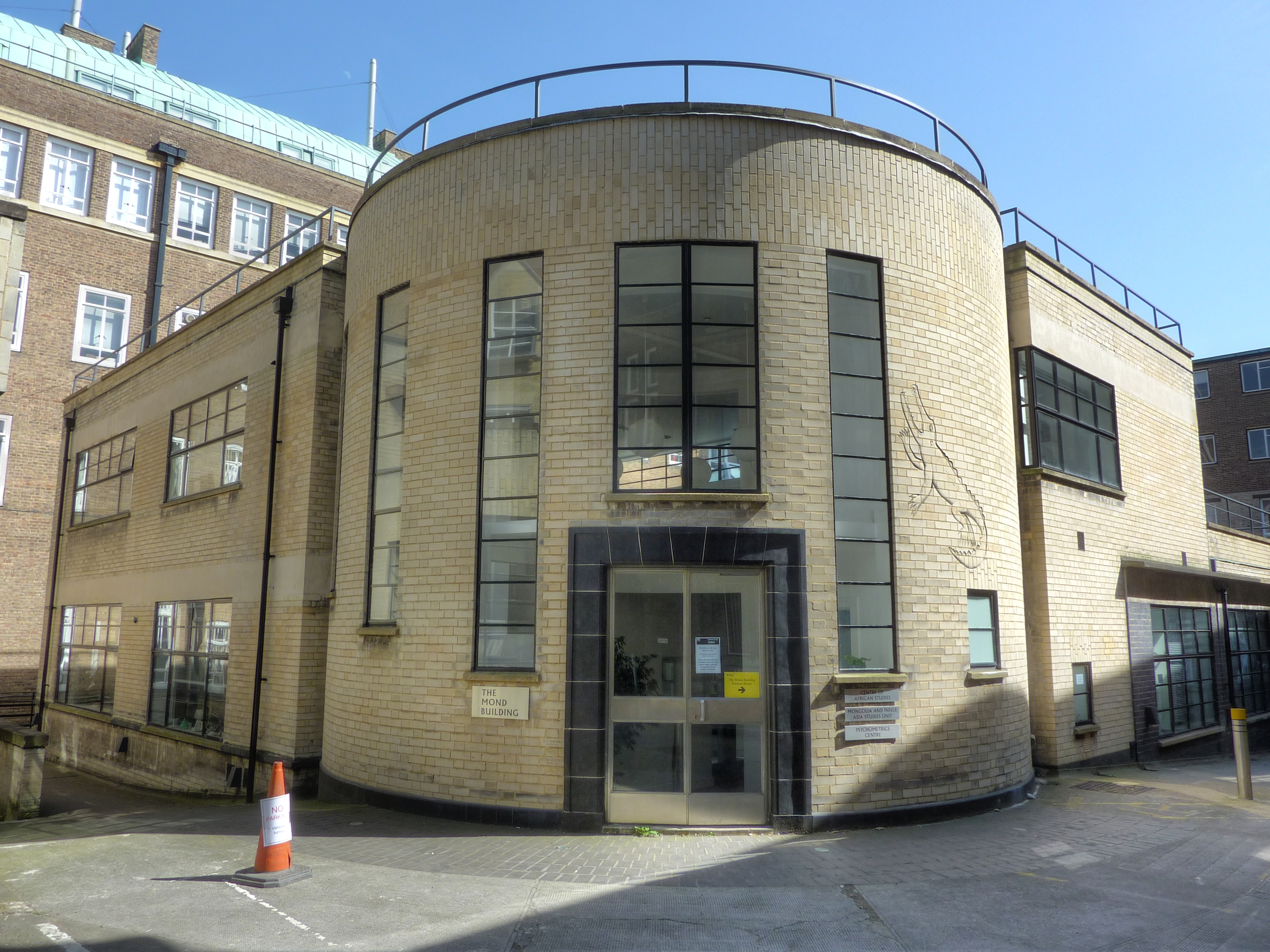
Mond Building

The New Museums Site is an eclectic mixture of grand Victorian and Edwardian buildings erected between 1863 and 1911, such as the Old Cavendish Laboratory; brown-brick buildings from the 1930–40s, largely utilitarian with the exception of the Mond Building; and modernist glass-and-concrete buildings dating from the 1960s and 1970s, such as the Arup Building and the Materials Science and Metallurgy tower. Five of the buildings are listed at grade II: the Mond Building (currently the home of the Mongolia and Inner Asia Studies Unit at the University of Cambridge and from July 2026 also of the Bennett School of Public Policy), Zoology Building, Old Physical Chemistry, Cavendish Laboratory and the Arts School.

== Institutions and buildings ==
Current

- Babbage Lecture Theatre
- Bennett School of Public Policy, Mond Building
- Cockcroft Lecture Theatre
- Department of History and Philosophy of Science
- Division of Social Anthropology
- Department of Psychology (formerly Division of Social and Developmental Psychology)
- Department of Sociology
- Department of Zoology
- Mongolia and Inner Asia Studies Unit, Mond Building
- Social and Political Sciences Library
- Student Services Centre – opened in 2019; includes Cambridge Admissions Office, Cambridge Trust Careers Service, Disability Resource Centre, International Student Office and Student Registry
- Whipple Museum of the History of Science
- Zoology Museum

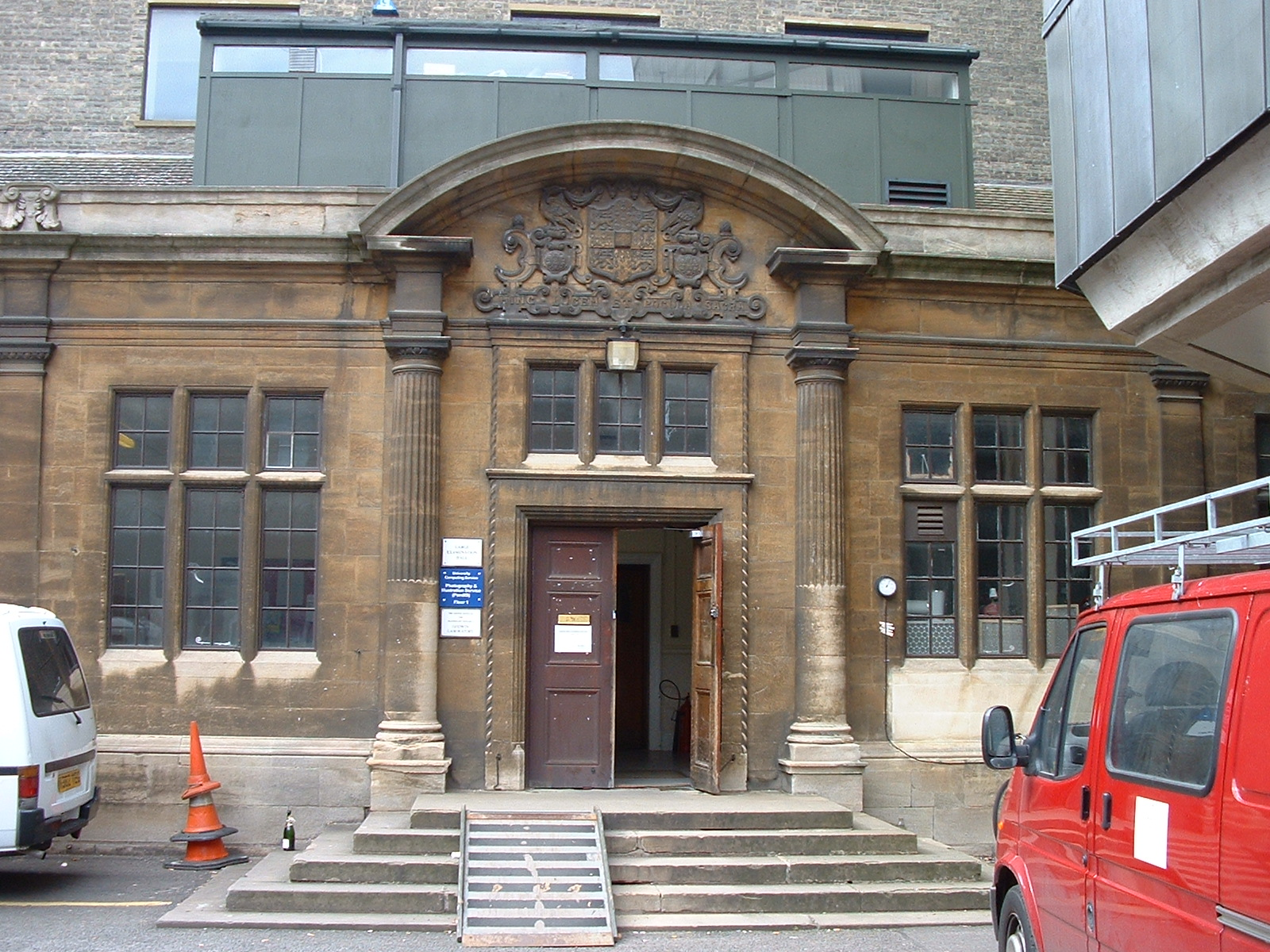
Entrance to the Old Examinations Hall, demolished in 2016

Former

- Old Cavendish Laboratory – former physics laboratory; in use from 1873
- Engineering Department – founded here in 1875, relocated to Scroope House site in 1921
- Phoenix – former university mainframe; decommissioned in 1995
- Computer Laboratory – relocated to West Cambridge in 2001
- University Computing Service – relocated to West Cambridge in 2013
- Department of Materials Science and Metallurgy – relocated to West Cambridge in 2013
- Philosophical Library/Scientific Periodicals Library (from 1967)/Central Science Library (from 1995) – moved to site in 1865; closed in 2015
- Department of Chemical Engineering – moved to Shell Building on the site in 1959; relocated to West Cambridge in 2016–17
- Old Examinations Hall – demolished in 2016 to make way for the Student Services Centre, which incorporates its portico
