= Downing Site =

Site of the University of Cambridge

Coordinates: 52.2021°N 0.1224°E

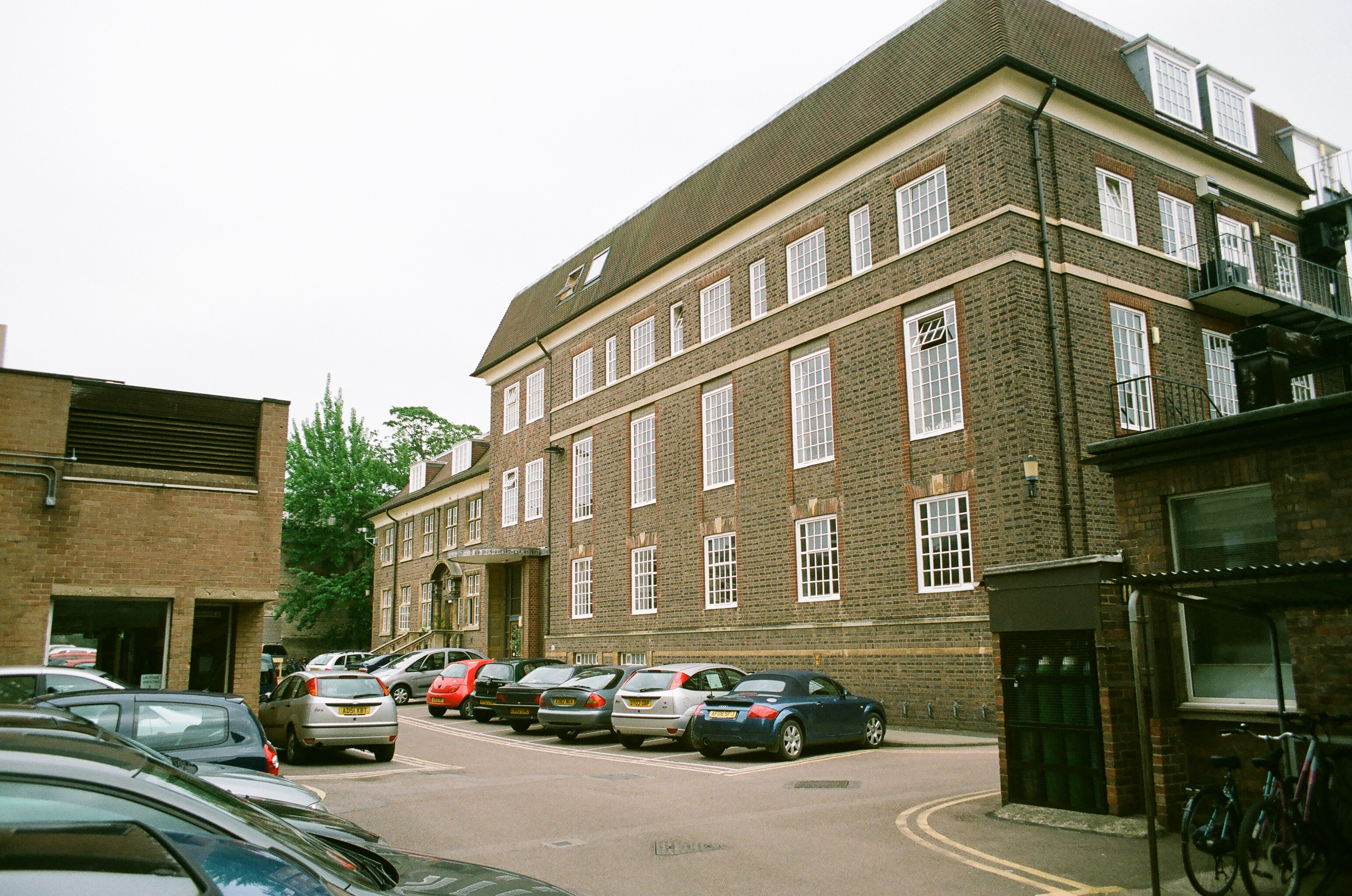
The University of Cambridge Department of Geography on the Downing Site, at the southeast end of Downing Place, off Downing Street.

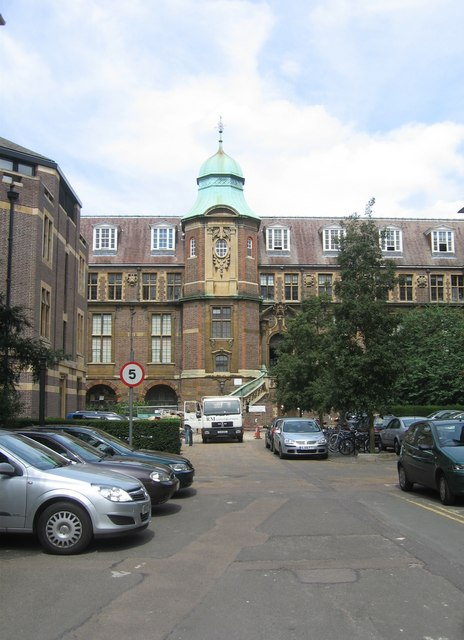
The University of Cambridge Department of Earth Sciences on the Downing Site.

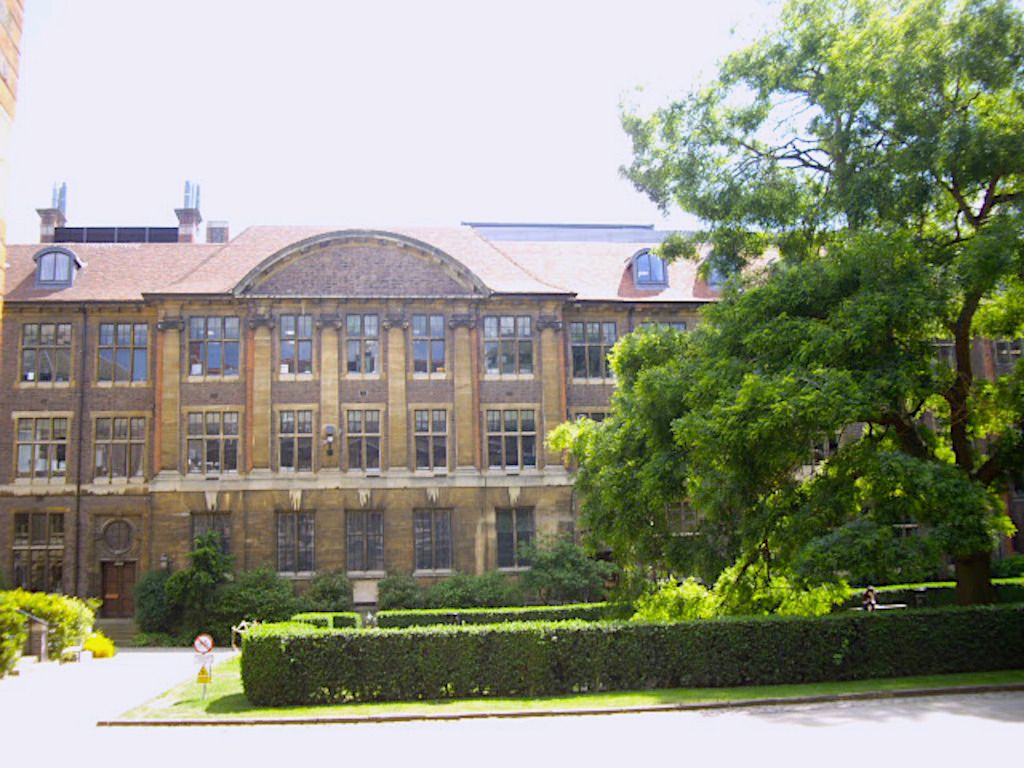
Department of Plant Sciences

The Downing Site is a major site of the University of Cambridge, located in the centre of the city of Cambridge, England, on Downing Street and Tennis Court Road, adjacent to Downing College. The Downing Site is the larger and older of two city-centre science sites of the university (the other being the New Museums Site). Largely populated with utilitarian brick buildings dating from the 1930s, the more notable buildings include the Zoology Laboratory (1900–04), Sedgwick Museum of Earth Sciences (1904–11) and Downing Street entrance (1904–11).

To the northwest is the New Museums Site and to the southwest is the Old Addenbrooke's Site, two other important University of Cambridge sites.

== History ==
The current site was part of Pembroke Leys, a boggy area of small fields lying between Regent Street and Tennis Court Road, to the south of the medieval town of Cambridge. The Pembroke Leys was acquired by Downing College on its foundation, but the northern portion of the Leys remained undeveloped. This northern portion was purchased by the university in 1895 for £15,000, and now forms the Downing Site.

== University departments and institutions ==
Though several university departments have recently relocated to larger modern buildings elsewhere, the Downing Site still houses many departments, predominantly in the biomedical sciences. These include:

- Department of Biochemistry (old site)
- Department of Earth Sciences
- Department of Psychology
- Department of Genetics
- Department of Geography
- Department of Pathology
- Department of Physiology, Development and Neuroscience
- Department of Plant Sciences (formerly Botany)
- Department of Veterinary Anatomy
- Department of Archaeology and Anthropology
- McDonald Institute for Archaeological Research
- Molteno Laboratory (Parasitology)
- Museum of Archaeology and Anthropology
- Physiological Laboratory
- Sedgwick Museum of Earth Sciences
- Zoology Laboratory
