= Park Terrace =

Park Terrace may refer to

- Park Terrace, Adelaide
- Park Terrace, Cambridge
