= Pembroke Street, Cambridge =

Street in Cambridge, England

Coordinates: 52.2023°N 0.1192°E

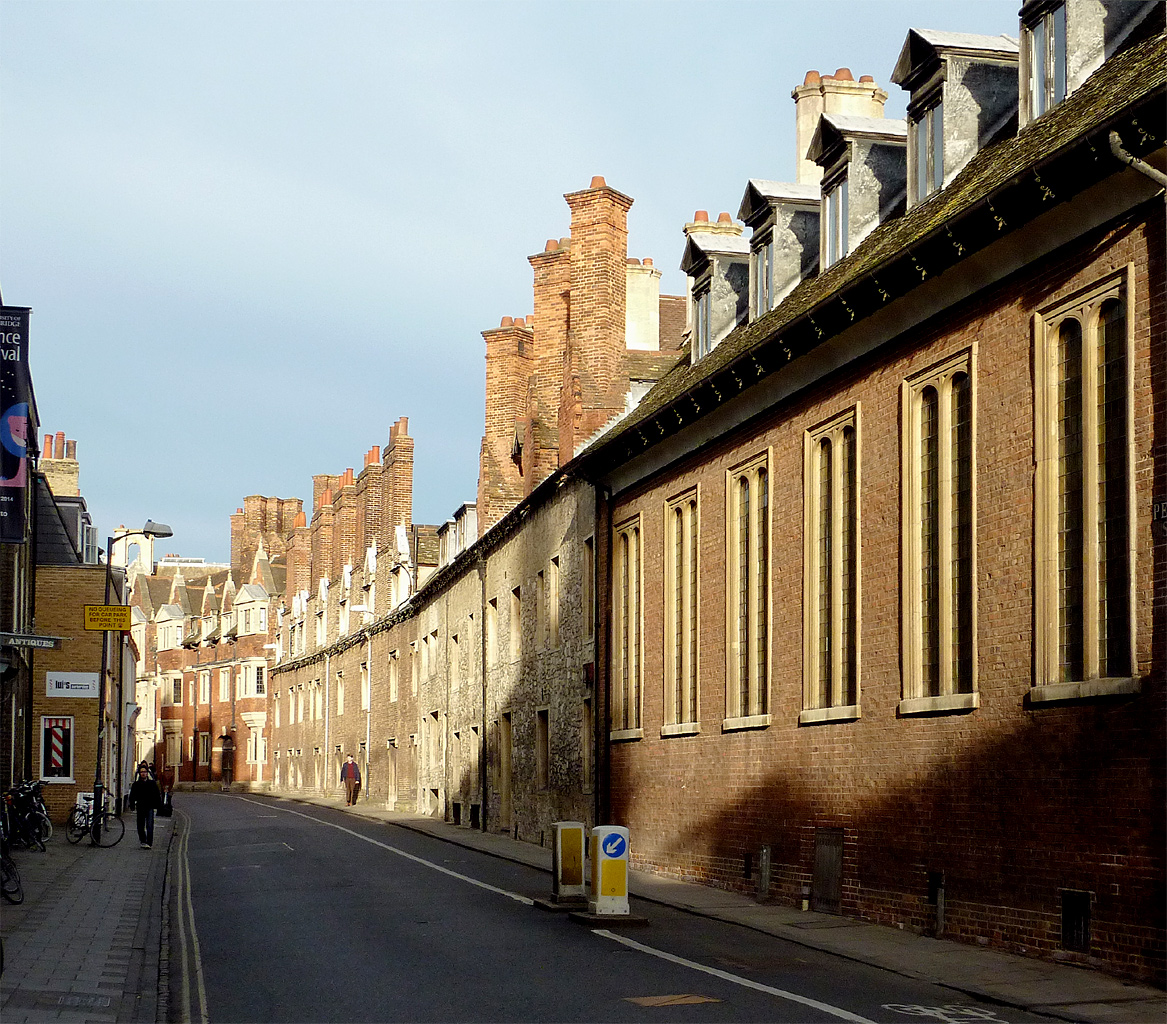
View along Pembroke Street

Pembroke Street is a street in central Cambridge, England. It runs between Downing Street and Tennis Court Road at the eastern end and a junction with Trumpington Street at the western end. It continues west on the other side of Trumpington Street as Mill Lane.

To the south of the street, along its entire length, is Pembroke College, hence the name. In the 20th century, the architect W. D. Caröe added the Pitt Building between Ivy Court and the Alfred Waterhouse former Master's Lodge, and extended New Court with the construction of a new staircase on the other side of the Lodge. He linked the two buildings with an arched stone screen, Caröe Bridge, along Pembroke Street in a late Baroque style. To the north, at the eastern end, is the New Museums Site of the University of Cambridge. The Cambridge University Department of Chemical Engineering was located here until 2017. Just to the north of Pembroke Street is the Whipple Museum of the History of Science in Free School Lane, which leads off Pembroke Street. Botolph Lane runs parallel with Pembroke Street just to the north of it, between Free School Lane and Trumpington Street, to the south of Corpus Christi College. Just to the north is the Whipple Museum of the History of Science.

The King's Ditch used to be located here. There are several historic listed buildings in Pembroke Street.
