= Sedgwick Museum of Earth Sciences =

The Sedgwick Museum of Earth Sciences
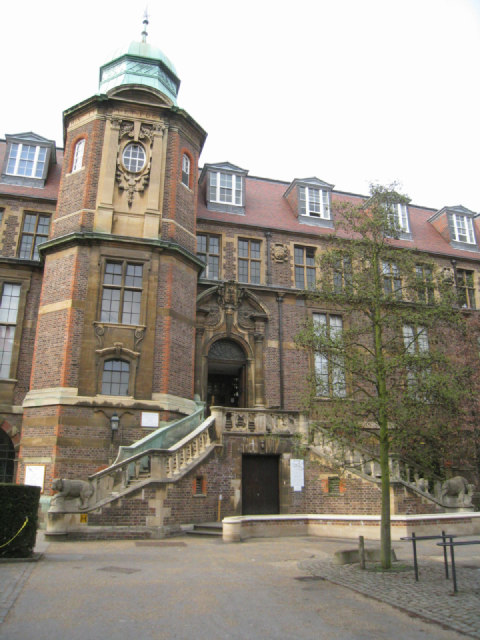
- Established: 1912
- Location: Downing Street, Cambridge, England, United Kingdom CB2 3EQ
- Coordinates: 52.20295°N 0.12206°E
- Type: Science museum
- Collection size: 1.5 million specimens
- Visitors: 168,021 (2019)
- Director: Dr. Liz Hide
- Website: sedgwickmuseum.cam.ac.uk

University of Cambridge Museums
- Fitzwilliam Museum; Kettle's Yard; Museum of Archaeology and Anthropology; Museum of Classical Archaeology; Whipple Museum of the History of Science; Sedgwick Museum of Earth Sciences; The Polar Museum; Museum of Zoology

The Sedgwick Museum of Earth Sciences, is the geology museum of the University of Cambridge. It is part of the Department of Earth Sciences and is located on the university's Downing Site in Downing Street, central Cambridge, England. The Sedgwick Museum is the oldest of the eight museums which make up the University of Cambridge Museums consortium.

== History ==
=== Construction and opening ===
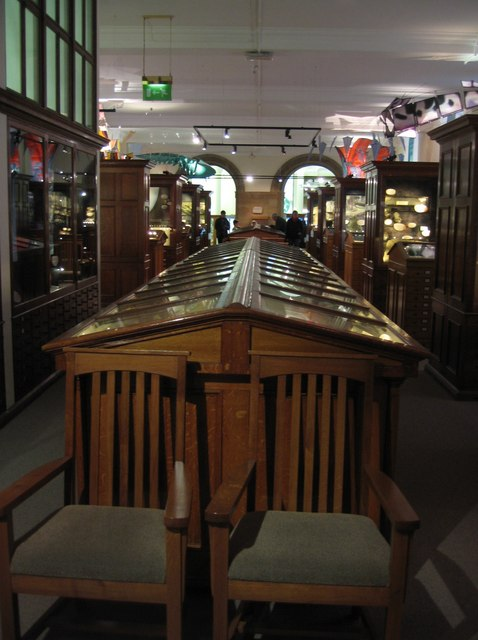
Inside the museum (October 2008)

Dr John Woodward collected and catalogued over 35 years nearly 10,000 specimens in five walnut cabinets, two of which he bequeathed to the university in his will. The university later purchased another two, and the fifth was added in the 1840s. The cabinets are still in use today. He also left funds to establish the position of the Woodwardian Professor of Geology.

Adam Sedgwick began the process of expanding the collection, and purchased several ichthyosaur skeletons from Mary Anning. He persuaded the university to set aside space in the Cockerill Building, but by the time he died, the collection was too large for that space, so it was decided there should be a museum set up in his memory.

Construction of the Sedgwick Museum was supervised by Thomas McKenny Hughes, an astute negotiator who persuaded the university to build the museum, and raised over £95,000 by a public appeal. The museum was opened on 1 March 1904 in a ceremony attended by King Edward VII.

== Collections ==
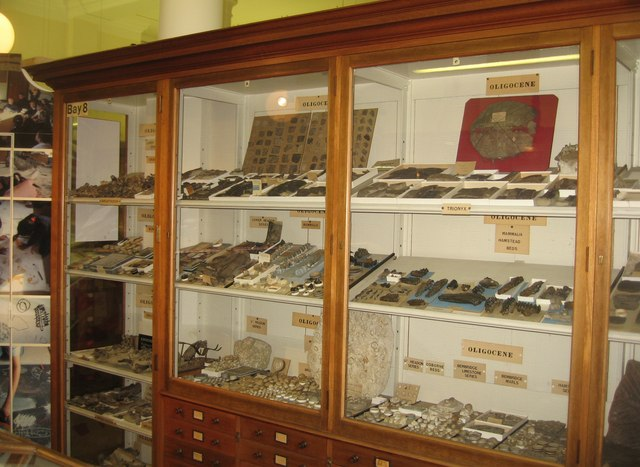
The Oligocene period

The Sedgwick has a collection of around 2 million rocks, minerals and fossils, spanning a period of 4.5 billion years. They are an important international resource for research, learning and enjoyment. They are not yet all available to search online but information about the collections is available on a number of sites via the museum's website.

The Mineral Collections contain 40,000 - 55,000 mineral specimens from across the world, and more than 400 meteorite specimens. In most cases, a hand specimen of the rock is accompanied by a thin section. The strengths of the collection reflect current and historical research interests, and include Cornish and Cumbrian minerals and specimens from the Binntal of Switzerland. Examples from this collection are on display in the Mineral Gallery

The 'Beagle' Collection comprises approximately 2000 rocks and a few fossils collected by Charles Darwin during his voyage around the world on HMS Beagle between 1831 and 1836.

The Harker Collection of igneous and metamorphic rocks is named after leading petrologist Alfred Harker who spent many years organising and cataloguing the collection.

The Maurice Black Sedimentary Petrology Collection consists of around 32,000 rock specimens and petrological thin sections.

The Sedgwick Museum Archive Collection includes papers charting the history and development of the museum, as well as the Sedgwick Club, the oldest student-run geological society in the world. The Archive also includes Adam Sedgwick's field notebooks, sketchbooks and specimen catalogues.

The A. G. Brighton Building is a purpose-built geological conservation laboratory and collections store in West Cambridge. It was named for Albert George (known as Bertie or Peter) Brighton (1900-1988) who was the curator of the Sedgwick Museum from 1931, until his retirement in 1968. The Palaeontological Collection contains over 1 million fossils from across the world.

== Exhibitions ==
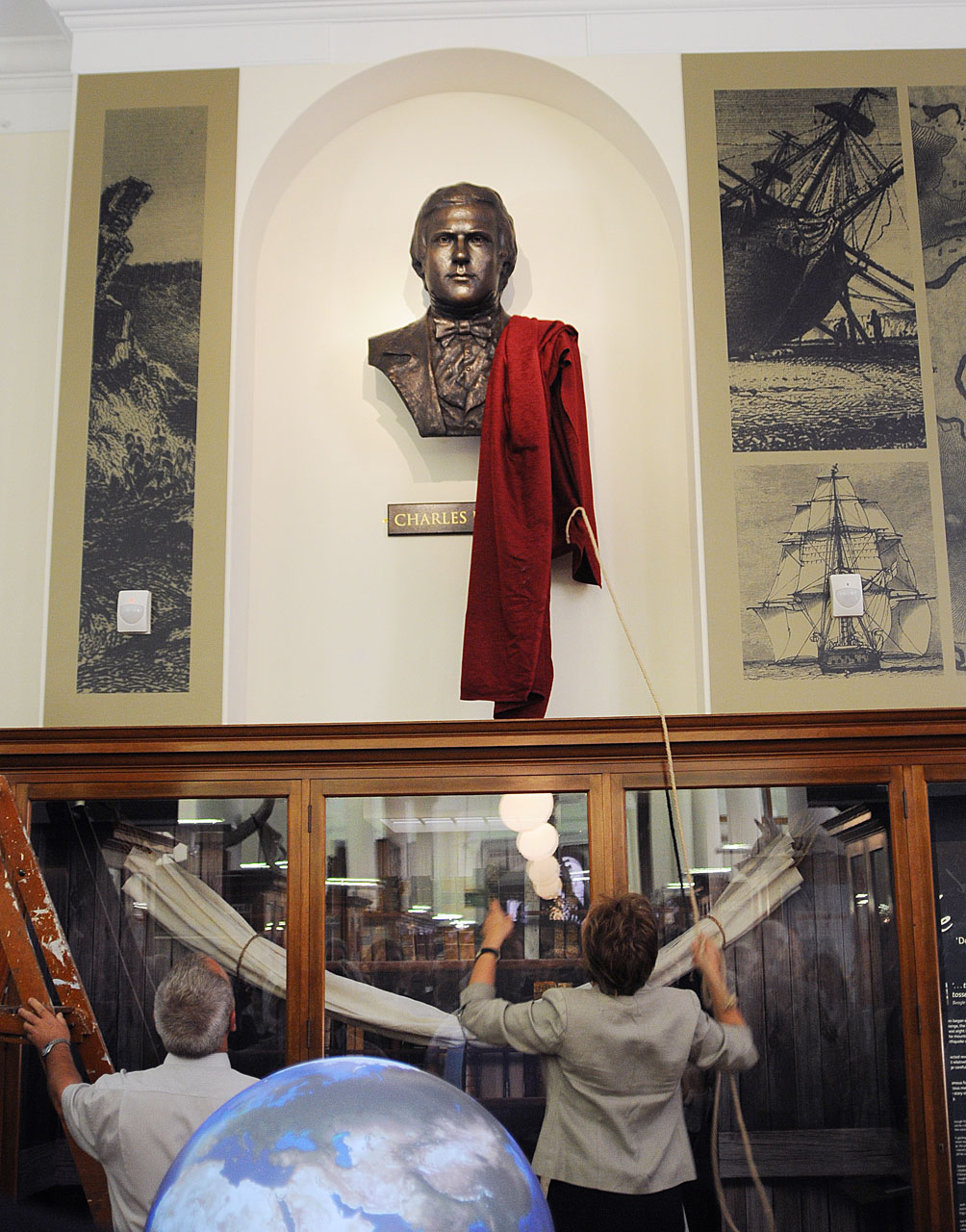
Unveiling of the Young Darwin bust at the museum in March 2009

In 2009 the museum curated a large exhibition on Darwin the Geologist to coincide with the Darwin bicentenary celebrations. The exhibition focused on Darwin's early geological research and displayed many of the specimens collected during the Beagle voyage. The launch of the exhibition also saw the unveiling of a large portrait bust of the young Darwin. The sculpture was created by the sculptor Anthony Smith and unveiled by Darwin historian Janet Browne.

== Public access ==
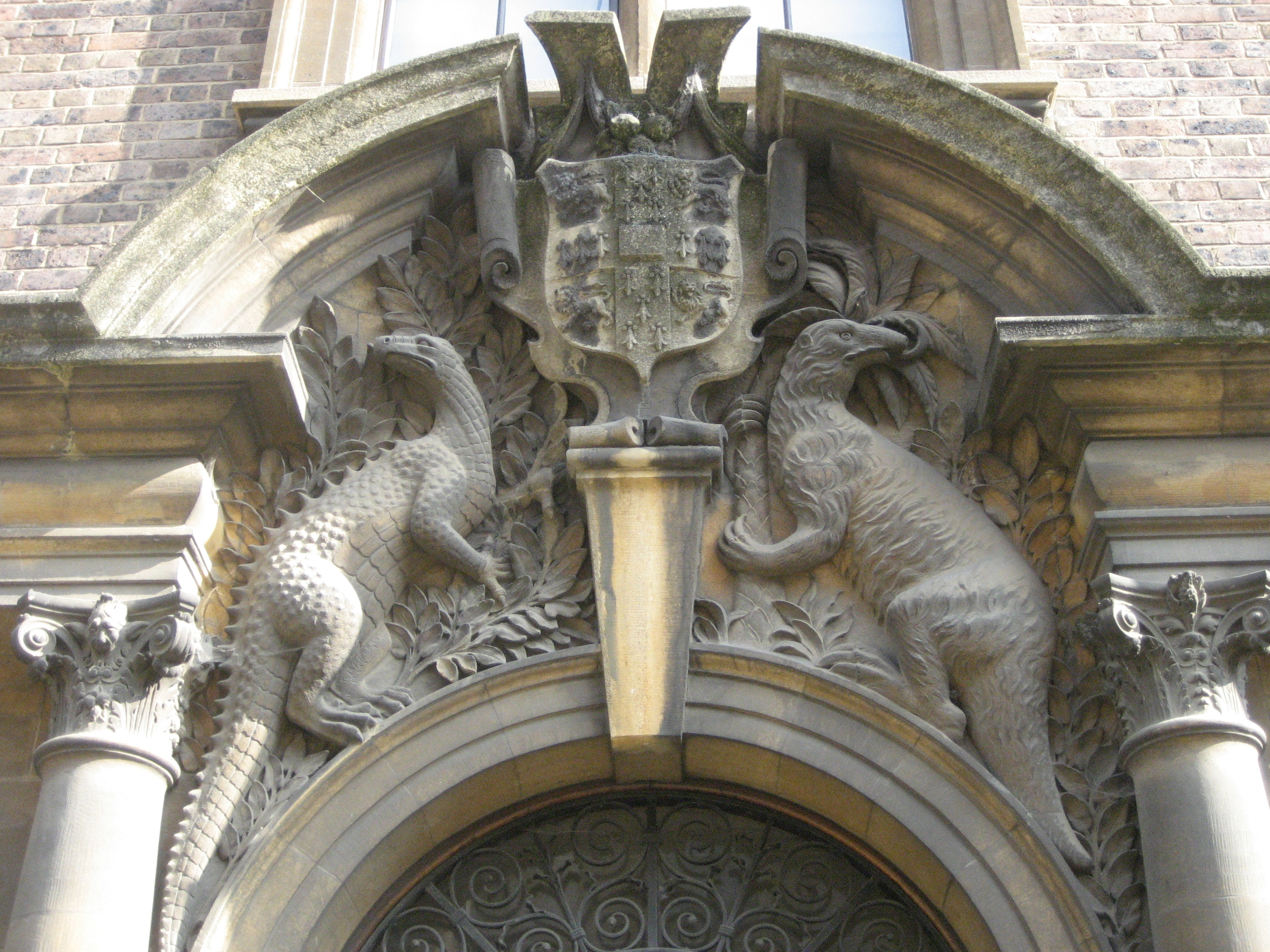
Relief of two prehistoric creatures (the Iguanodon on the left of image and the Megatherium on the right)

Admission is free to the Sedgwick Museum for all visitors. The museum is open 10am - 5pm Monday to Friday, and 10am - 4pm on Saturdays. It is currently open on some Bank Holidays but closed on Sundays. Groups are asked to book. The Sedgwick is an important venue for widening interest in Earth Sciences and regularly participates in Cambridge-wide events such as the Cambridge Science Festival and Twilight at the Museums. It puts on activities for families and individuals as well as temporary exhibitions, workshops and other events.

The museum logo is based on the Iguanodon skeleton displayed by the entrance. A display board explains that the skeleton is incorrectly mounted in an upright posture rather than a horizontal one but as the upright posture is widely recognised on the logo it was decided to leave the specimen and logo as they are.

== See also ==
- Category:Geology organizations
