= Albert George Brighton =

British palaeontologist (1900–1988)

Albert George Brighton (1900–1988) was a British museum curator and palaeontologist.

== Early life ==
Brighton was born in London, England on 29 December 1900, the son of George Preston Brighton, a gardener and his wife. He was educated at St Leonard's School, Streatham and later Westminster City School in London. He won a scholarship to attend Christ College, Cambridge in 1919. He was in the first class in part 1 of the Natural Sciences Tripos in 1921, and took a second class degree in geology in 1921. He shared the Wiltshire Prize.

== Career ==
Following graduation, Brighton pursued palaeontological research at Cambridge, paying for this study with supervising positions he gained in the Colleges. He published his first paper on Cretaceous Echinoids from Nigeria in 1925, and studied the collections of the Sedgwick Museum of Earth Sciences. The Sedgwick Museum at the time was curated largely by volunteers and teaching staff from Cambridge, in particular W. B. R. King and Gertrude Elles. Brighton offered his services and his work in systematically ordering and sorting the existing collections. In 1931, a post as full-time curator was offered to Brighton. The salary was small however, and Brighton continued his teaching positions with the Department to supplement it.

Over half a million specimens had yet to be sorted and described when Brighton took the Curator's position in 1931. Brighton brought in a new system for cataloguing items, such that the first instance of an object's description would be noted for future reference and citation. Many of the staff at Cambridge preferred their existing methods of description. Dorothy Hill, who was undertaking her PhD under Elles’ supervision brought her collection of Carboniferous corals from Australia, and utilised Gertrude Elles’ system, necessitating a change in how the fossils were described and indexed at the Sedgwick. Brighton's goal was to catalogue 12,000 items a year. When he retired in 1968 he had catalogued almost 375,000 items over the course of 37 years. The collection became more accessible and was considered a highly desirable research collection to utilize.

Brighton was also involved in displaying and rotating the collections he came into contact with for public exhibition and the loan and exchange of objects and research queries. His position was raised to that of a lecturer in 1945, and he regularly taught classes to the Natural Sciences Tripos students. He was Department Librarian from 1952 to 1968. With the introduction of computers to record the contents of museum collection indexes from the 1960s, Brighton's logic made easy work of the translation of his index cards to machine retrieval systems.

Brighton retired in 1968 and died on 9 April 1988 in Cambridge.

== Legacy ==
The A.G. Brighton medal, established in 1989, is awarded every three years to honour a candidate who either works with geological specimens or has led to improvements in the use of them in teaching.

The A.G. Brighton Building, a geological conservation laboratory, was named for Brighton at Cambridge in 1991.
