= Hills Road, Cambridge =

Road in Cambridge, England

Coordinates: 52°10′58″N 0°08′24″E

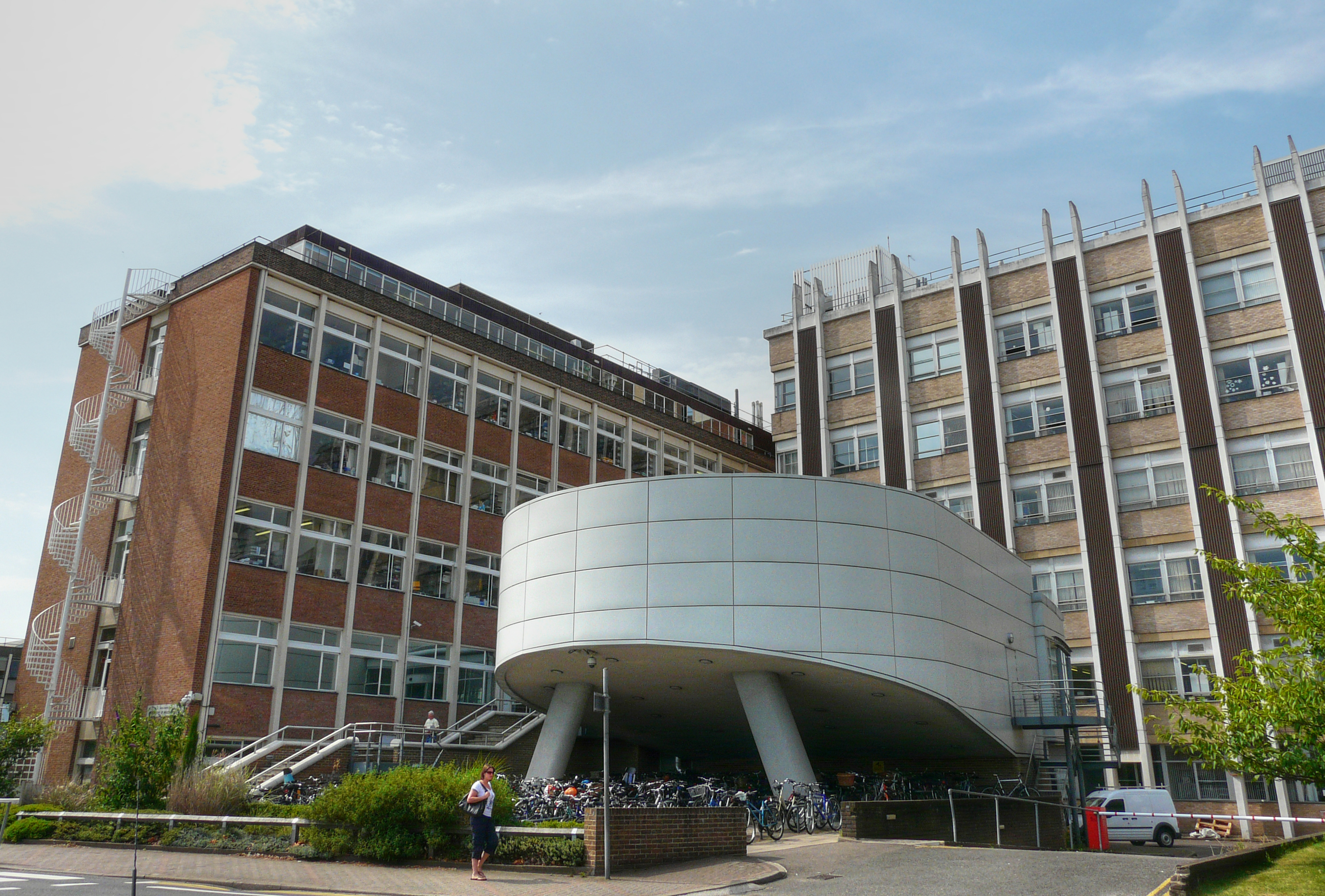
The Laboratory of Molecular Biology building on Hills Road, part of the University of Cambridge.

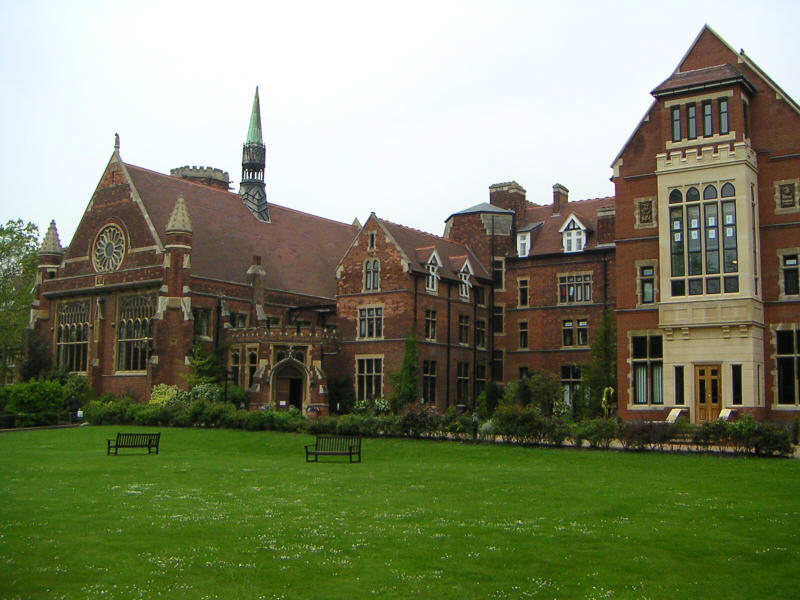
Homerton College, on Hills Road.

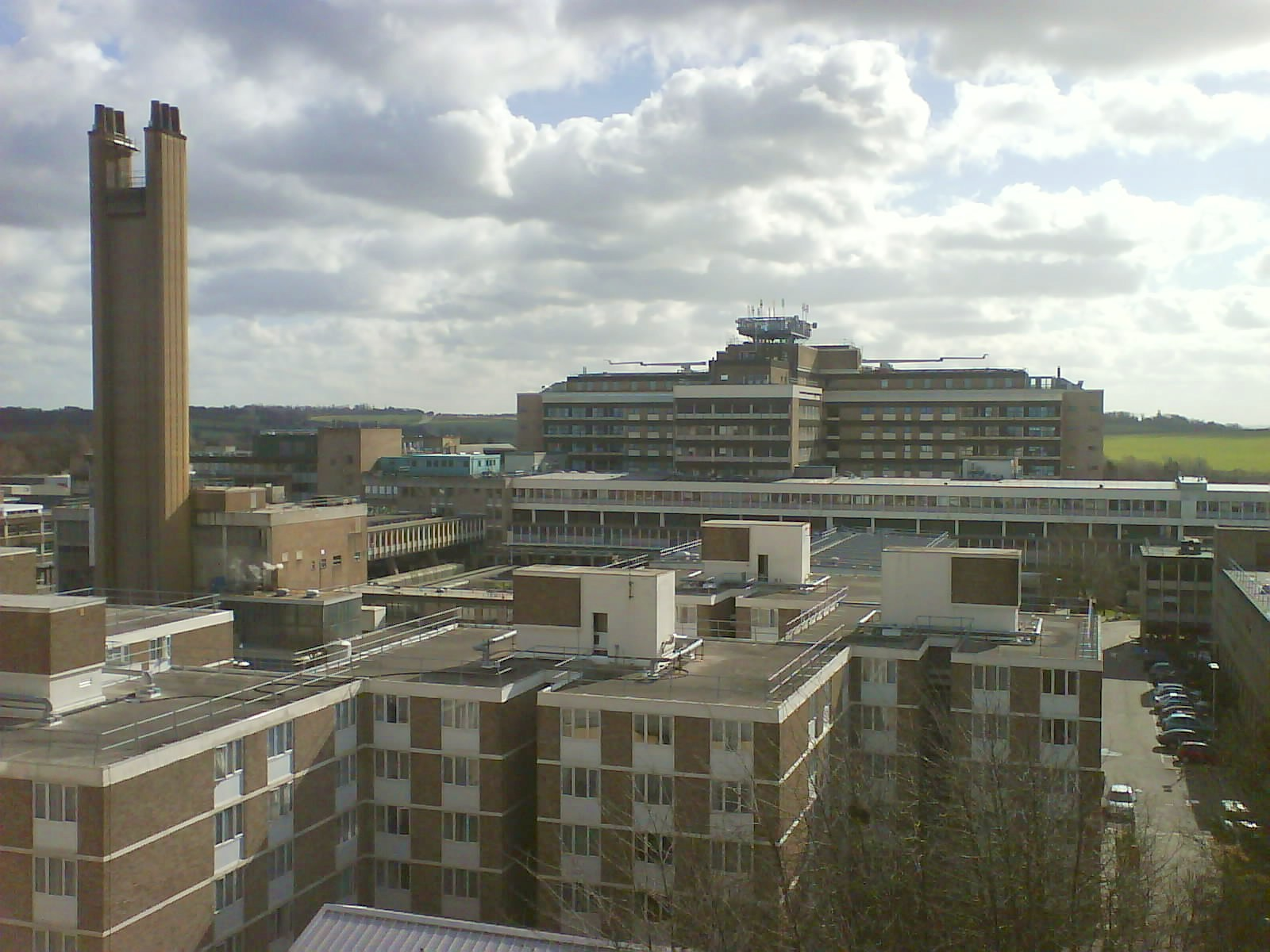
General view of Addenbrooke's Hospital at the southeastern end of Hills Road.

Hills Road is an arterial road (part of the A1307) in southeast Cambridge, England. It runs between Regent Street at the junction with Lensfield Road and Gonville Place (the A603) to the northwest and a roundabout by the Cambridge Biomedical Campus, continuing as Babraham Road (also part of the A1307) to the southeast.

On the corner with Lensfield Road is Our Lady and the English Martyrs Church. To the west of the road is the Cambridge University Botanic Garden. At this point, near the Cambridge War Memorial, Station Road leads to Cambridge railway station to the east. Near the southeast end to the west, just north of the junction with Long Road, is The Perse School, an independent school. The Cambridge Biomedical Campus is to the southwest of the roundabout at the southeastern end, at the edge of the city and houses Addenbrooke's Hospital. The original hospital was located on the Old Addenbrooke's Site on Trumpington Street in central Cambridge.

Also on Hills Road are:

- Homerton College, a constituent college of the University of Cambridge
- The Perse School
- Cambridge Cancer Genomics, a biotechnology company using artificial intelligence to tailor cancer therapies.
- Hills Road Sixth Form College
- St John the Evangelist church
