= Austin Friary, Cambridge =

Augustinian Priory in Cambridge, England

Coordinates: 52.2041°N 0.11908°E

Austin Friary (also known as the Augustinian Friary) was a priory in Cambridge, Cambridgeshire, England. The priory was located at Peas Hill in central Cambridge from around 1289 until dissolution in 1538.

== History ==
The order was founded in the mid-13th century and after being granted a small piece of land near Bene't Street in Cambridge at the end of the 13th century the Friary grew until it covered the site of the present New Museums Site all the way from the end of Peas Hill to Downing Street (then known as Dow Dyers Lane), and from Corn Exchange Street (Slaughter Lane) to Free School Lane (Luttburne Lane). Many of the Friars were also scholars in the University and in the early 16th century would meet in the White Horse Tavern – situated on the current Queens' Lane – also known as "Little Germany" as it became associated with the nascent Protestant movement.

The Friary's gatehouse was situated at the end of Peas Hill, around the location of the present 16 Bene't Street.

Robert Barnes and Myles Coverdale were both some time members of the Friary, before renouncing Catholicism for Lutheranism and Puritanism, respectively.

When John Leland visited the Friary's library shortly before its dissolution he wrote of five works by William Ockham, two by John Capgrave and a volume of sermons by Ralph the Almoner of Westminster. A volume of tracts, partly written by Adam de Stockton at Cambridge in 1375 and currently in Trinity College, Dublin is the only book known to have survived from the library.

In the centuries after it was closed in the 1530s, the site changed hands many times. Maps of the late-16th century (up to 1592) continue to depict the Friary. The last of the original Friary buildings – the infirmary or guest hall – was demolished in the 1790s. Some of the fabric was incorporated into buildings on the New Museums Site.
