= Trumpington Street =

Street in central Cambridge, England

Coordinates: 52.2009°N 0.1192°E

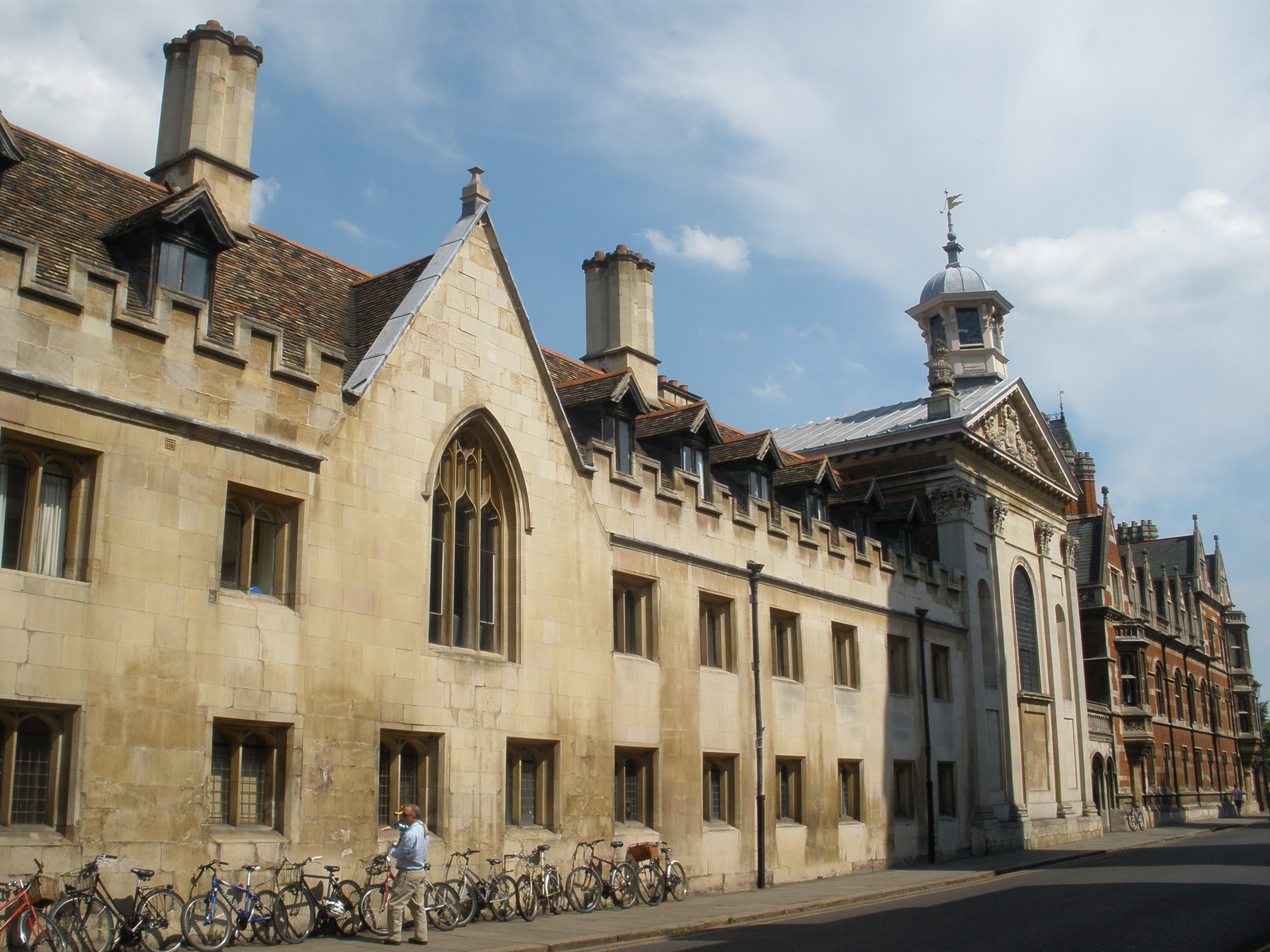
The Trumpington Street façade of Pembroke College, with the chapel on the right, the first building to be built by Sir Christopher Wren

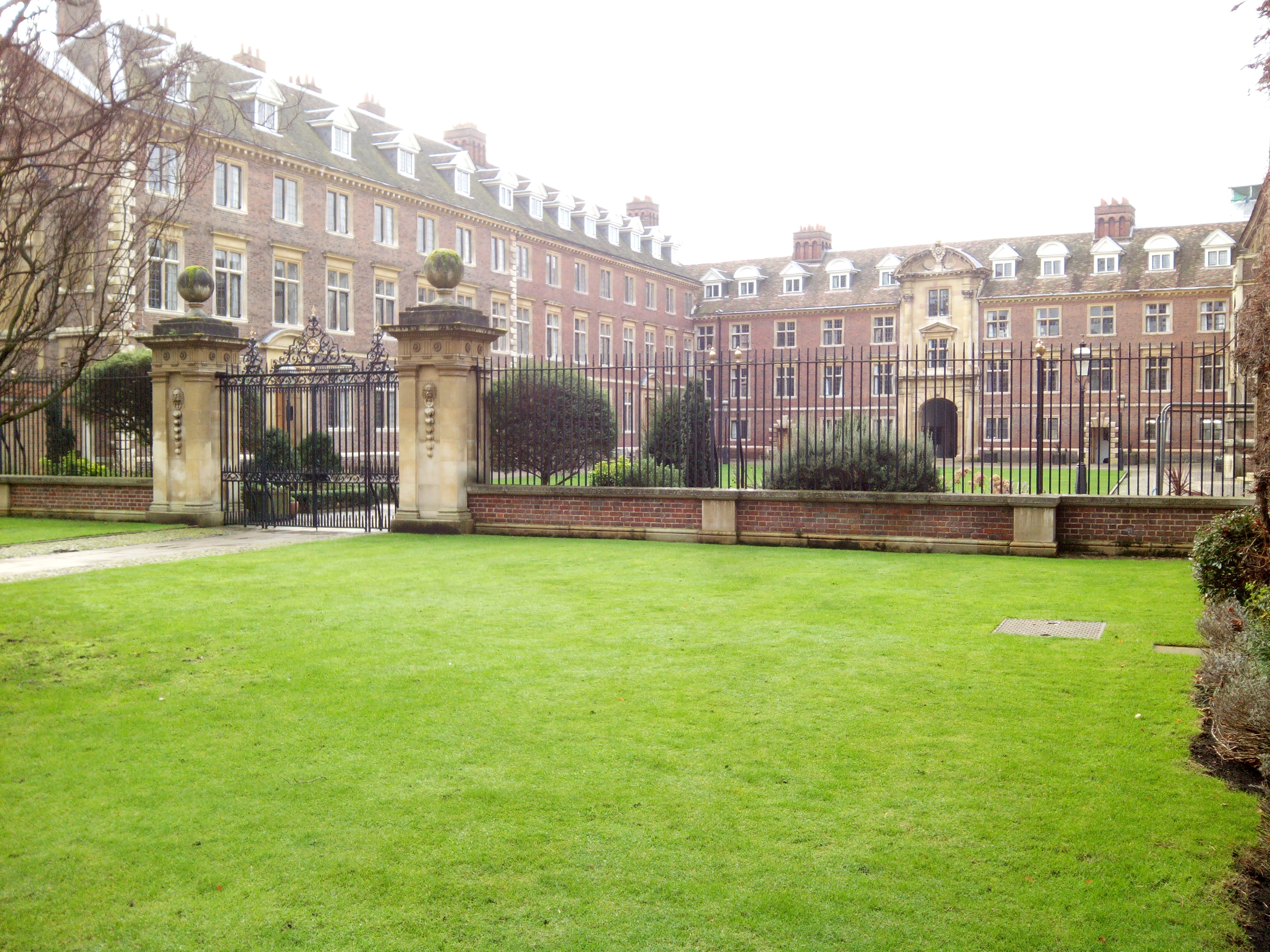
St Catharine's College viewed from Trumpington Street, showing the open court

Trumpington Street is a major historic street in central Cambridge, England. At the north end it continues as King's Parade where King's College is located. To the south it continues as Trumpington Road (the A1134), an arterial route out of Cambridge, at the junction with Lensfield Road.

== History ==
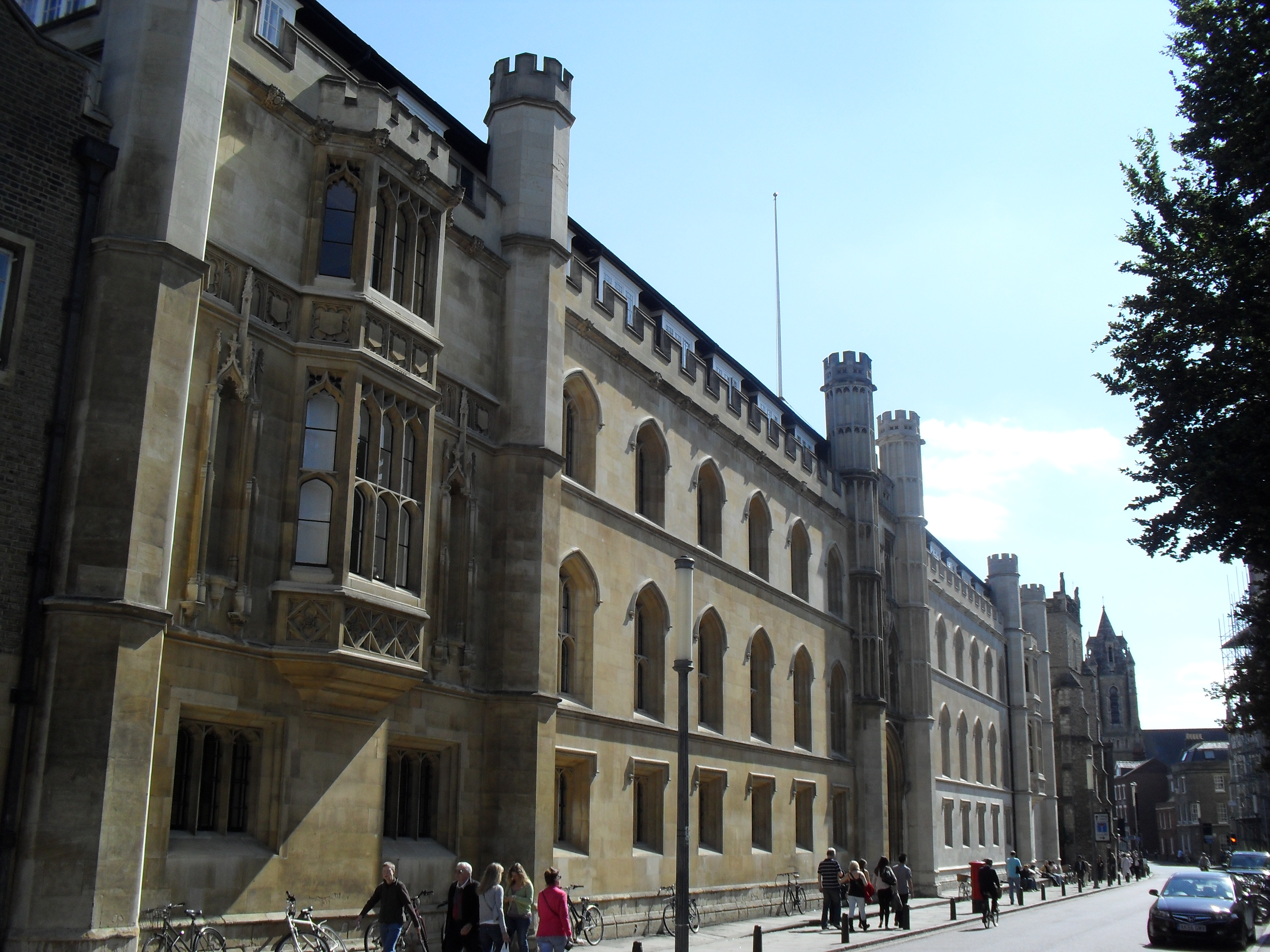
Corpus Christi College New Court seen from Trumpington Street

In 1361, at Spittle End, the leper hospital of St Anthony and St Eligius was founded. Addenbrooke's Hospital was founded in 1766 on Trumpington Street, but it has since relocated to larger premises further out of the city. The Cambridge Judge Business School is now on the original site of the hospital, the Old Addenbrooke's Site.

Until the 19th century, Trumpington Street was at the edge of development to the south of Cambridge.

== Notable buildings ==
The University of Cambridge colleges St Catharine's College, Corpus Christi College, Pembroke College, and Peterhouse are all on Trumpington Street. Pembroke College also fronts onto the adjoining Pembroke Street. Further south is Fitzwilliam Museum, the main museum of the university. At the southern end is the main site of the Cambridge University Engineering Department.

Little St Mary's Parish Church, is next to Peterhouse (just to the north) on the corner of Trumpington Street and Little St Mary's Lane. The first church here was called St Peter-without-Trumpington Gate. The former Emmanuel United Reformed Church building, built to a design of James Cubitt in 1875, is also located on Trumpington Street; this now forms part of Pembroke College's Mill Lane Project development site.

At the northern end on the corner of Corpus Christi College facing King's Parade is the Corpus Clock, a new artwork installed in 2008.

== Hobson's Conduit ==
The Trumpington Street branch of Hobson's Conduit still functions as sluices along each side of the street. At this point, it is known as the Pem (east side) and Pot (west side). The Cambridge City Council's Drainage Engineer controls flow through the sluices and generally lets water flow in the open conduits in the street between the months of April and September. Feeds run into Peterhouse and Pembroke College. A run also used to feed into the basement of the old Addenbrooke's Hospital, now the Judge Business School.

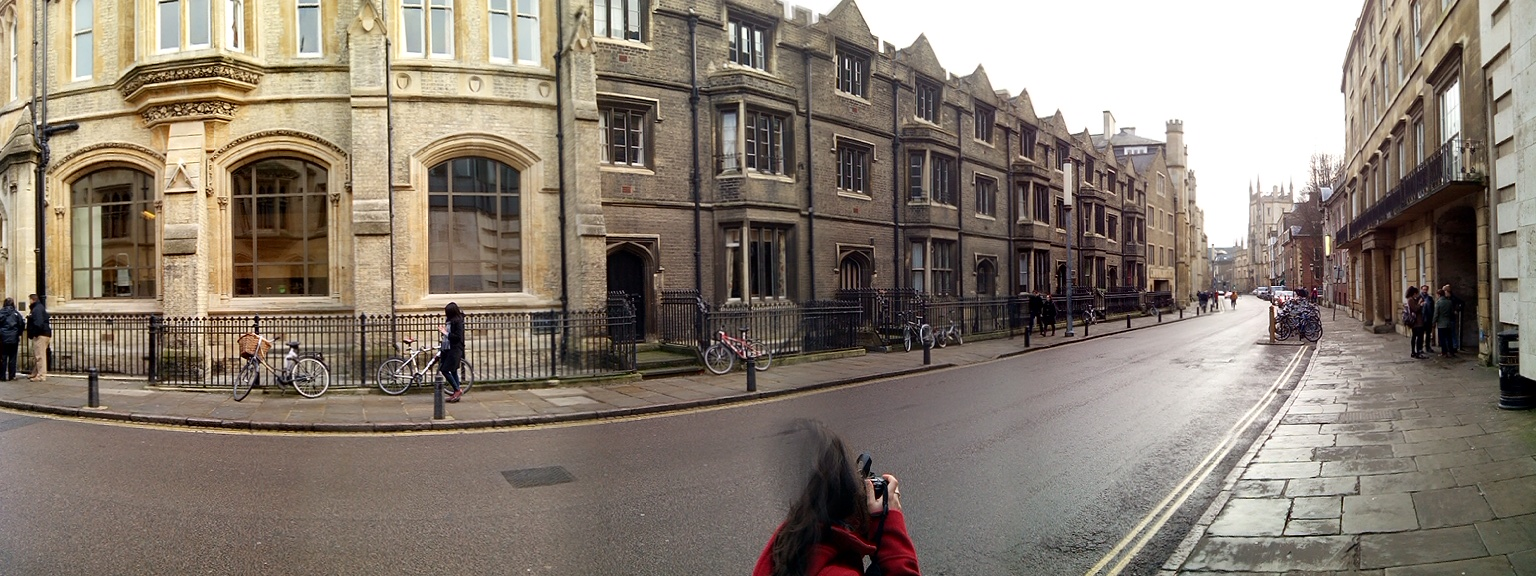
Trumpington Street, Corpus Christi College.

== Gallery ==
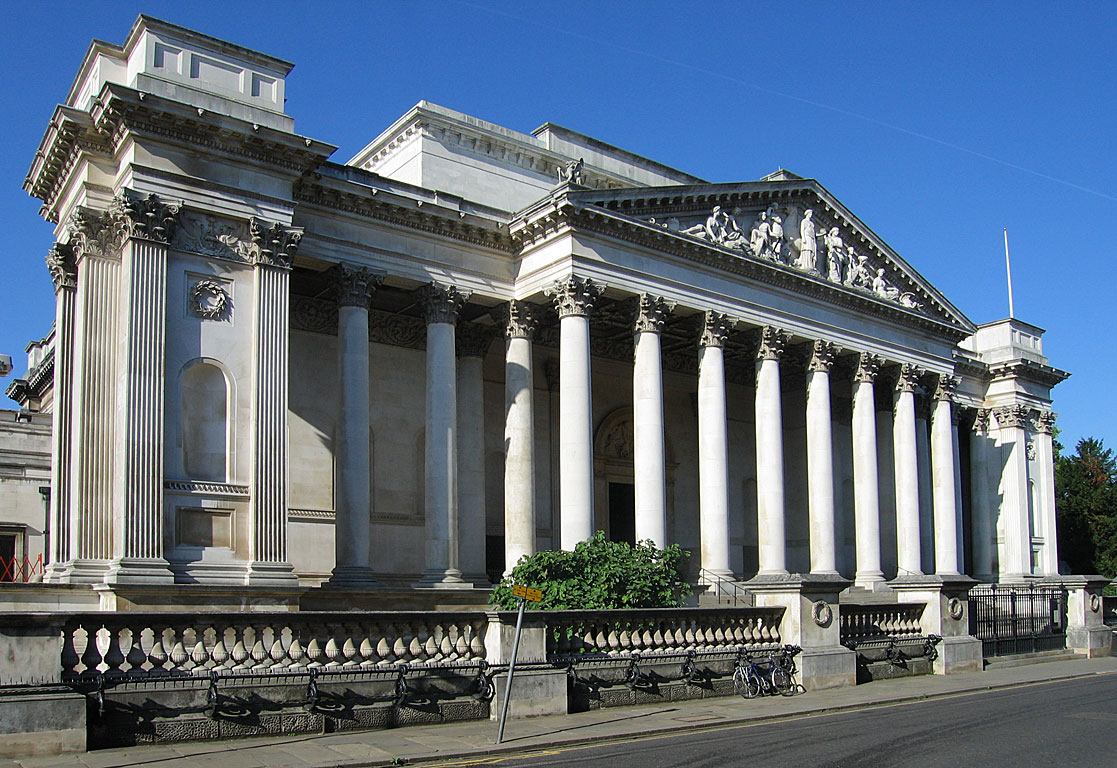
The main entrance of the Fitzwilliam Museum, facing Trumpington Street.

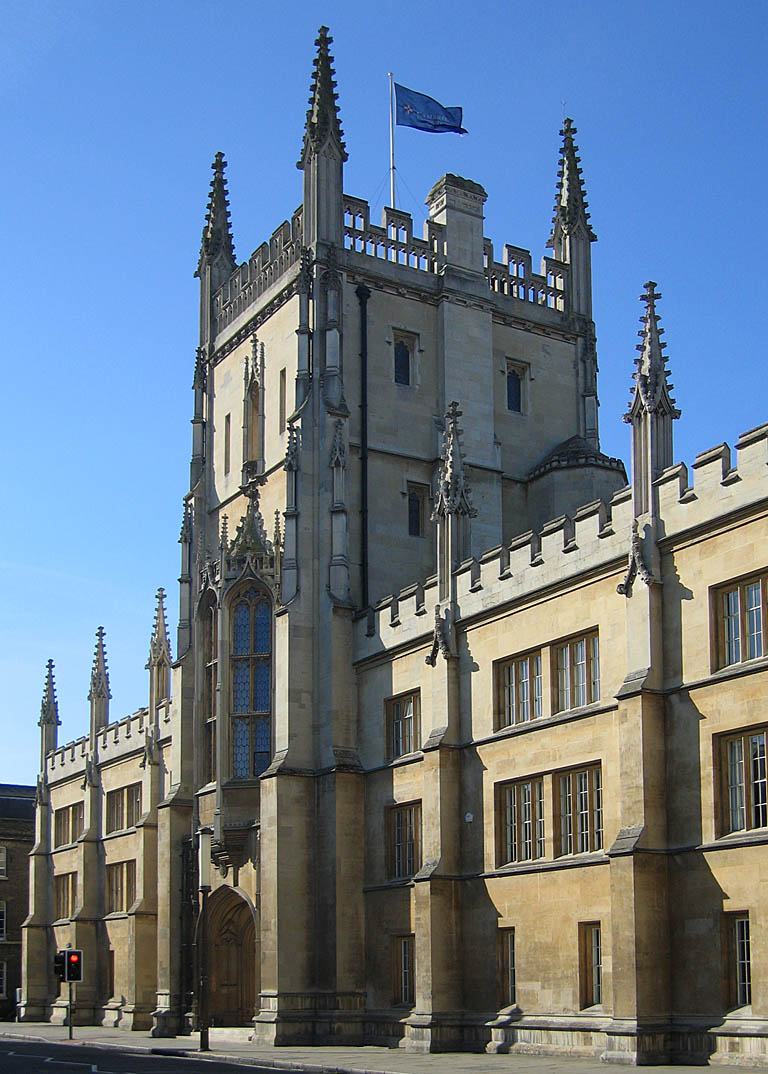
The Pitt Building, former headquarters of the Cambridge University Press, on Trumpington Street.

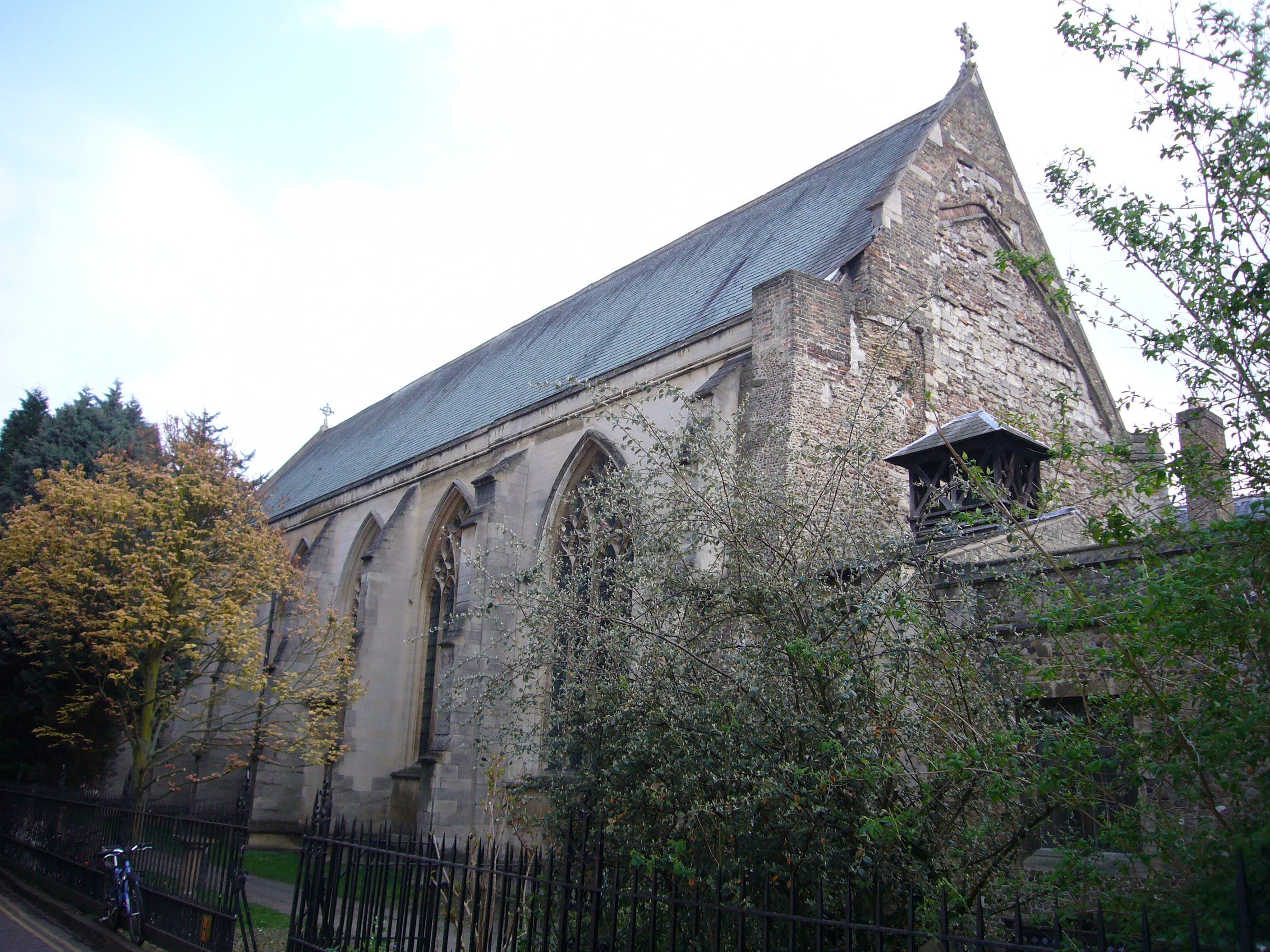
Little St Mary's Church, on the corner of Little St Mary's Lane and Trumpington Street.

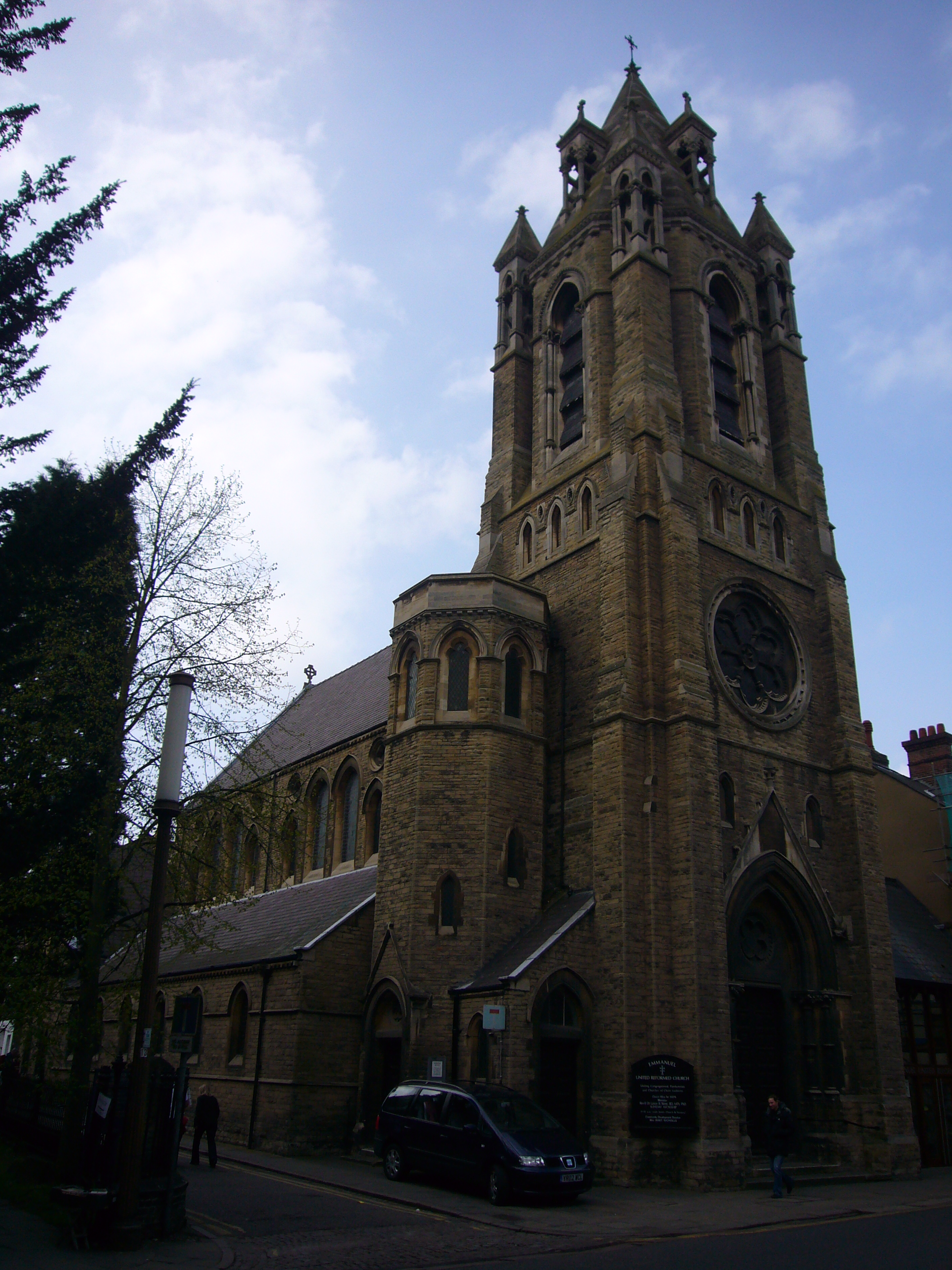
The former Emmanuel United Reformed Church building (now part of Pembroke College) on Trumpington Street.

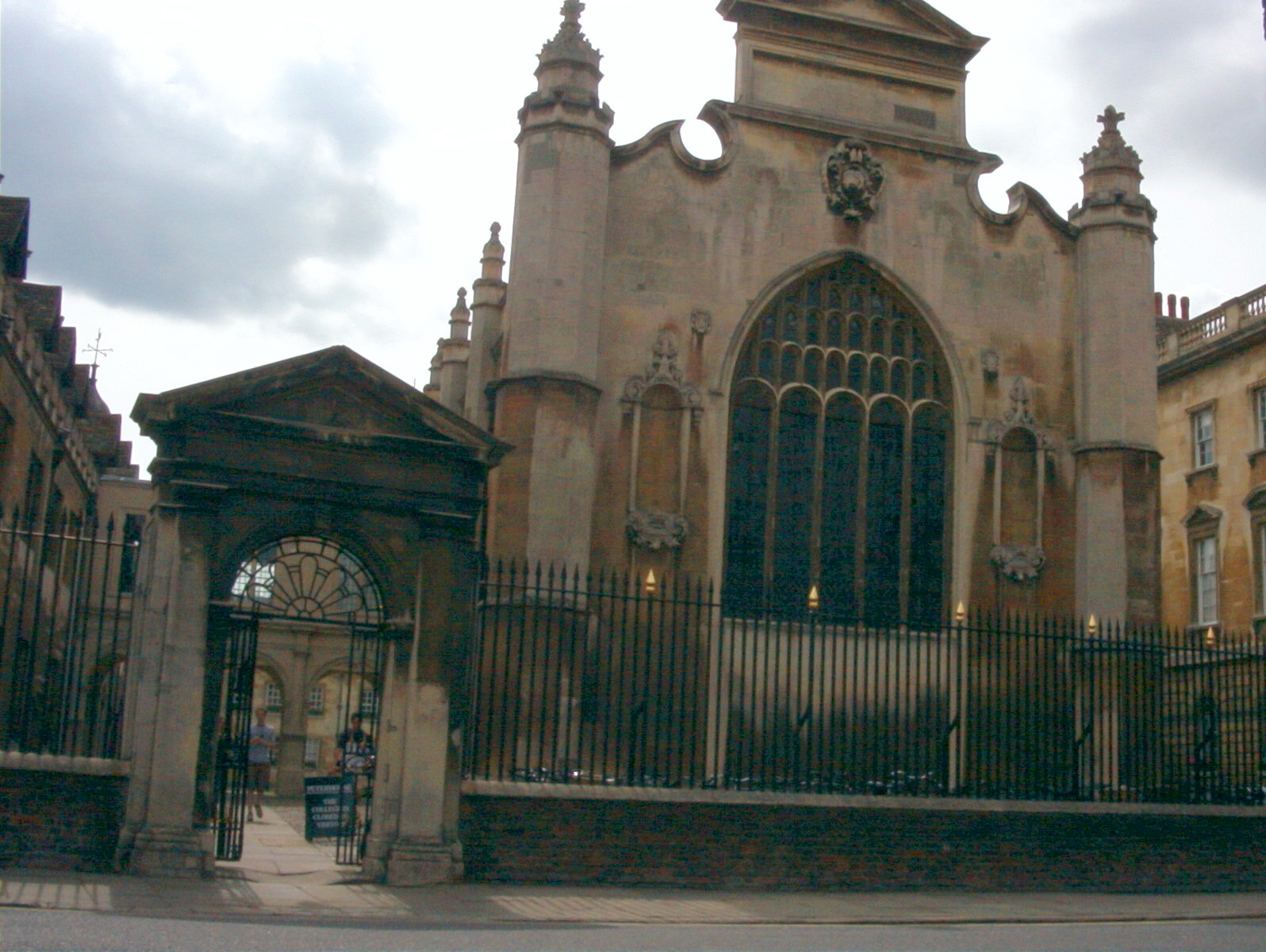
Front of the college Peterhouse on Trumpington Street.

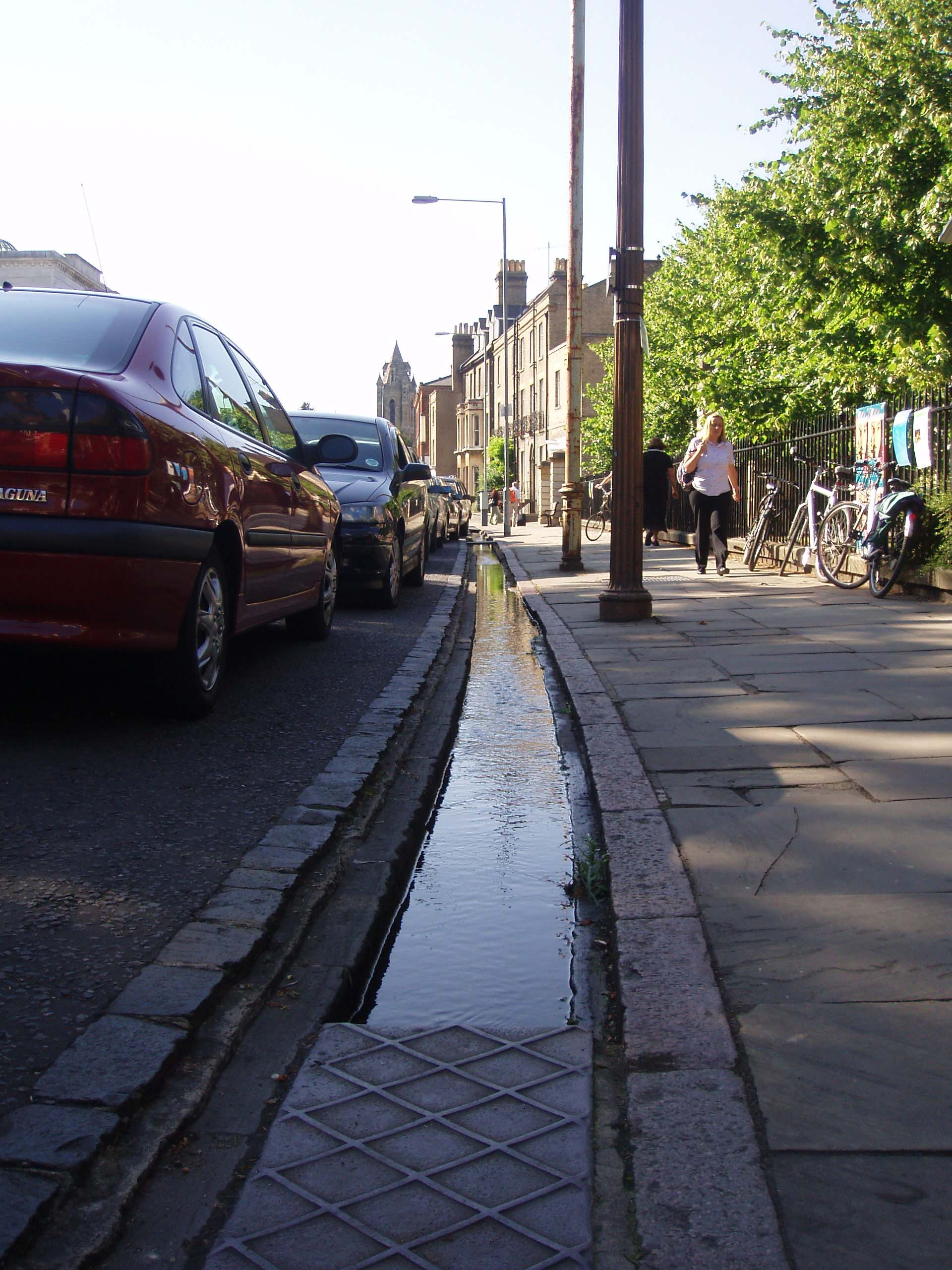
Hobson's Conduit running in a sluice along the street towards Peterhouse.
