= Lensfield Road =

Road in Cambridge, England

Coordinates: 52°11′54″N 0°07′32″E

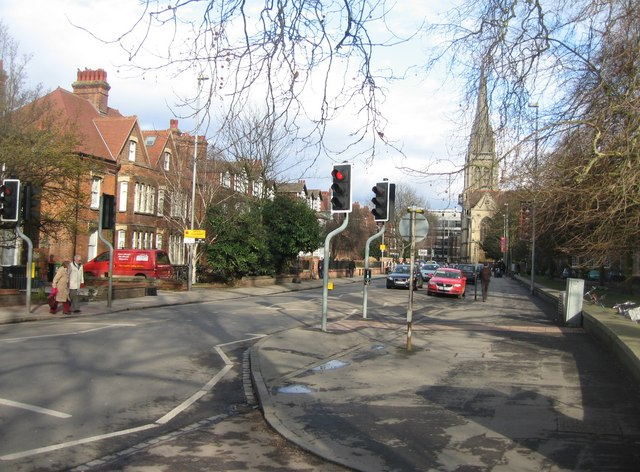
View along Lensfield Road.

Lensfield Road is a road (part of the A603) in southeast central Cambridge, England. It runs between the junction of Trumpington Street and Trumpington Road to the west and the junction of Regent Street and Hills Road to the west. It continues as Gonville Place to the northeast past Parker's Piece, a large grassy area with footpaths.

On the south side of the road are the Scott Polar Research Institute, St Alban's Primary School and the University of Cambridge's Yusuf Hamied Department of Chemistry. On the corner with Hills Road is Our Lady and the English Martyrs Church.

To the north between Tennis Court Road and Regent Street is one of the larger University of Cambridge colleges, Downing College, which owns many properties on the road. This area used to be known as Pembroke Leys, a boggy area south of medieval Cambridge. Between Trumpington Street and Tennis Court Road to the north is the Old Addenbrooke's Site, where Addenbrooke's Hospital was located before it moved further out of Cambridge to the southeast at the end of Hills Road (on the edge of the city).

== Hobson's Conduit ==
The St Andrew's Street branch of Hobson's Conduit was added in 1631, providing a water supply for the eastern part of the city. It flowed from the conduit east along Lensfield Road, then north along Regent Terrace, and on to St Andrew's Street in the centre of the city.

A major fire in 1849 meant that a new fountain for the Market Place branch of Hobson's Conduit was erected in 1855. The previous structure was moved to the corner of Lensfield Road and Trumpington Road in 1856 as a monument to Thomas Hobson.

== Gallery ==
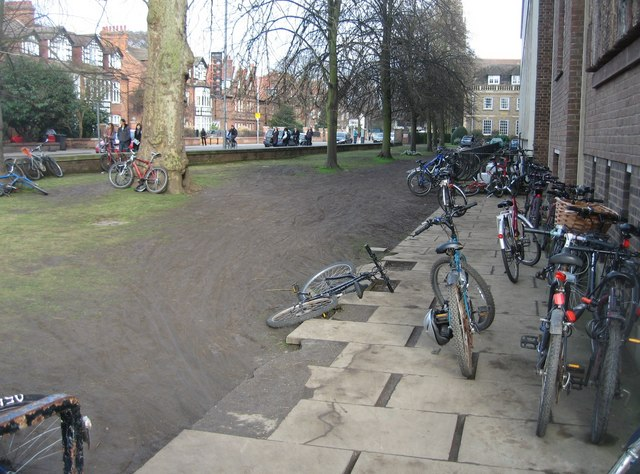
Bicycles outside the University of Cambridge's Department of Chemistry on Lensfield Road.

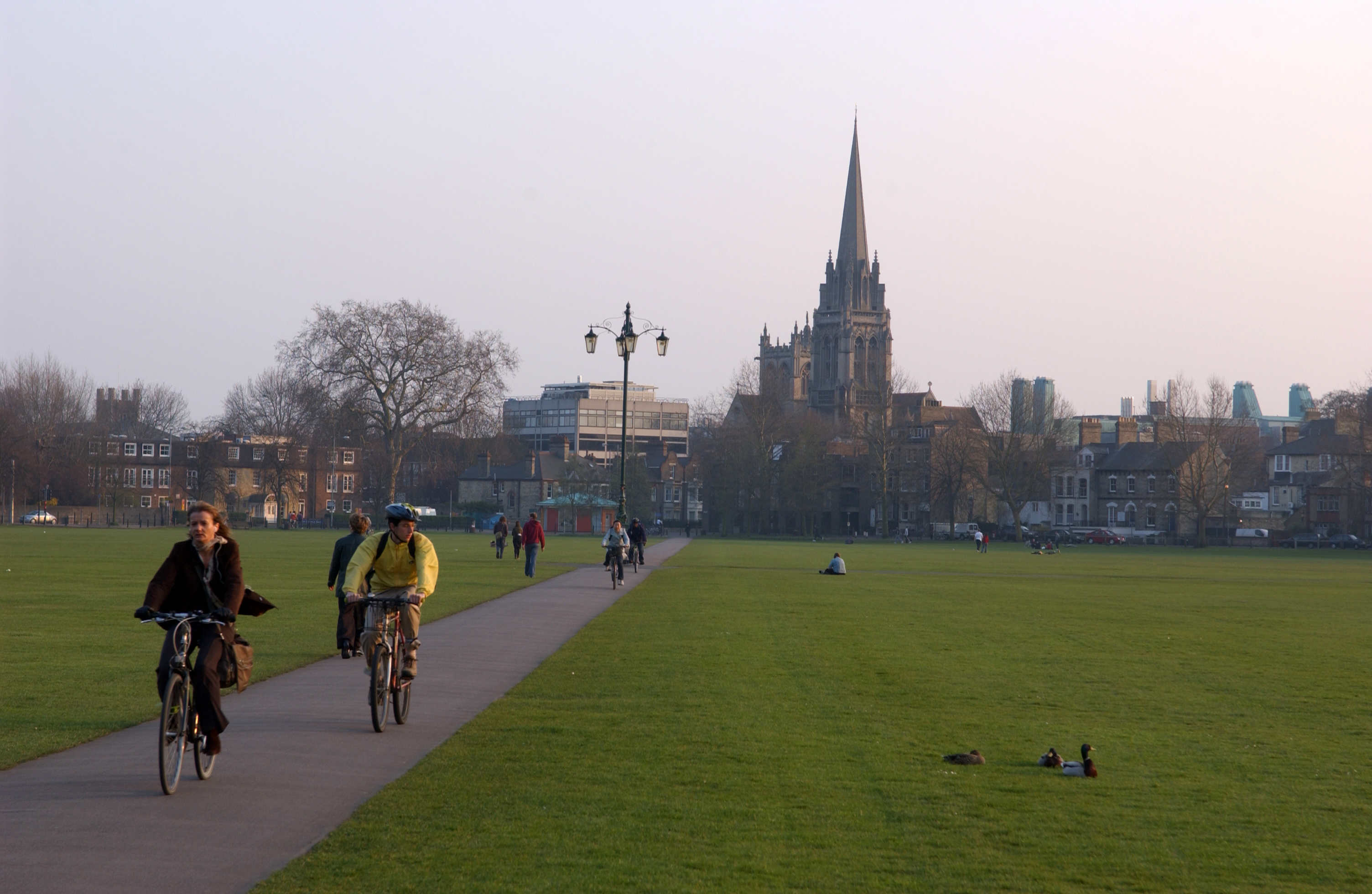
A view of Parker's Piece looking towards Our Lady and the English Martyrs Church at the junction of Hills Road and Lensfield Road.

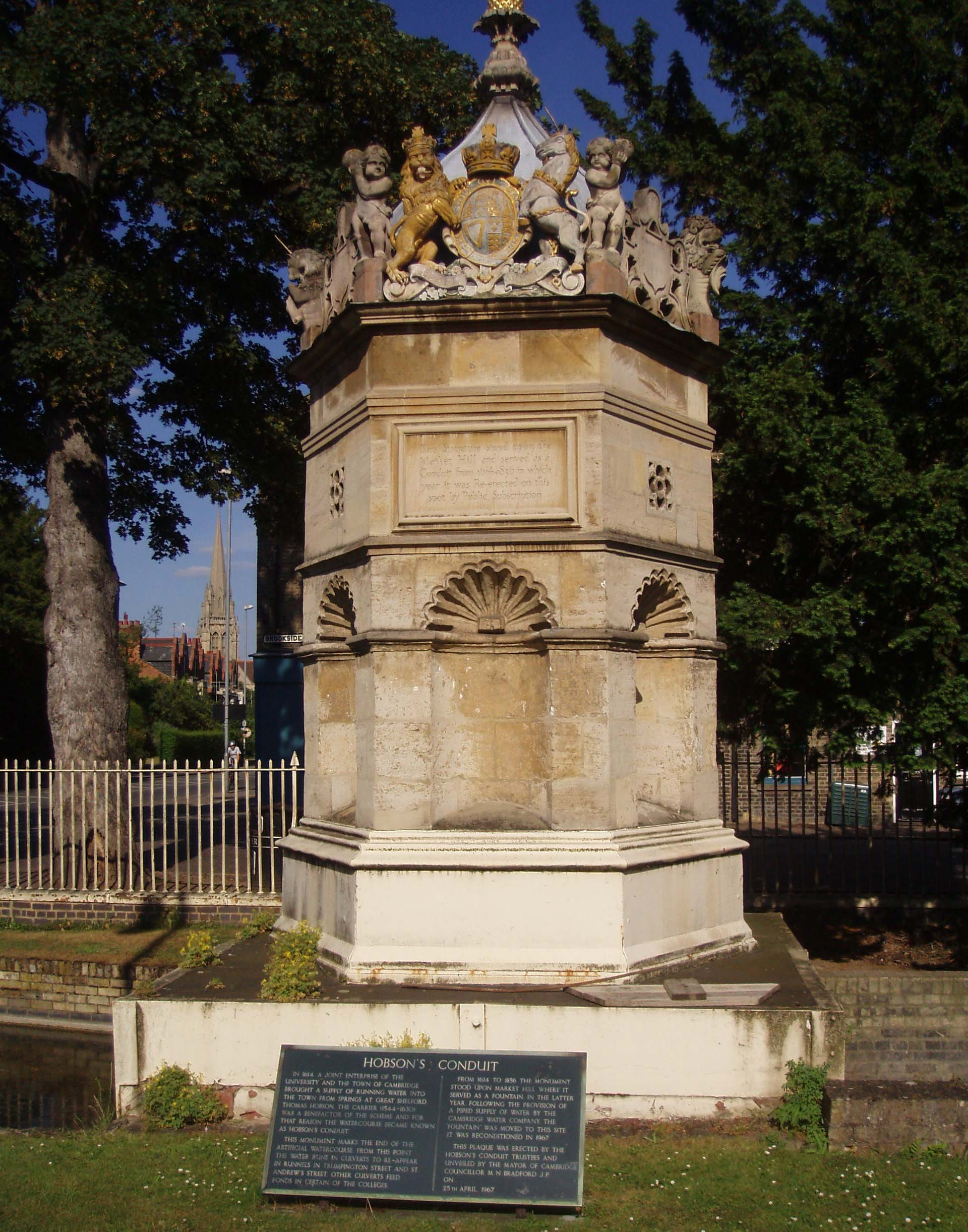
Monument to Thomas Hobson, at the point where the conduit crosses Lensfield Road, at its eastern end.

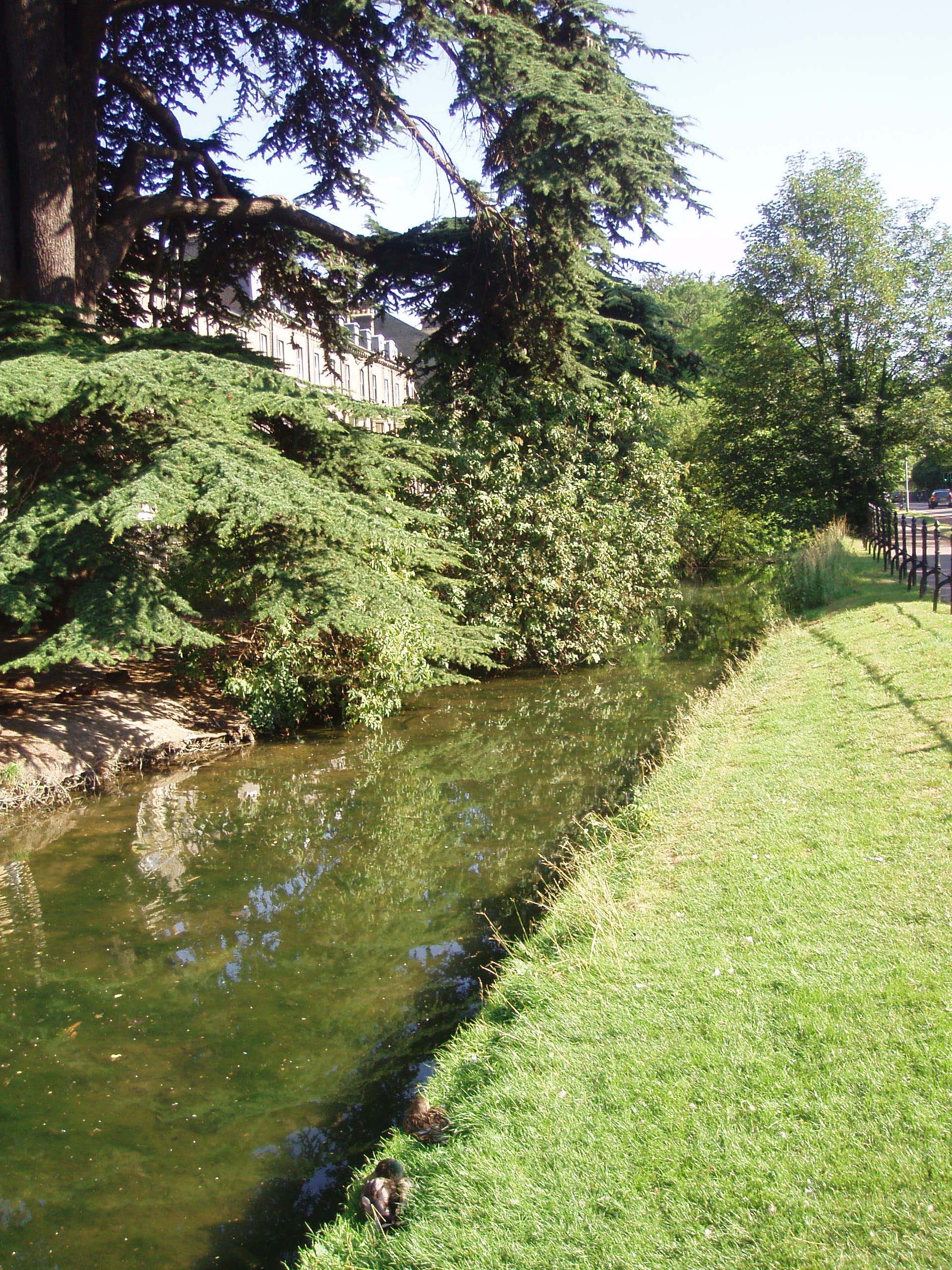
Hobson's Conduit at the end of Brookside, off Lensfield Road.
