= Regent Street, Cambridge =

Street in Cambridge, United Kingdom

Coordinates: 52.2009°N 0.1259°E

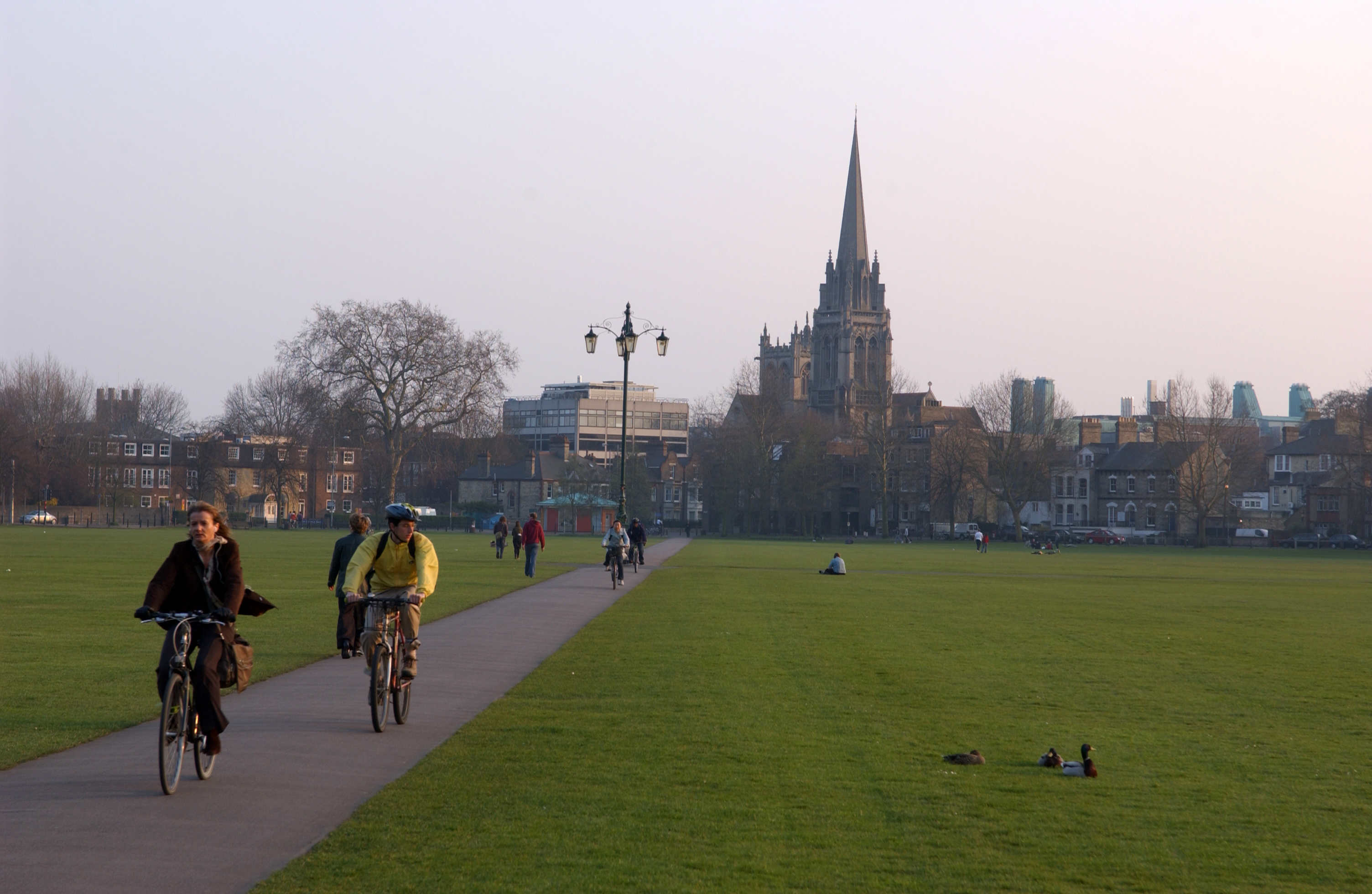
A view on Parker's Piece looking towards Our Lady and the English Martyrs Church at the junction of Hills Road with Regent Street.

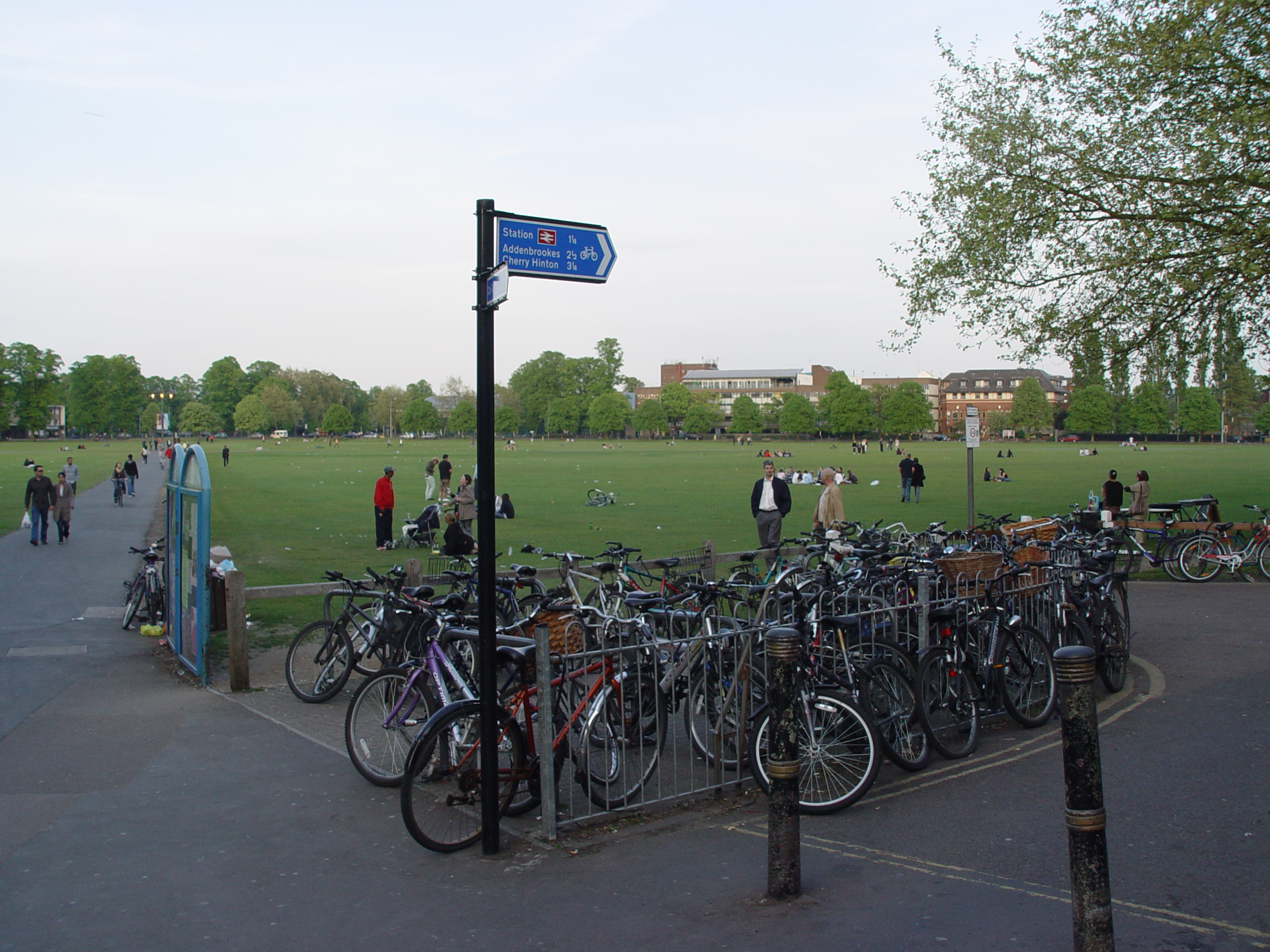
A view of Parker's Piece from the north end of Regent Terrace (to the right).

Regent Street is an arterial street in southeast central Cambridge, England. It runs between St Andrew's Street, at the junction with Park Terrace, to the northwest and Hills Road at the junction with the A603 (Lensfield Road and Gonville Place) to the southeast. Regent Terrace runs in parallel immediately to the northeast. Beyond that is Parker's Piece, a large grassed area with footpaths.

On the southwestern side of the street is one of the larger University of Cambridge colleges, Downing College.

The St Andrew's Street branch of Hobson's Conduit was added in 1631, providing a water supply for the eastern part of the city. It flowed from the conduit head along Lensfield Road in the south of Cambridge, then Regent Terrace, and on to St Andrew's Street.

In 1871, Henry Sidgwick, a Fellow of Trinity, alongside Anne Clough (the first Principal of Newnham College) and Eleanor Balfour (Sidgwick's future wife) oversaw the purchase of 74 Regent Street to house five female students who wished to attend lectures but did not live near enough to the University to do so. The following year, this moved to Merton House on Queen's Road, and in 1875 the first building for Newnham College was built at the current site on Sidgwick Avenue.
