= Elizabeth Martha Beckley =

British astronomical photographer (1846–1927)

Elizabeth Martha Beckley (14 January 1846 – 6 August 1927) was a pioneering British astronomical photographer who worked at the Kew Observatory.

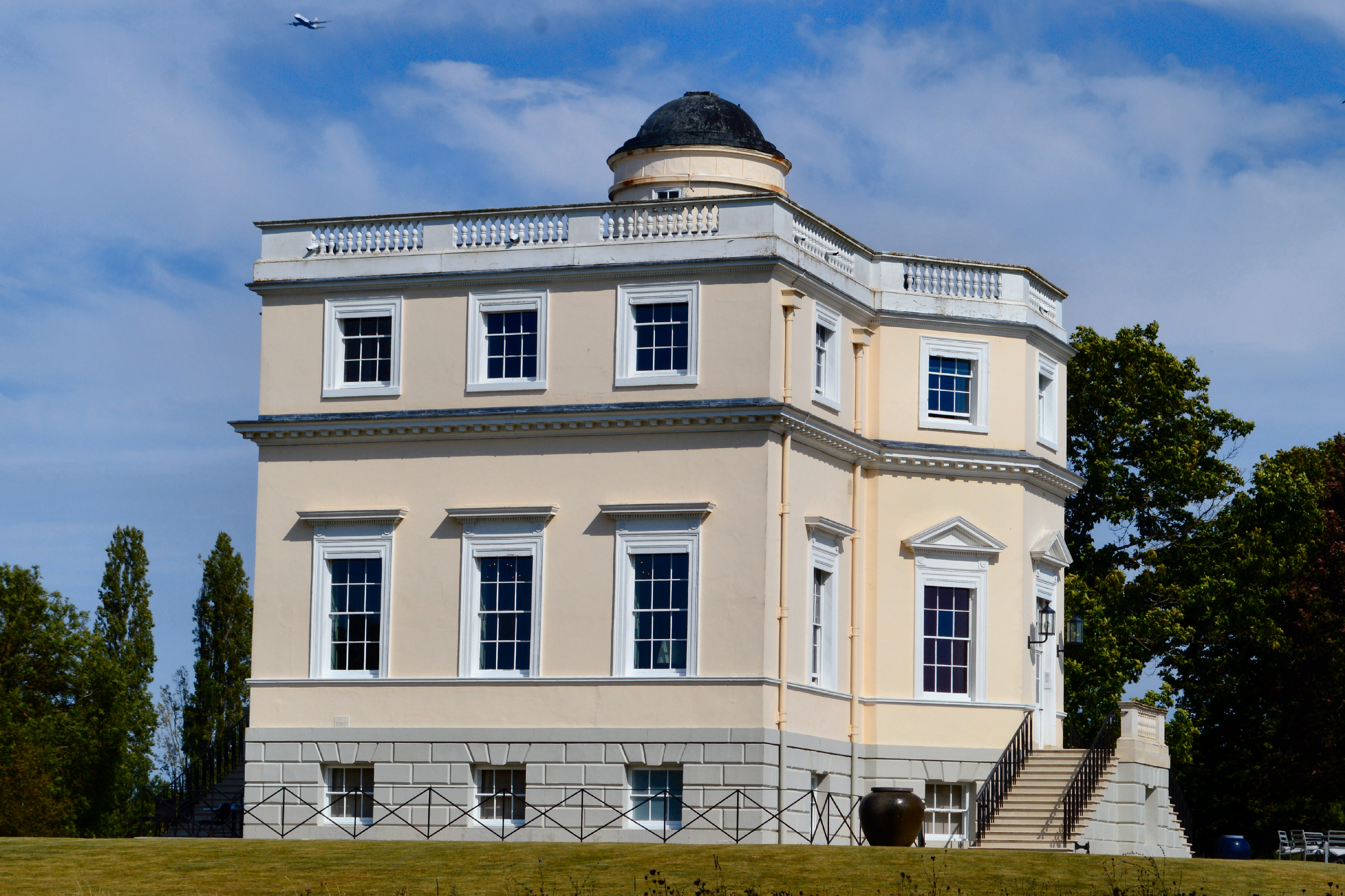
The King's Observatory

== Early life ==
She was born on 14 January 1846 in Battersea, London, the daughter of Robert Beckley (1822–1885) and Elizabeth Ann Bowler (1829–1871). Her father was employed from 1853 as a mechanical engineer based at Kew Observatory. In 1866 his salary was £100 per year. He developed the Beckley rain gauge in 1869 and in 1856 the Robinson-Beckley anemometer with Thomas Romney Robinson. About 1854 the family moved from Shoreditch to Richmond and lived at the Observatory.

== Photoheliograph at Kew Observatory ==
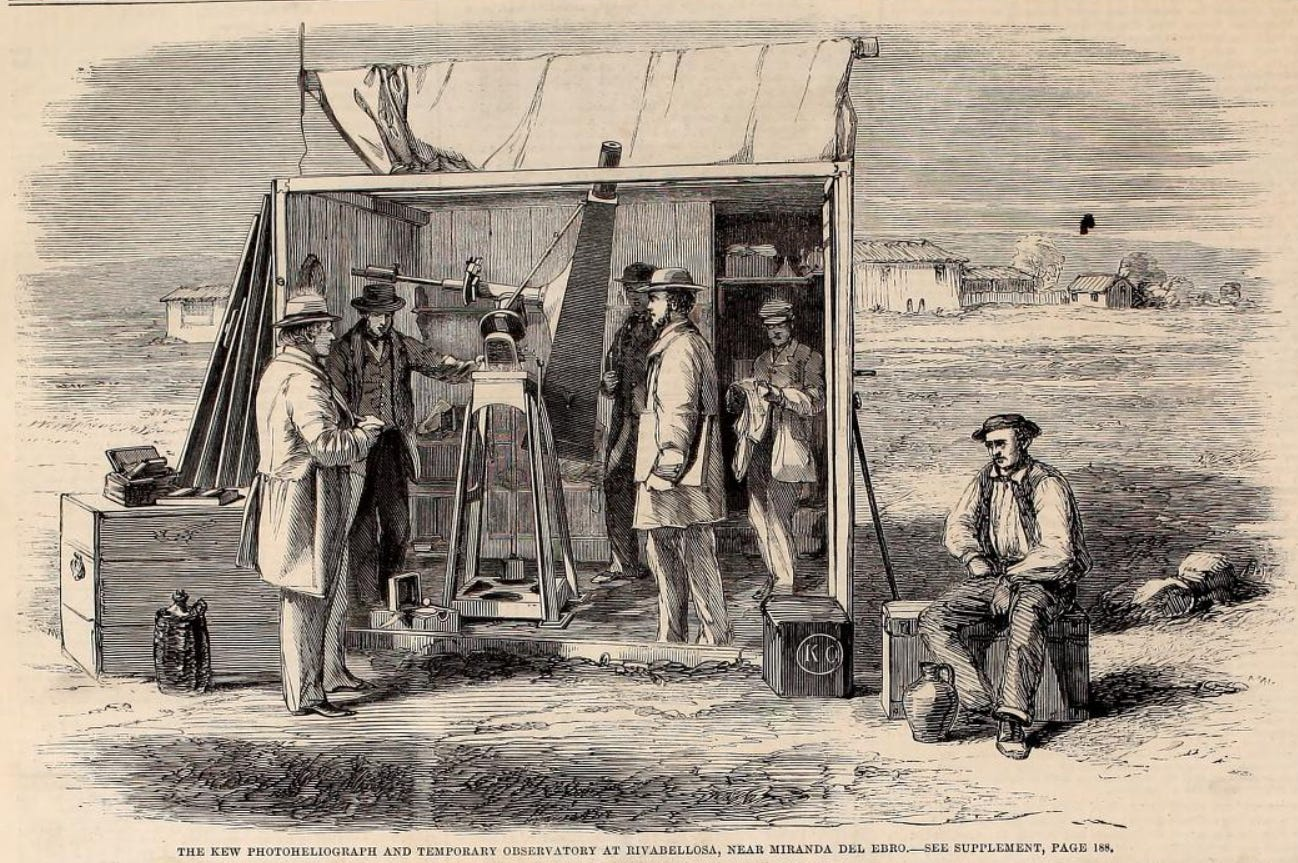
The Kew photoheliograph in Spain. Robert Beckley is second from the left.

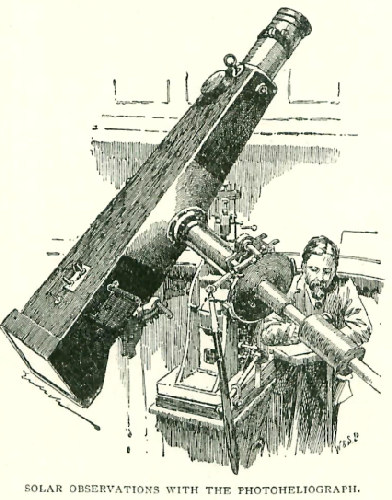
The Photoheliograph in the dome at Kew

The photoheliograph was a refracting telescope invented by Warren De la Rue which projected a magnified image of the Sun onto a photographic plate. It used the wet collodion process, which enabled shorter exposures but was very labour-intensive and needed two people to operate it. The photoheliograph became operational at Kew in 1858 but it was not until 1863 that it started to be used to take daily solar photographs because of the need for a dedicated assistant and the lack of funds. The camera was taken to Spain in 1860 for the total solar eclipse; Robert Beckley was one of the group with Mr Reynolds as an assistant. A medal was awarded to Robert Beckley for his solar pictures exhibited at the 1861 Exhibition. The camera was then operated by De la Rue in a private observatory in Cranford until it returned to Kew in 1863. De la Rue received a grant of £100 and the telescope was installed in the dome of the observatory with a photographic room built on the roof. The photographs recorded the sunspots moving across the surface of the Sun as it rotates. They helped understand the inter-relation between sunspots and magnetic cycles. The project was to photograph a ten year cycle of sunspots; it ran from 7 February 1862 to 9 April 1872. The final months in 1872 were completed at De la Rue's expense. The photoheliograph was moved to Greenwich in 1873 and is now in the Science Museum.

Year	Number of days of observations	Number of pictures obtained	Remarks
1862	163	227	At Cranford
1863	125	184	At Kew, starting May
1864	164	249	
1865	159	277	
1866	157	262	
1867	131	187	Building closed 9 August – 9 September
1868	174	285	
1869	195	324	
1870	220	381	
1871	226	381	
1872	10	21	January only

== Solar photography ==
It was probably in 1863 that Elizabeth Beckley was taken on as ‘a qualified assistant’, although she may have been assisting her father earlier since 1861. As with Mr Reynolds she does not appear in the accounts and was probably paid privately; there are records of £5 being paid to Miss Beckley piecemeal. De la Rue claimed that the photography “seems to be a work peculiarly fitting to a lady. During the day she watches for opportunities for photographing the Sun with that patience for which the sex is distinguished, and she never lets an opportunity escape her. It is extraordinary that even on very cloudy days, between gaps of cloud, when it would be imagined that it was almost impossible to get a photograph, yet there is always a record at Kew.” She appears to have been responsible for aiming the telescope and possibly in the analysis. As an assistant her work was not always noted, but by 1865 and 1870 De la Rue thanked her and recognised her contribution.

== Private life ==
Beckley married fellow Kew Observatory employee George Mathews Whipple (1842–1893) on 30 June 1870 at St John the Divine, Richmond. They had five sons. The eldest was Robert Whipple (1871–1953), who was a scientific instrument collector, and founded the Whipple Museum of the History of Science in Cambridge; he became managing director and later chairman of the Cambridge Scientific Instrument Company. Their third son, George Frederick, was an electrical and automotive engineer. Their fourth son, Francis Whipple (1876–1943), was superintendent at Kew Observatory from 1925 to 1939.

After the death of her husband Beckley left Richmond and lived in Cambridge with her son Robert and his family. She died at 15 Creighton Ave, Muswell Hill, London, on 6 August 1927. Her funeral was held in Richmond and she was buried with her husband in Richmond Old Burial Ground.

== Legacy ==
A minor planet, '(50723) Beckley = 2000 EG', was named for her in 2022.
