= Robert Whipple =

Robert Whipple may refer to:

- Robert T. Whipple (born 1946), author of books on leadership and trust
- Robert Stewart Whipple (1871–1953), businessman in the British scientific instrument trade
