= Francis John Welsh Whipple =

English mathematician, meteorologist and seismologist

- Born: March 17, 1876
- Died: September 25, 1943 (aged 67)
- Education: Trinity College, Cambridge
- Known for: Proving bicycle self-stability, superintendent of Kew Observatory
- Scientific career
- Fields: Mathematics, meteorology, seismology
- Workplaces: Meteorological Office, Kew Observatory

Francis John Welsh Whipple ScD FInstP (17 March 1876 – 25 September 1943) was an English mathematician, meteorologist and seismologist. From 1925 to 1939, he was superintendent of the Kew Observatory.

== Biography ==
Whipple was the son of Kew Observatory employees George Mathews Whipple and Elizabeth Beckley, an astronomical photographer.

Whipple attended Willington Preparatory School in Putney, where in 1888 he won a scholarship at Merchant Taylors' School. From here, he obtained a scholarship at Trinity College, Cambridge in 1895, where he was placed Second Wrangler in the Mathematical Tripos of 1897. In 1899, he showed that bicycles could be self stable.

== Career ==
From 1899–1912, he was an assistant master at Merchant Taylors' School, and then worked at the Meteorological Office in Exhibition Road, Kensington from 1912, living at Addison Road, Bedford Park. From 1925, he was Assistant-Director of the Meteorological Office and Superintendent of Kew Observatory, where he succeeded Charles Chree. Whipple remained in this post until he retired in 1939. He also served as president of the Royal Meteorological Society from 1936 to 1937.

In his role as Superintendent of Kew Observatory, Whipple played an important part in the recording of earthquakes, since Kew had been the site of a seismological observatory since 1898. During his time as superintendent, Whipple devoted considerable time and energy to improve the quality of the seismological observations. He realised that the sensitivity of the seismometers was badly affected by wind, since wind would cause the whole observatory building to move. So he designed and commissioned a new, underground bunker to hold the Kew seismometers. Whipple was Chair of the Seismological Investigations Committee of the British Association for the Advancement of Science from 1931-1939, and also served on the National Committee for Geodesy and Geophysics. These roles brought him into contact with prominent seismologists around the world. Whipple was a Fellow of the Institute of Physics, and was awarded the ScD degree from Cambridge in 1929.

== Family and connections ==
Francis Whipple had an older brother, Robert, whose collection of scientific instruments and books was the basis of the Whipple Museum of the History of Science in Cambridge. Whipple's father, George Whipple, was superintendent of Kew Observatory from 1876-1893; as was George's godfather, John Welsh, from 1852-1859.

== See also ==
- Whipple's transformation of Legendre functions
