= John Welsh (meteorologist) =

Scottish meteorologist

John Welsh FRS (1824–1859) was a Scottish meteorologist.

== Life ==
The eldest son of George Welsh of Craigenputtock, he was born at Boreland in the stewartry of Kirkcudbright on 27 September 1824. His father, who farmed, died in 1835, and his mother settled at Castle Douglas, where Welsh received an education. In November 1839, he entered the University of Edinburgh with a view to becoming a civil engineer, and studied under Philip Kelland, James David Forbes, and Robert Jameson.

In December 1842, Sir Thomas Makdougall-Brisbane - on the advice of Forbes - engaged Welsh as an observer at his observatory at Makerstoun under then director, John Allan Broun. In 1850 Welsh - who wished to move on - was recommended by Brisbane to William Henry Sykes, chairman of the committee of the British Association which managed Kew Observatory. He was then quickly appointed assistant to Francis Ronalds, who was the honorary superintendent at the time. Welsh succeeded Ronalds as superintendent on the latter's retirement in late 1853.

On 17 August, 26 August, 21 October, and 10 November 1852 Welsh made, for the Kew committee, four ascents from Vauxhall, with the assistance of Charles Green, in his balloon the Great (or Royal) Nassau. The purpose was to make meteorological observations, and a detailed description was published in Philosophical Transactions in 1853. In March and May 1854 he made for the committee an investigation on the "pumping" of marine barometers, an artefact of the rolling motion of ships. In 1855 Welsh went to the Exposition Universelle in Paris for the exhibit of magnetic and meteorological instruments used at Kew. In 1856 he began at Kew a series of monthly determinations of magnetic field intensity and magnetic dip with instruments provided by Edward Sabine. In the same year Welsh was directed to construct self-recording magnetic instruments on models devised originally by Ronalds and improved by himself.

In 1857 Welsh was elected Fellow of the Royal Society. For the Kew committee's magnetic survey of the British Isles, Welsh was appointed to undertake the "North British" division, and spent part of the summers of 1857 and 1858 on this work. But during the winter of 1857–8 he suffered from lung disease, and this became more serious during the following year. Acting under medical advice, he spent the winter of 1858–9, accompanied by his mother, at Falmouth, and died there on 11 May 1859.

== Works ==
At the Ipswich meeting of the British Association in October 1851, Welsh read a long report on Francis Ronalds's three magnetographs. He also presented and described two slide-rules for reducing hygrometrical and magnetic observations. In 1852 he read a report on the methods used in graduating and comparing standard instruments at Kew Observatory.

== Kew Connections ==
John Welsh was godfather to G.M. Whipple (1842-1893), who was later superintendent of the Kew Observatory from 1876-1893. G.M.Whipple's son, Francis Whipple was also superintendent of Kew, from 1925-1939.

== Notes ==
Attribution

This article incorporates text from a publication now in the public domain: Lee, Sidney, ed. (1899). "Welsh, John". Dictionary of National Biography. Vol. 60. London: Smith, Elder & Co.
