= James Stephen Rigaud =

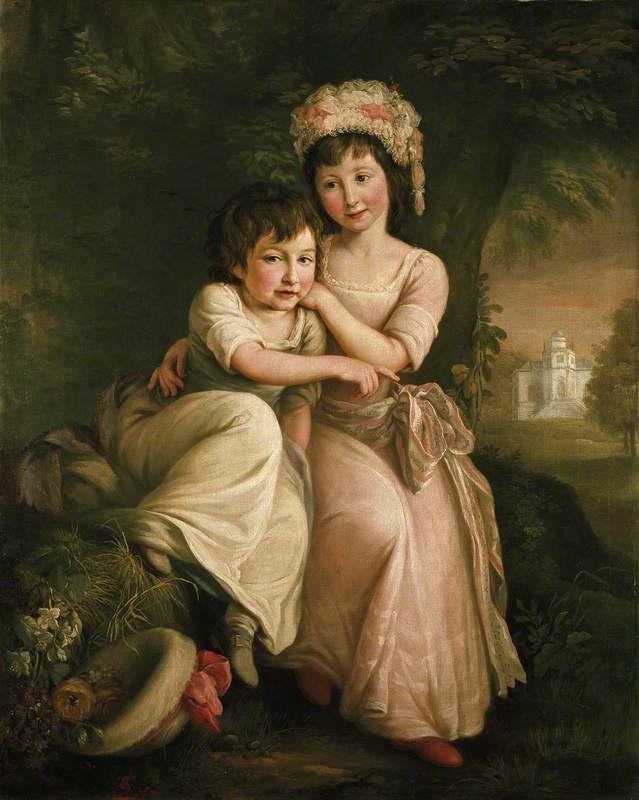
Mary Anne and Stephen Peter Rigaud by John Francis Rigaud, 1778 (Ashmolean Museum).

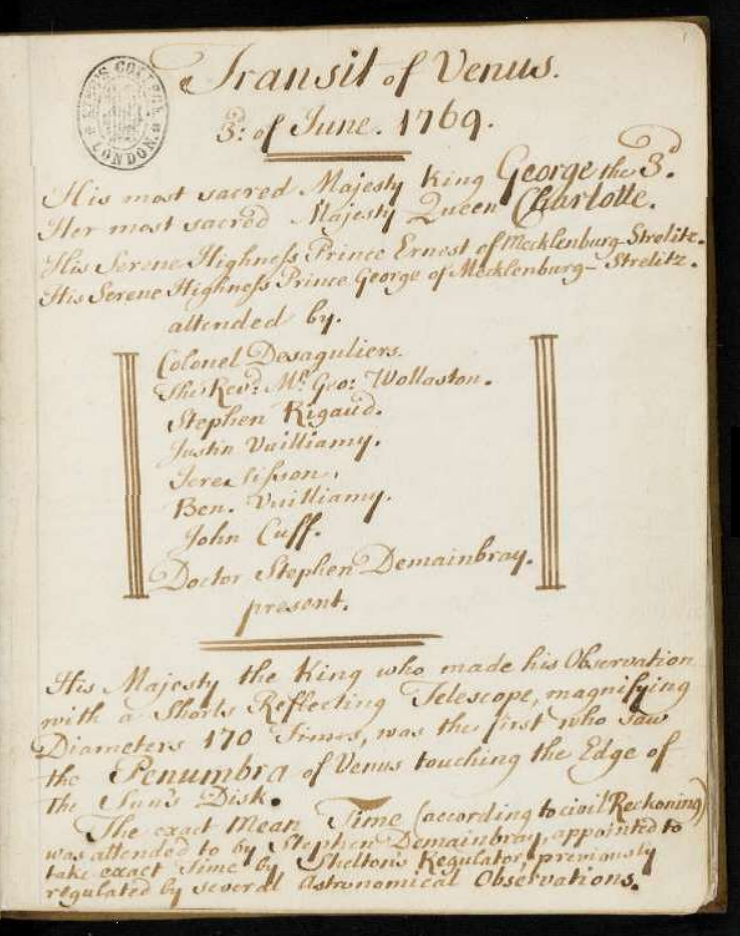
Extract from Observations on the Transit of Venus, a manuscript notebook from the collections of George III, showing Rigaud at the royal observations of the 1769 Transit of Venus.

James Stephen Rigaud (1726 – 16 April 1814), also known as Stephen Rigaud, was an astronomer of the 18th century.

== Life ==
His parents were Pierre Rigaud and Anne Unice Mestre.

Stephen Rigaud became Assistant Observer to Dr Stephen Demainbray at the King's Observatory, built near Richmond Lodge for the 1769 Transit of Venus. In 1771 he married Deminbray's daughter Mary at St Mary Magdalene's Church, Richmond. going on to live at 5 Old Palace Terrace in the town. They had two children, Mary Anne and Stephen Peter Rigaud, later an astronomer and mathematical historian. Mary Anne and Stephen Peter were painted by John Francis Rigaud in 1778 – they are posed in a park landscape with Kew Observatory in the background and although the painting is sometimes described as showing Richmond Park the topography makes it more likely that it shows the Old Deer Park, which surrounds the Observatory. Rigaud died in 1814 and is buried in the Vineyard Passage Burial Ground near the church where he had married.
