= Albert George Dew-Smith =

British physiologist, photographer and entrepreneur (1848–1903)

- Born: Albert George Dew; October 27, 1848; Salisbury, England
- Died: March 17, 1903 (aged 54); Fulham, London
- Education: Trinity College, Cambridge
- Known for: electrical stimulation of muscles; photography; scientific equipment manufacture
- Spouse: Alice Lloyd

Albert George Dew-Smith (27 October 1848 – 17 March 1903) was a British physiologist, lens maker, bibliophile, and amateur photographer. He co-founded the Cambridge Scientific Instrument Company, and conducted early research with physiologist Michael Foster.

== Personal life and education ==
A. G. Dew-Smith was born in Salisbury, England to Charles Dew. He took the name Dew-Smith after inheriting substantial property in 1870. (Note: According to Walford's County Families, Dew assumed the name of Smith by royal license in 1870 under the will of the late William Smith, Esq., a banker of Salisbury.) After being a pupil at Harrow School, he attended Trinity College, Cambridge, earning a B.A. (1873) and M.A. (1876) in Natural Sciences. He was an early student of Michael Foster, and conducted research on electrical stimulation of mollusc and frog hearts in the 1870s, making three working visits to the Naples Zoological Station. He enjoyed Italy and returned for visits later in his life.

In 1895 he married Alice Lloyd, a New Zealand-born author; they had no children. They lived at Chesterton Hall on Chesterton Road, Cambridge. He died at Fulham, London, and is buried in Histon Road Cemetery, Cambridge.

== Career ==
A man of independent wealth, he financed the founding of The Journal of Physiology, of which Foster was the first editor. He was also a founding member of The Physiological Society. By around 1876-78 Dew-Smith had left scientific research, although he maintained an interest in producing laboratory equipment as well as contact with scientists at Cambridge. He had his own workshop and ground high-quality microscope lenses. Dew-Smith later launched the Cambridge Engraving Company, and in 1881 established the Cambridge Scientific Instrument Company with Horace Darwin.

He became a noted photographer, particularly of portraits and scientific equipment. In 1884 he was elected a member of the Photographic Society of Great Britain and showed prints at the 1885 exhibition. He was also a fellow and life member of the Cambridge Philosophical Society.

He gave up every day involvement in commercial activities after his marriage. He continued with some photography and lithography for personal pleasure. This included facsimile productions of old books and manuscripts. Dew-Smith was a significant collector of art, literature and gems. His collecting had started when he inherited wealth in 1870. He owned many first editions and hand written manuscripts by authors such as William Blake, Lord Byron and Percy Bysshe Shelley. He was a member of the Savile and Rabelais clubs in the 1880s and also the Society of Dilettanti in 1878.

Select photographs by A. G. Dew-Smith

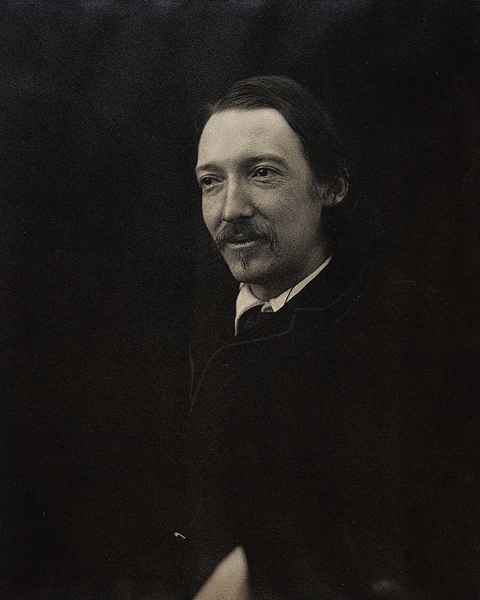
Robert Louis Stevenson, writer, 1885

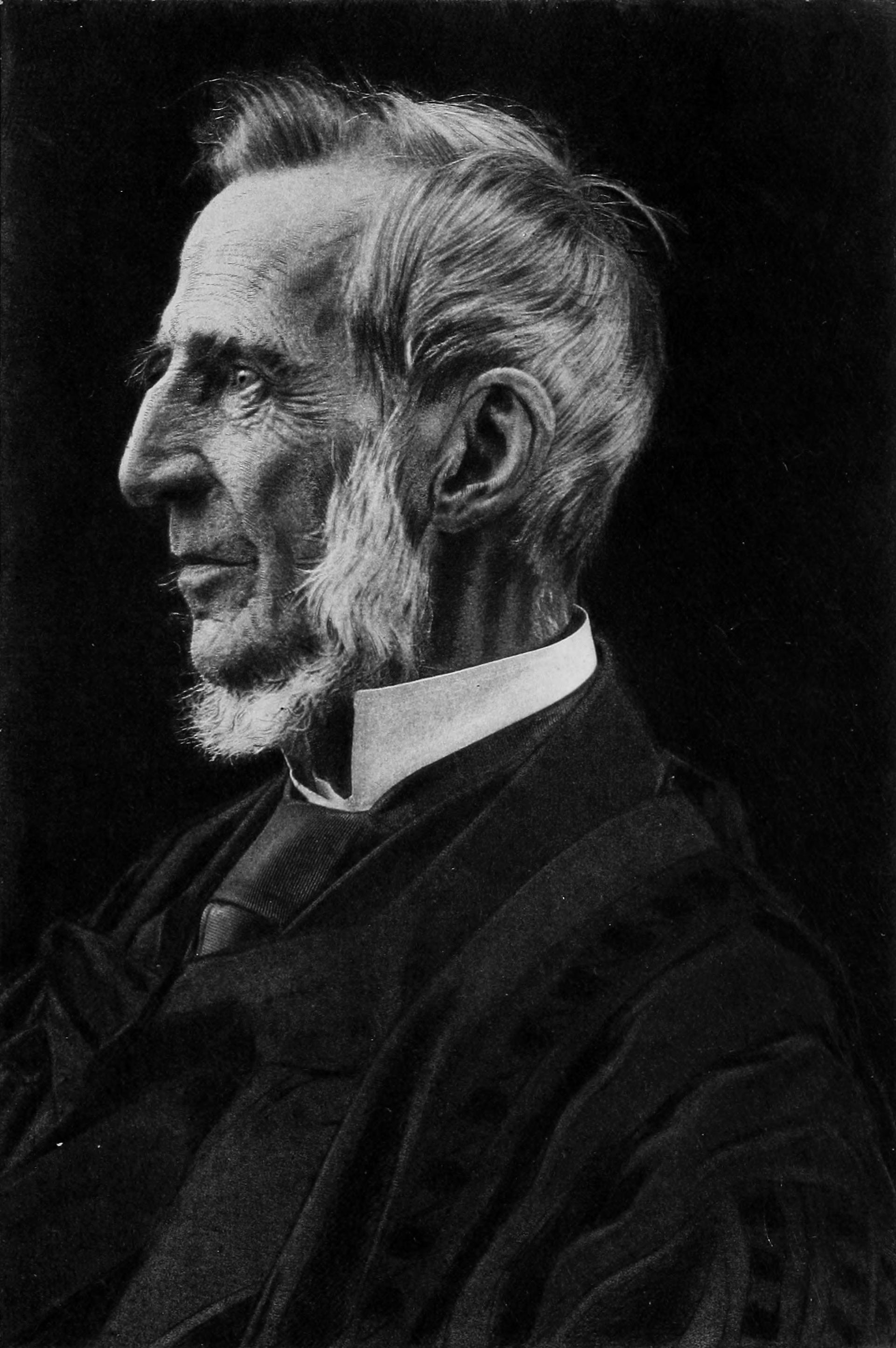
Sir George Edward Paget, MD

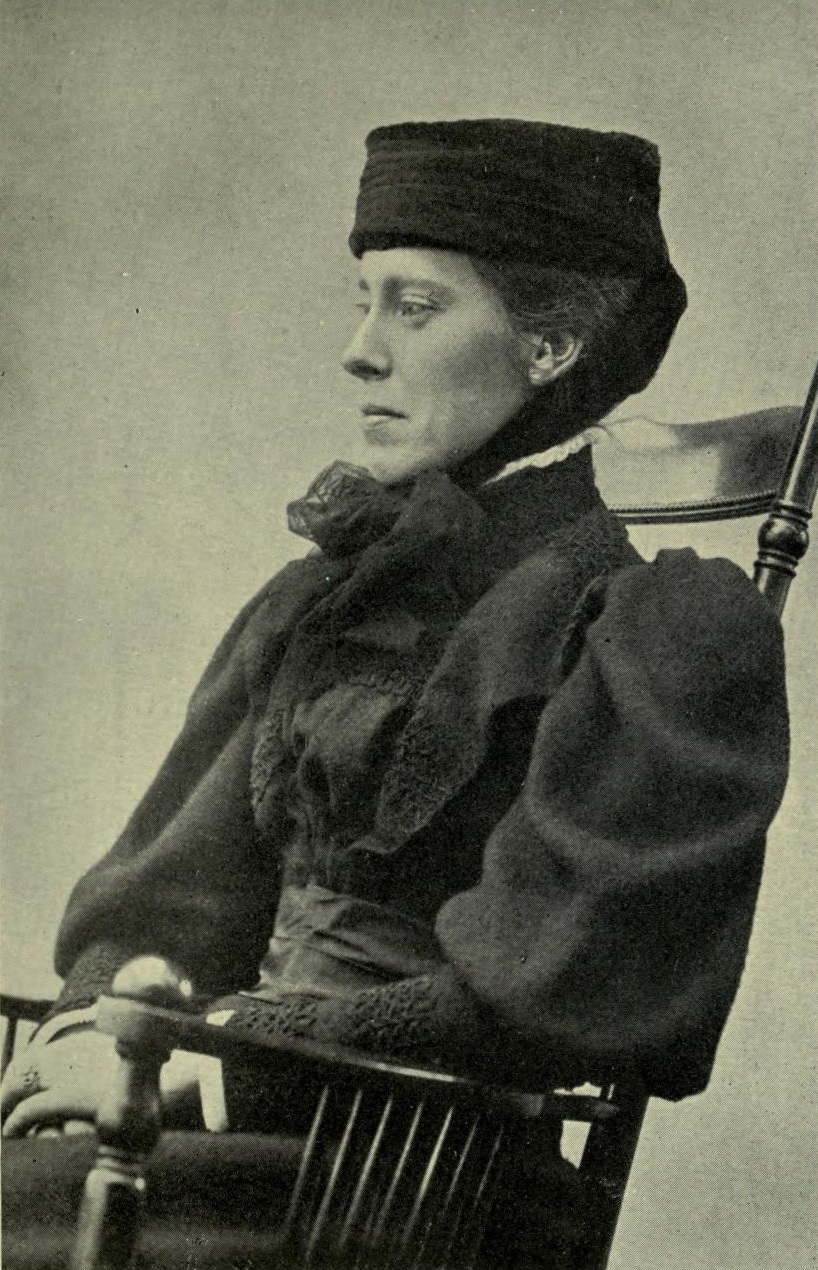
Mary Kingsley, writer and explorer
