= George Mathews Whipple =

English physicist, superintendent of the Kew Observatory (1842–1893)

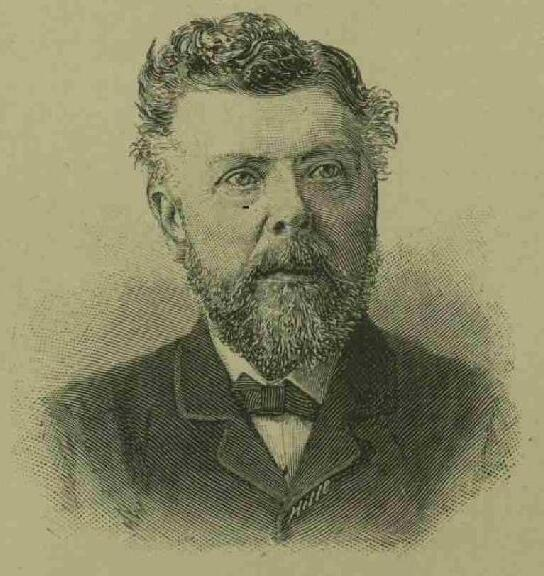
- Born: 15 September 1842; Teddington
- Died: 8 February 1893; Richmond
- Occupation: Physicist
- Children: Robert Stewart Whipple

George Mathews Whipple (15 September 1842 – 8 February 1893), was a British physicist who was superintendent of the Kew Observatory.

== Early life ==
He was born at Teddington where both his father, George Whipple, and mother were teachers. He attended Kingston Grammar School, a private school run by Dr Williams in Richmond and King's College London, where he obtained his BSc in 1871.

== Career ==
He joined the staff at the Kew Observatory in 1858, became magnetic assistant in 1862, chief assistant in 1863, and superintendent in 1876. He was responsible for the testing of magnetographs before being distributed abroad. The Observatory also tested barometers, thermometers, anemometers, telescopes, chronometers, watches, photographic lenses, etc.

He prepared the magnetic section of the report on the 1883 Krakatoa eruption. He carried out pendulum experiments for determining the constant of gravitation with Captain William James Heaviside of the Indian Survey in 1873, with Colonel John Herschel of the Royal Engineers in 1881, and with General James Thomas Walker in 1888.

Whipple was a Fellow of the Royal Astronomical Society, Royal Meteorological Society and the Physical Society. He would give talks on various subjects, such as "the weather, how can it be fortold".

== Personal life ==
He married Elizabeth Beckley (1846–1927), a pioneering British astronomical photographer who worked at the Observatory, at St John's Church, Richmond, in 1870. In 1871 they were living at 2 Old Deer Park Cottages. They had five sons. The eldest was Robert Whipple, who was a scientific instrument collector, and founded the Whipple Museum of the History of Science in Cambridge. Their third son, George Frederick, was an electrical and automotive engineer. Their fourth son was Francis Whipple who was superintendent at Kew Observatory from 1925 to 1939.

Whipple died at Oak Villa, 9, Jocelyn Road, Richmond, on 8 February 1893 and was buried in Richmond Old Burial Ground.
