= Robert Stewart Whipple =

Robert Stewart Whipple (1 August 1871 – 13 December 1953) was a businessman in the British scientific instrument trade, a collector of science books and scientific instruments, and an author on their history. He amassed a unique collection of antique scientific instruments that he later donated to found the Whipple Museum of the History of Science in Cambridge in 1944.

== Life ==
Robert Whipple's father, George Mathews Whipple, was superintendent of the Royal Observatory at Kew, where his mother Elizabeth Beckley also worked. After attending King's College School, Whipple began his career at the Kew Observatory as an assistant, before leaving to become assistant manager at instrument making firm L. P. Casella. Whipple moved to Cambridge in 1898 to take up the post of personal assistant to Horace Darwin, the founder of the Cambridge Scientific Instrument Company. He spent the rest of his career there, rising to become Managing Director of the firm and later its Chairman.

Whipple was a Founder-Fellow of the Institute of Physics, a Fellow of the Physical Society, where he served as Vice-President and Honorary Treasurer, and President of the British Optical Instrument Manufacturers' Association. He began collecting antique scientific instruments in 1913, eventually donating about a thousand instruments and a thousand antiquarian science books to the University of Cambridge in 1944. The collection formed the basis for the University's Whipple Museum of the History of Science, and has been displayed publicly on the same site since 1959. Whipple was keen that both the Museum and the Whipple Library play an active role in the teaching of history and philosophy of science, and both have remained at the centre of the Department of History and Philosophy of Science, University of Cambridge.

Robert Whipple had a younger brother, Francis, a meteorologist who, like his father, served as Superintendent of Kew Observatory.

== Publications ==
- Robert S Whipple (1930) Some scientific instrument makers of the eighteenth century. J. Sci. Instrum. 7 241–253
