= Vineyard Passage Burial Ground =

Cemetery in Richmond upon Thames, London

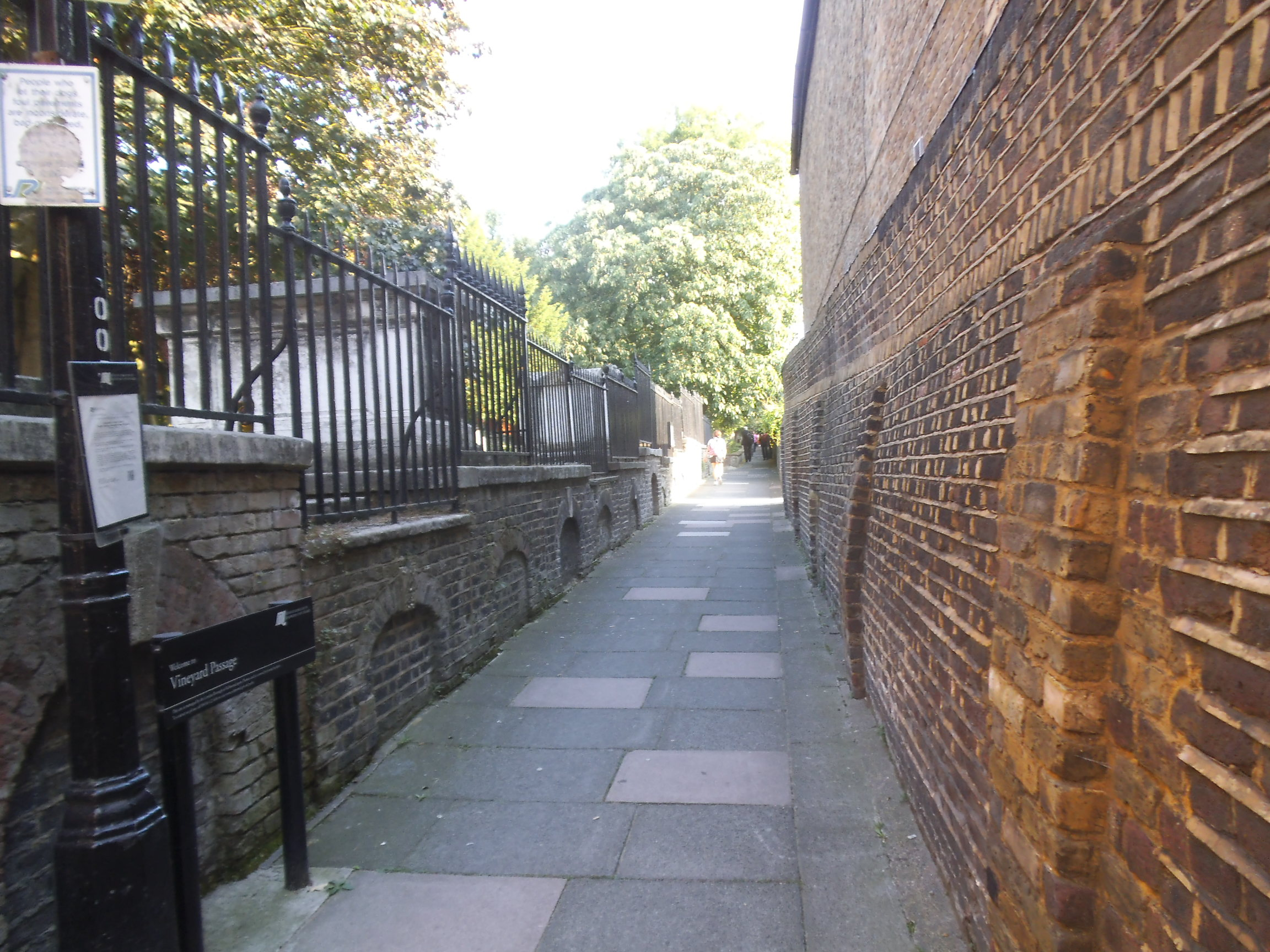
- Vineyard Passage: the burial ground is on the left
- Interactive map of Vineyard Passage Burial Ground

Details
- Established: 1790
- Closed: 1874
- Location: Grosvenor Road, Richmond, TW10 6PB (London Borough of Richmond upon Thames)
- Country: England
- Coordinates: 51°27′33″N 0°18′05″W
- Owned by: Richmond upon Thames Council
- Website: Vineyard Passage Cemetery

Vineyard Passage Burial Ground is a cemetery on Vineyard Passage in Richmond in the London Borough of Richmond upon Thames. Established in 1790 and consecrated in 1791, it was enlarged in 1823. The last burials were in 1874. Managed by Richmond upon Thames Council and maintained by volunteers from the Environment Trust for Richmond upon Thames, it is now a garden of rest.

== Notable burials ==
- Thomas Cundy (senior) (1765–1825), English architect and his wife Mary (née Hubert). The monument to them is Grade II listed.
- Jacques Mallet du Pan (1749–1800), French historian and journalist. He took up the Royalist cause during the French Revolution.
- John Moore (1729–1802), a Scottish physician and travel author who also edited the works of Tobias Smollett.
- James Stephen Rigaud, English astronomer (b.1726)

== Listing ==
The brick walls to the cemetery (forming the side of Vineyard Passage) and the 19th-century iron railings are Grade II listed.

== Gallery ==
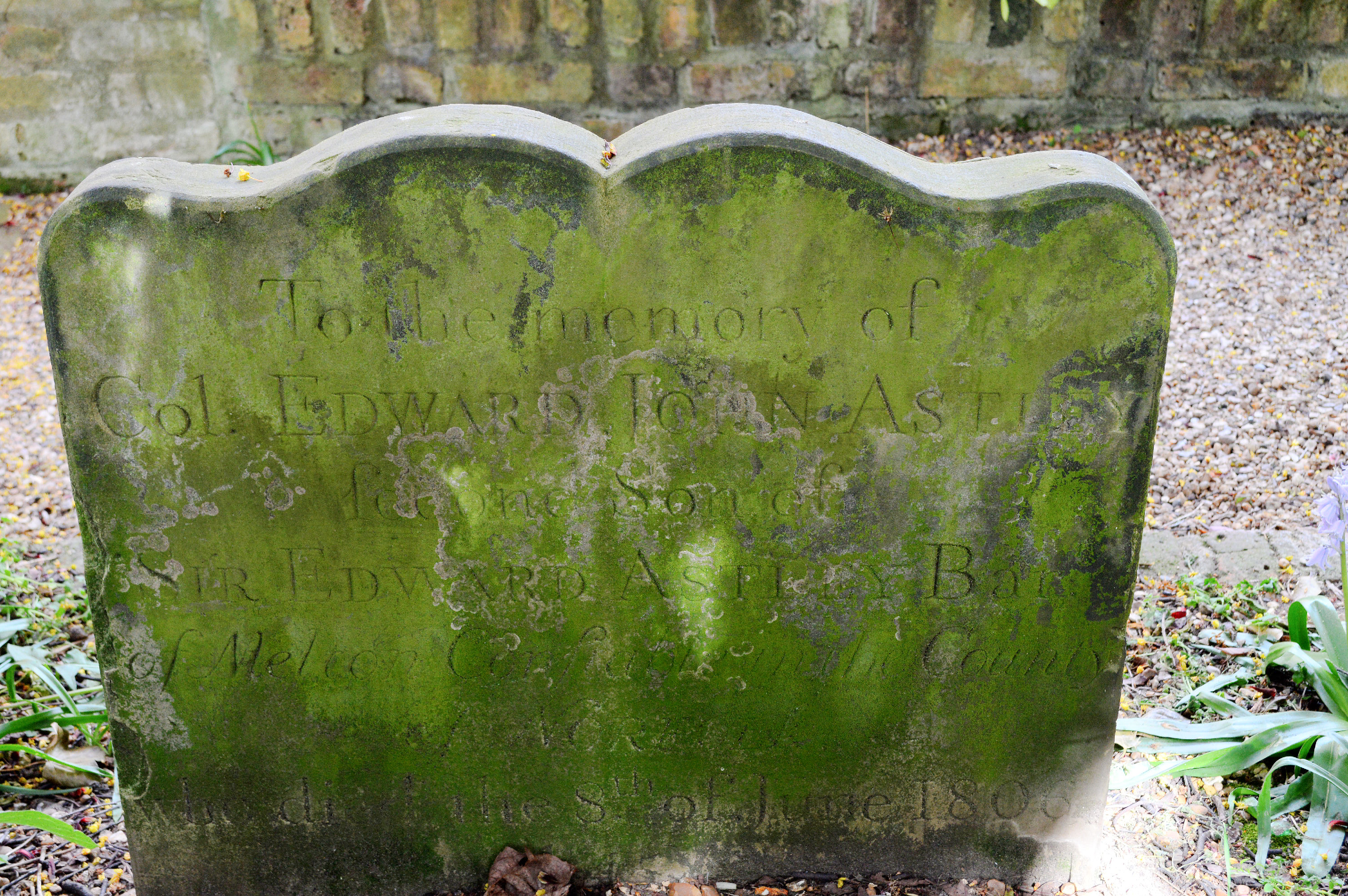
Grave of Col. Edward John Astley

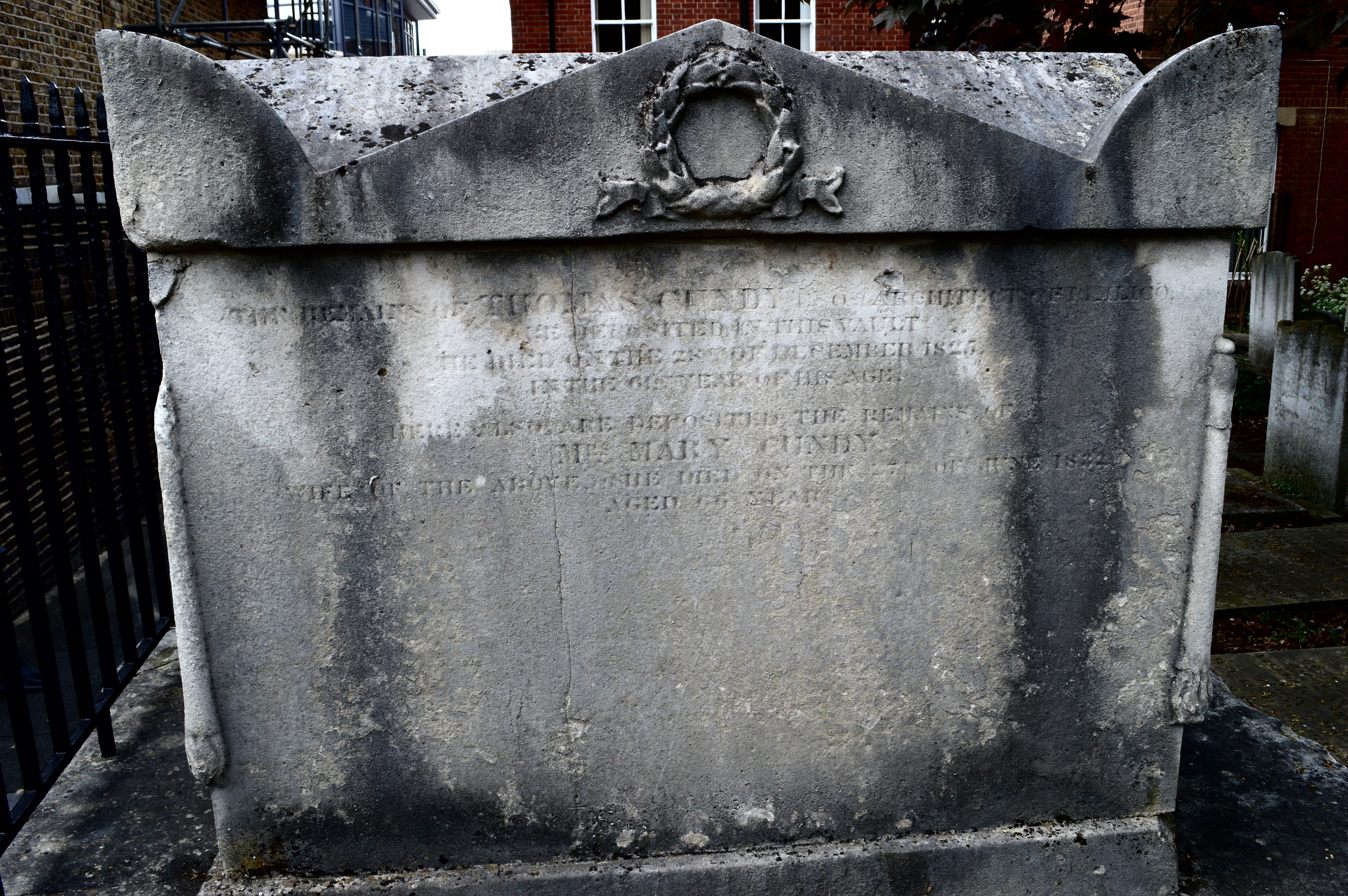
The Grade II listed grave of architect Thomas Cundy and his wide Mary

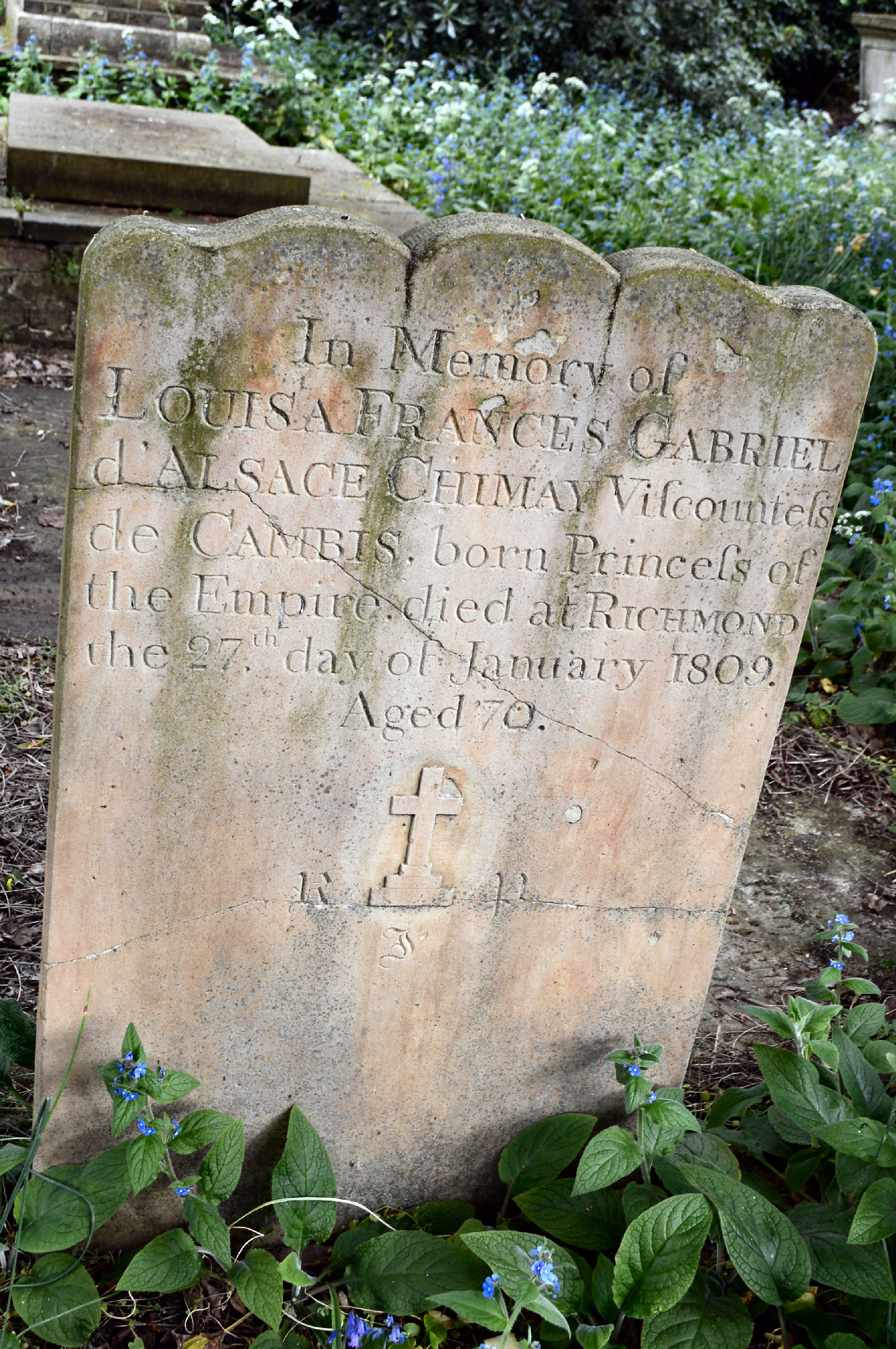
Grave of Louisa Frances Gabriel d'Alsace Chimay, Viscountess de Cambis

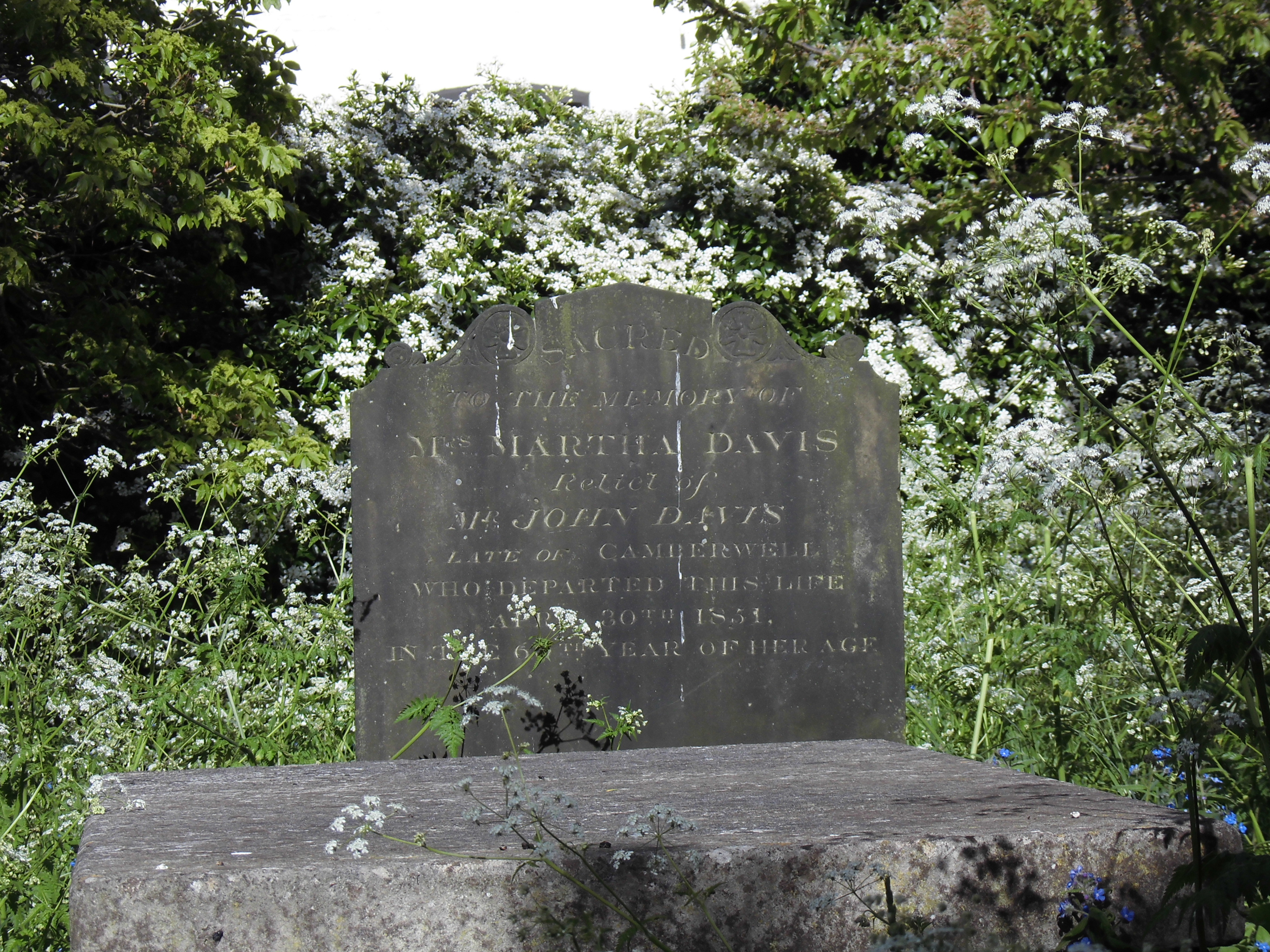
Grave of Martha Davis

== See also ==
- The Vineyard, Richmond
