= Stephen Demainbray =

English natural scientist and astronomer

Stephen Charles Triboudet Demainbray (1710 – 20 February 1782) was an English natural scientist and astronomer, who was Superintendent (or King's Astronomer) at the King's Observatory in Richmond, Surrey (now in London) from 1768 to 1782.

== Early life and education ==
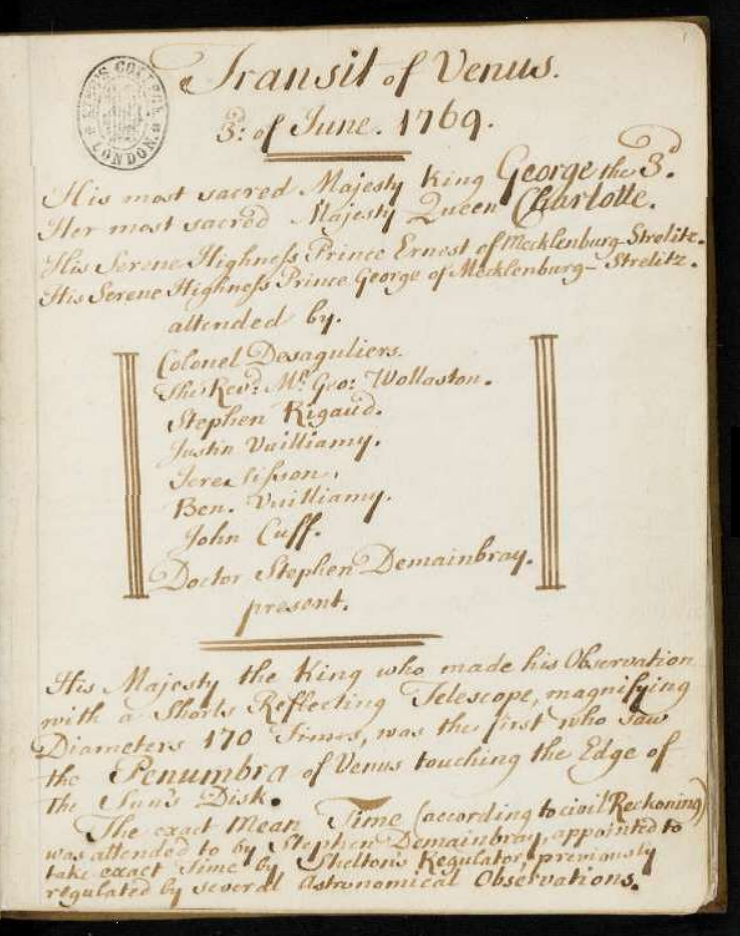
Extract from Observations on the Transit of Venus, a manuscript notebook from the collections of George III, showing Demainbray's presence at the transit observations at Richmond in 1769

Demainbray was born in the parish of St Martins, London in 1710. His parents, (Charles) Stephen Demainbray (d.c. 1710) and Mary, daughter of Rev Alexander Descairac, were married on 21 September 1699 at St Mary Magdalen Old Fish Street, London. His father, who had come to England from France following the revocation of the Edict of Nantes, died soon afterwards and he was brought up by his uncle, Captain Peter Demainbray (d. 1733) who placed him at Westminster School. There he studied under Dr Desaguliers, who taught him mathematics and natural philosophy. After that he went to Leiden University in the Netherlands.

== Career ==
From 1740 to 1742, Demainbray lectured in experimental philosophy in Edinburgh. The 1745 Jacobite Rising brought him to take arms for the government for four years, and he was a volunteer at the Battle of Prestonpans.

In 1746, he resumed his lectures, and worked on the influence of electricity on vegetables. Three years later, he began travelling throughout Britain and Europe, lecturing in Dublin and Paris. In 1753, he was invited to London by the Prince of Wales, later George III, and the Duke of York. He returned to England in 1755 and read a public course of lectures in the concert-room in Panton Street, and later gave private courses to members of the royal family, including the future King George III.

In 1768, he was appointed Superintendent of the King's Observatory (or King's Astronomer) in Richmond, which King George III had commissioned from Sir William Chambers. He arranged for George III to see the Transit of Venus on 3 June 1769. He held that appointment until his death on 20 February 1782. His assistant there was James Stephen Rigaud, who married Demainbray's daughter Mary in Richmond in 1771.

== Personal life ==
In London on 22 February 1726, in a clandestine marriage, Demainbray married his first wife, Mary Worsham (d. 1755 Montpellier, France) and they had five children. Only their daughter Mary survived to adulthood; she married James Stephen Rigaud.

In 1755 he married, at St Anne's Church, Soho, his second wife, Sarah Horne (a sister of John Horne Tooke), and fathered a further four children including Stephen George Francis Triboudet Demainbray.

== Legacy ==
Demainbray's instruments were combined with the King's collection and given to King's College London and then, in 1927, to the Science Museum.
