= Museum of Classical Archaeology, Cambridge =

Museum of Classical Archaeology
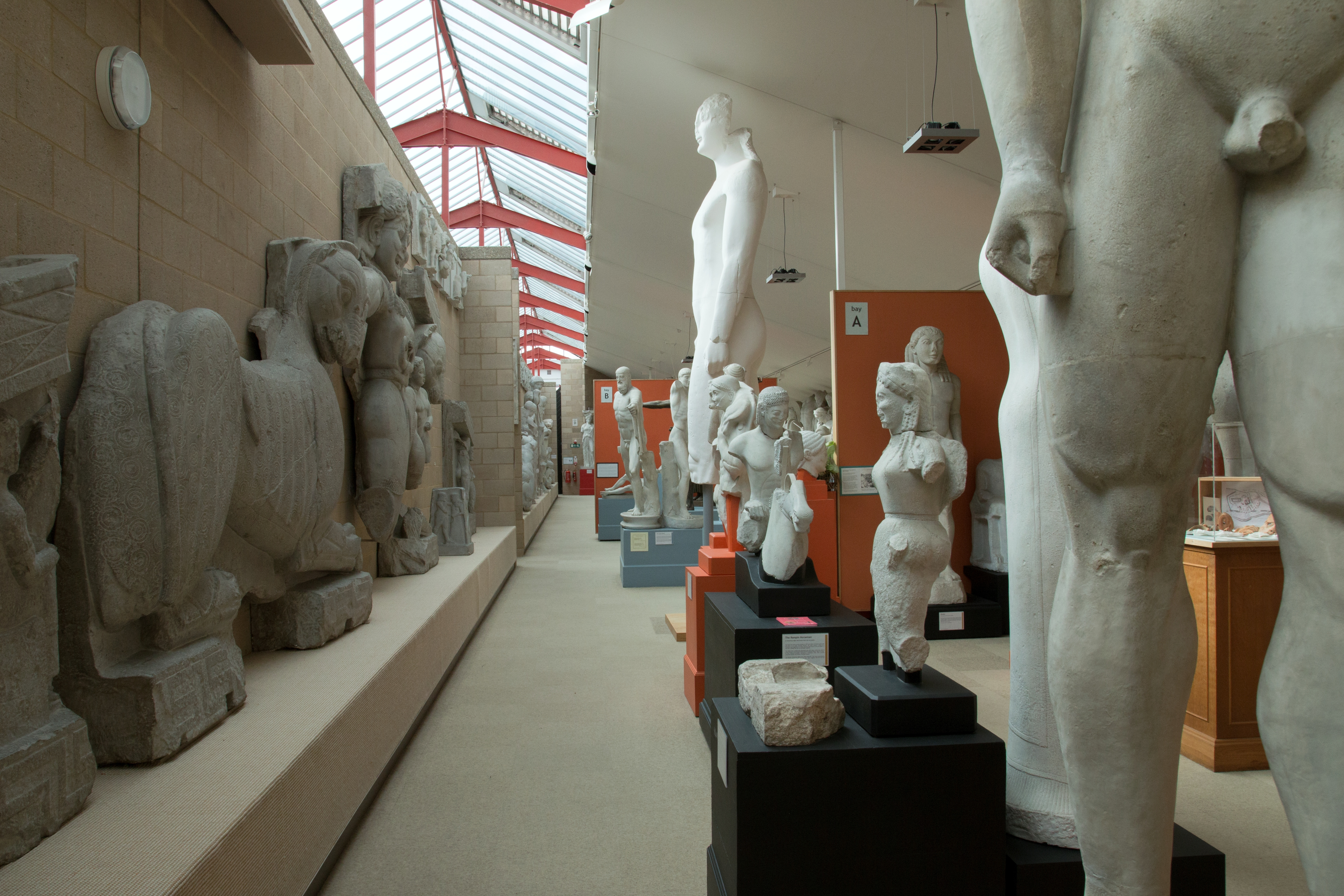
- Museum of Classical Archaeology
- Location: Cambridge
- Coordinates: 52.200632°N 0.110280°E
- Type: University museum
- Collections: Plaster casts of ancient Greek and Roman sculpture; sherds; epigraphic squeezes
- Visitors: 8,132 (2022)
- Director: Professor Caroline Vout
- Curator: Dr Susanne Turner
- Owner: University of Cambridge

University of Cambridge Museums
- Fitzwilliam Museum; Kettle's Yard; Museum of Archaeology and Anthropology; Museum of Classical Archaeology; Whipple Museum of the History of Science; Sedgwick Museum of Earth Sciences; The Polar Museum; Museum of Zoology

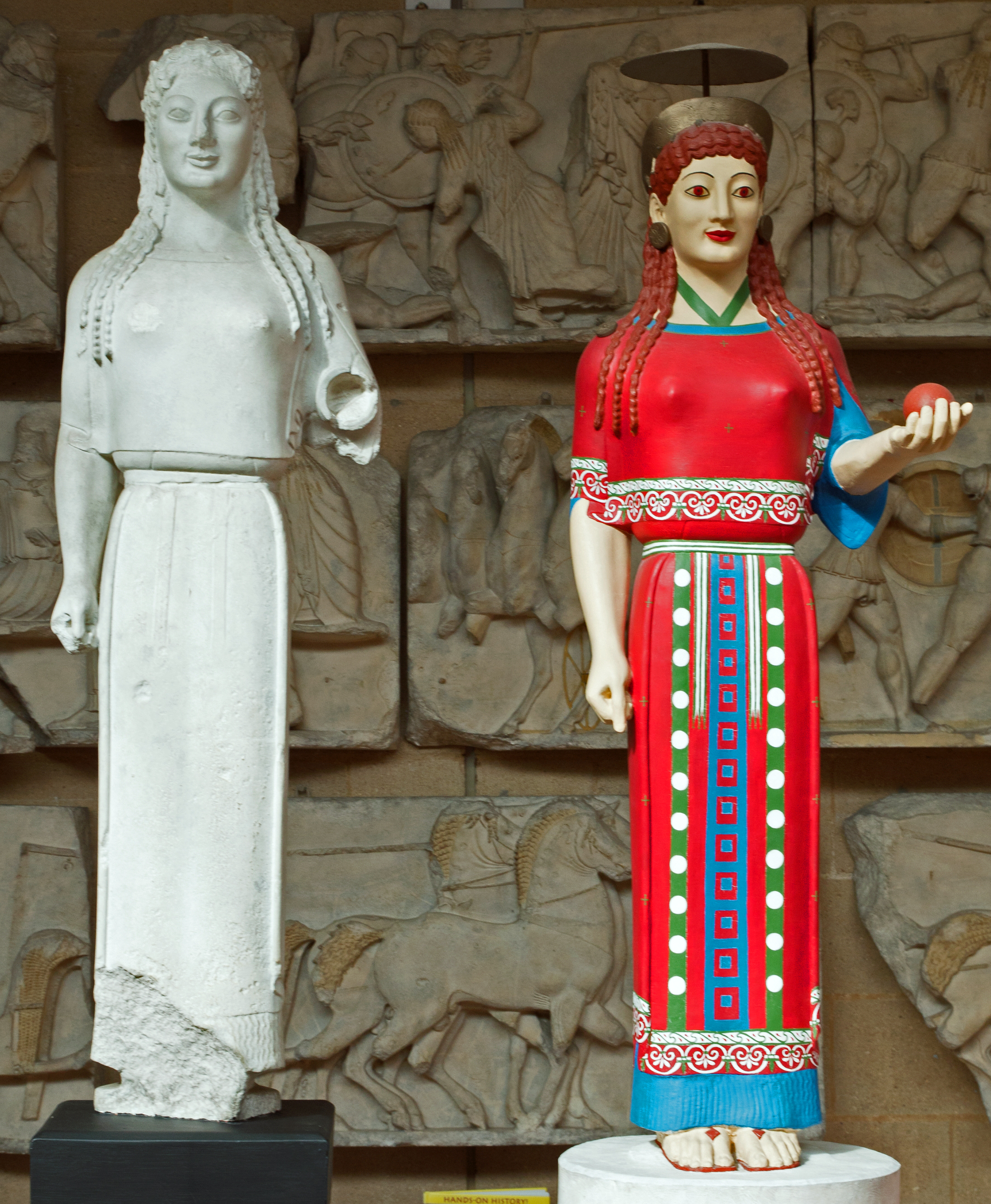
Peplos Kore, cast and reconstruction, in the Museum of Classical Archaeology

The Museum of Classical Archaeology is a museum in Cambridge, England. Founded in 1884, the museum is housed in the Faculty of Classics of the University of Cambridge. Since 1982, it has been located in a purpose-built gallery on the first floor of the Faculty of Classics on the Sidgwick Site of the university.

The Museum of Classical Archaeology is one of eight which make up the University of Cambridge Museums consortium. The museum is open to the public Tuesday to Friday (10.00am to 5.00pm) and on Saturdays in university term time (2.00pm to 5.00pm).

== Collection ==
The museum is one of the few surviving collections of plaster casts of ancient Greek and Roman sculpture in the world. The collection consists of several hundred casts, including casts of some of the most famous surviving ancient Greek and Roman sculptures. Noteworthy casts include those of the Laocoön and His Sons, the Farnese Hercules, the Barberini Faun and the Charioteer of Delphi.

The Peplos Kore is perhaps the best known exhibit in the museum. It is a plaster cast of an ancient Greek statue of a young woman painted brightly as the original would have been, which was set up on the Acropolis of Athens, around 530 BCE. In 1975, the museum attempted to replicate the sculpture's original appearance by painting a cast of the figure. The replica is displayed next to a second, unpainted cast as a challenge to the erroneous equation of ancient Greek sculpture with pure white marble.

The museum also holds a large collection of sherds and epigraphic squeezes.

== Exhibitions ==
The museum frequently hosts exhibitions bringing contemporary art, academic research, and archival materials into direct dialogue with the plaster casts of classical sculpture.

This can involve bringing objects from store that aren't normally on show, or inviting contemporary artists to show their work in the gallery.

The current exhibition (17 Feb 2026 - 17 Oct 2026), Poiesis, brings works from the Oxford-based artist Tom de Freston into the museum. These works were originally shown in an exhibition at Varvara Roza Gallery, and depict his wife Kiran Millwood Hargrave through a period of difficult pregnancies and miscarriages, while playing on a classical style of depicting figures most notably inspired by the Italian Renaissance painter Titian. He also wrote of this period in their life, and how he explored his experience of losses through his artwork in his book Strange Bodies.

== Former building ==
Its former home on Little St Mary's Lane was designed by Basil Champneys in 1883. In the 1970s it became evident that it was no longer adequate to house the collection and the 100-year lease from Peterhouse was coming to an end. The former museum building now houses the Ward Library of Peterhouse.
