= University of Cambridge Museums =

Consortium of museums of the University of Cambridge

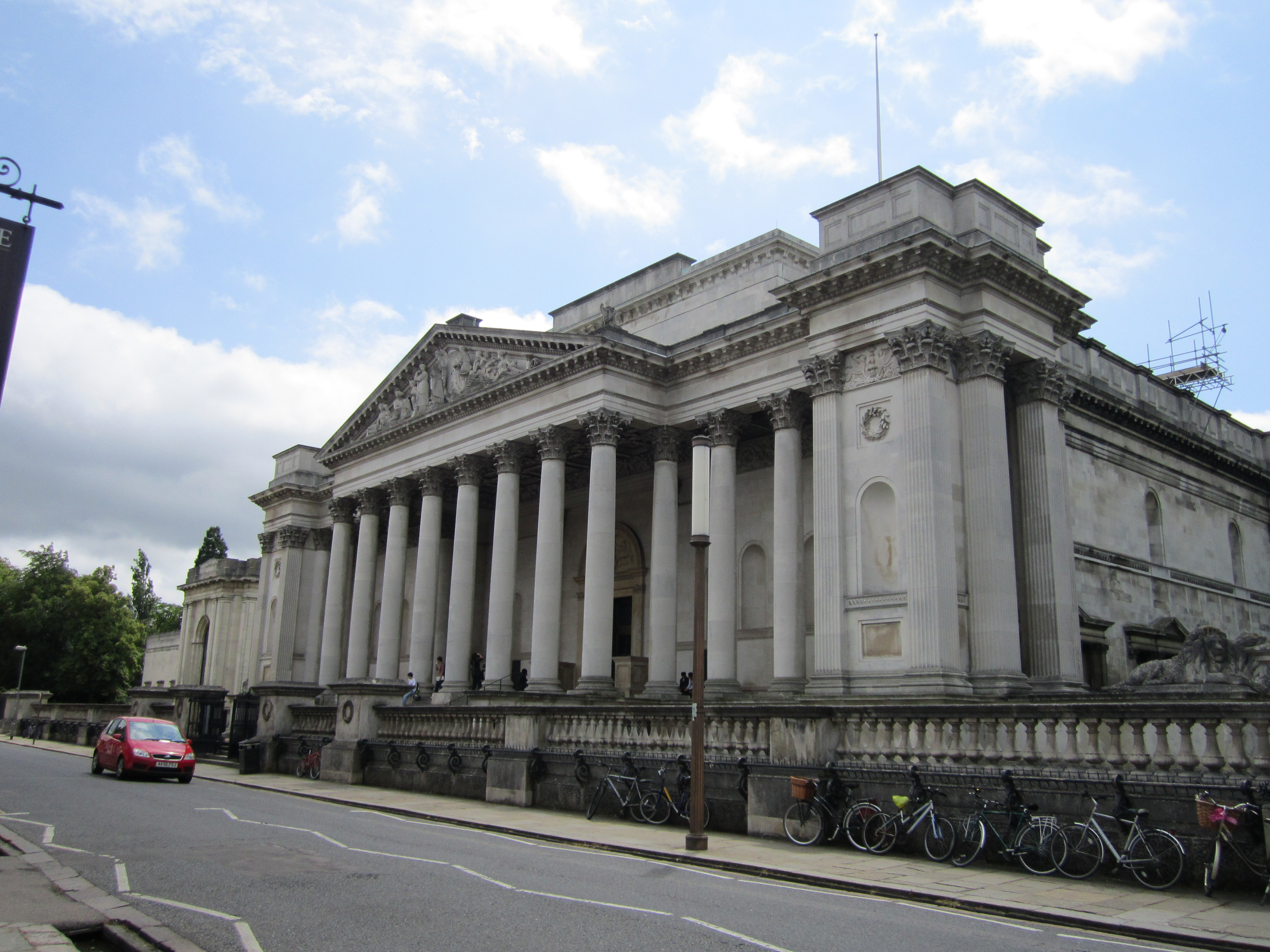
Fitzwilliam Museum, one of the eight members of the University of Cambridge Museums consortium

University of Cambridge Museums is a consortium of the eight museums of the University of Cambridge.

The consortium works in partnership with the Cambridge University Botanic Garden and other Cambridge University collections. It was awarded Major partner museum status by Arts Council England in 2012.

The consortium comprises:

- Fitzwilliam Museum
- Museum of Archaeology and Anthropology
- The Polar Museum
- Sedgwick Museum of Earth Sciences
- Museum of Classical Archaeology
- Whipple Museum of the History of Science
- Kettle's Yard
- University Museum of Zoology
