= Willington School =

Willington Independent Preparatory School
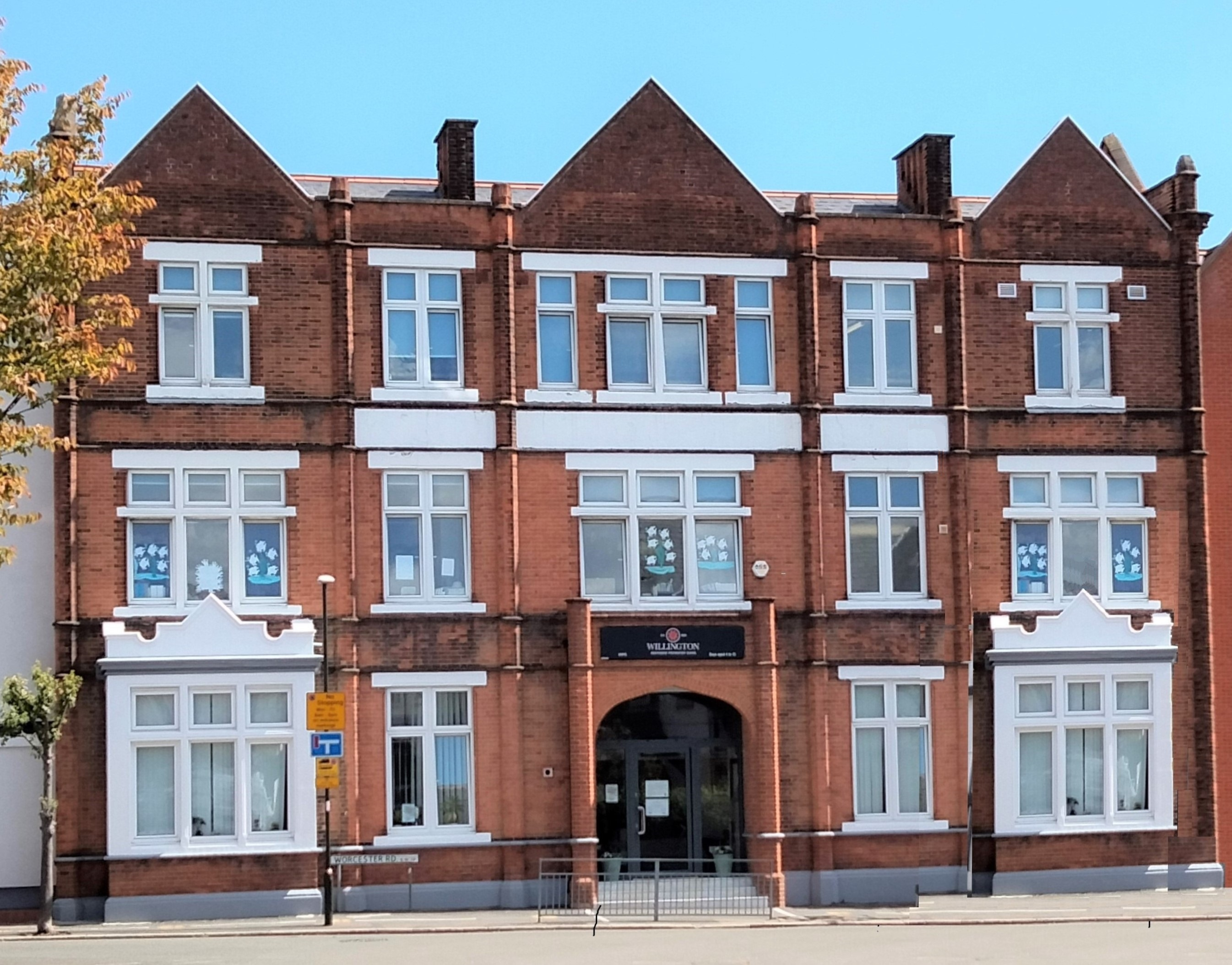
- Current school building

Location
- Worcester Road; Wimbledon, SW19 7QQ; England
- Coordinates: 51°25′28″N 0°12′18″W

Information
- Type: Independent preparatory
- Motto: Non scholae sed vitae discimus (We do not learn for school, but for life)
- Established: 1885 +
- Founders: Annie & Ada Hale
- Department for Education URN: 101069 Tables
- Ofsted: Reports
- Headmaster: Keith Brown MA, BSc (Hons), PGCE
- Gender: Mixed
- Age: 3 to 11
- Enrolment: c. 230
- Website: http://www.willingtonschool.co.uk/

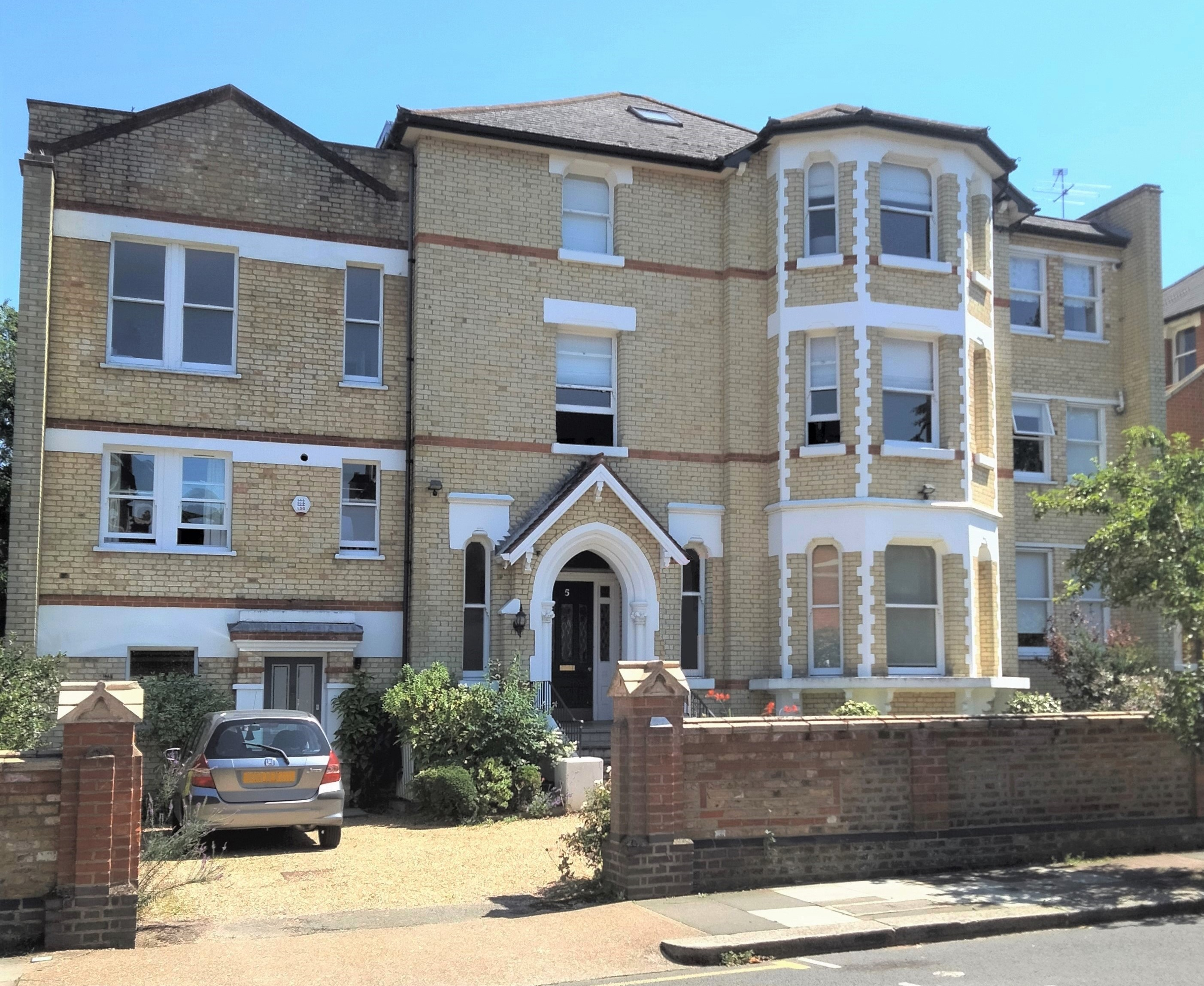
5 Colinette Road, Putney. School 1916–90. Building is now flats

Willington Independent Preparatory School is situated in Wimbledon, south-west London.

== History ==
The school was founded in 1885. It was situated in Putney, London, to cater for the boys of the growing middle class population of the area. The school's main purpose was to prepare pupils for public school entrance exams, with a number gaining scholarships, the first in 1888 to Francis Whipple for attendance at Merchant Taylors' School. Many scholarships for academic, sport, music and art are still awarded to students.

After being housed at other villa-type sites in West Putney, the school moved to 5 Colinette Road in 1916, where it remained until 1990. By the early 1900s it had a role of about seventy boys including, from 1910 to 1921, about ten boarders, looked after by a matron. After the outbreak of the Second World War in 1939, the majority of boys were evacuated to Uckfield in Sussex, and after fall of France in 1940 to Tawstock Court in Devon. By September 1942 all boys had returned to London, with the school resuming as before. In 1961 the school became a charitable trust, it previously being owned by the Head, who sold it on to the next incumbent. Two new wings were added to the school building in 1968 and 1971, with the facilities improved and modernised. By 1975 the role had increased to 150. The school moved to its current location in Wimbledon in 1990.

It was originally established and run as a school for boys aged 7 to 13, with the minimum age lowered to 4 in the 1930s. In 2020 it began a transition to become co-educational, offering an education to both boys and girls, aged 3 to 11.

== Students ==
Notable former students include:

- Dallas Bower, film and radio director and producer
- Maurice Bowra, classical scholar and academic
- Esmond Knight, actor
- Basil Liddell Hart, historian and military theorist
- John McAnally, vice-admiral
- Sir Frank Newnes, 2nd Baronet, publisher and MP
- Lawrence Oates, Antarctic explorer
- Graham Pollard, bookseller and bibliographer
- Robert Renwick, 1st Baron Renwick, businessman
- Francis Whipple, mathematician and meteorologist
