= Alice Dew-Smith =

- Born: 1859; Auckland
- Died: 1949 (aged 89–90); Surrey
- Occupation: Writer
- Spouse(s): Albert George Dew-Smith

Alice Mary Lloyd Dew-Smith (1859 – 1949) was a New Zealand-born writer, suffragist, feminist, and spiritualist.

Alice Mary Lloyd was born on 1859 in Auckland, New Zealand, daughter of the Rev. John Frederick Lloyd, archdeacon of Waitemata. She and her family moved to England in the 1870s. She attended Newnham College, Cambridge and while there began a lifelong friendship with Jane Ellen Harrison. She taught at Wimbledon High School and worked as a journalist. She was one of a number of writers for the women-only column called "Wares of Autolycus" that was published in the Pall Mall Gazette.

Her first book, Soul Shapes (1890), developed from a party game. Dew-Smith believed she could "visualize souls" and classified them into four color categories, with the blue soul being superior. Her collection A White Umbrella and Other Stories (1895), published under the name Sarnia, included "A Ballet in the Skies", where the narrator takes a trip to the Moon using flowers. Her stories of plant and animals published in the Pall Mall Gazette were collected in two volumes, Confidences of an Amateur Gardener (1897) and Tom Tug and Others (1898). The latter, illustrated by Elinor Mary Darwin, were stories told from the point of view of cats, dogs, insects, and a Mexican marmot named Whishton.

In 1895, she married inventor Albert George Dew Smith. After his death in 1903, she moved to Rye, where she was a neighbor of Henry James.

Sarnia died in 1949 in Surrey.

== Bibliography ==
- Soul Shapes (1890)
- A White Umbrella and Other Stories. (as Sarnia) 1 vol. London: T. Fisher Unwin, 1895.
- Confidences of an Amateur Gardener. London: Seely and Co., 1897.
- Tom Tug and Others: Sketches in a Domestic Menagerie. London: Seely and Co., 1898.
- The Diary of a Dreamer. 1 vol. London: T. Fisher Unwin, 1900.
- Spiritual Gravitation. Cambridge: W. Heffner & Son, 1927.
