= Department of History and Philosophy of Science, University of Cambridge =

Academic department of University of Cambridge

Coordinates: 52.2026°N 0.1192°E

Department of History and Philosophy of Science
- Type: Department
- Parent institution: University of Cambridge
- Postgraduates: c. 70
- Location: Cambridge, Cambridgeshire, England
- Website: hps.cam.ac.uk/

The Department of History and Philosophy of Science (HPS), of the University of Cambridge is the largest department of history and philosophy of science in the United Kingdom. A majority of its submissions received maximum ratings of 4* and 3* in the 2014 REF (Research Excellence Framework). Located in the historic buildings of the Old Physical Chemistry Laboratories on Free School Lane, Cambridge, the department teaches undergraduate courses towards the Cambridge Tripos and graduate courses including a taught Masters and PhD supervision in the field of HPS. The department shares its premises with the Whipple Museum and Whipple Library which provide important resources for its teaching and research.

== Academic staff ==
The Department of HPS at Cambridge employs fifteen full-time teaching staff, approximately thirty research staff, numerous supervisors and research associates from departments and colleges across the University of Cambridge, in addition to external supervisors and examiners. A long-standing head of department was the noted Professor Peter Lipton, who served until his unexpected death in 2007. He was followed as head of department by the late Professor John Forrester, an international authority in the History of Mind, and a leading figure on Sigmund Freud and the history of psychoanalysis. Professor Jim Secord became head of the department in 2013 and was succeeded in 2016 by Professor Liba Taub. The current head is Professor Anna Alexandrova. Other senior staff include Professor Tim Lewens, Professor Lauren Kassell, Professor Nick Hopwood and retired Professor Simon Schaffer.

== Degree courses ==
The department offers a nine-month MPhil course in history, philosophy and sociology of science, medicine and technology. It also supervises graduate students for the Cambridge PhD in HPS and provides advisors in the related fields of research in history, philosophy and social science. Together with the Departments of Sociology and Social Anthropology, it also sponsors a nine-month MPhil in health, medicine and society.

Undergraduate teaching and supervision is provided for students who have completed their first year at Cambridge. Due to the interdisciplinary nature of the Cambridge Tripos system, undergraduates from a wide range of fields may study HPS, although entry is predominantly through the Natural Sciences Tripos. The resources of the Whipple Museum provide for first-hand study of scientific instruments which often provide topics for student dissertations.

== History and philosophy of medicine ==
The department is an active centre for the history of medicine and for philosophy of biomedical science and medical ethics. It played a major role in the Wellcome Trust funded Generation to Reproduction project at Cambridge, led by Professor Nick Hopwood, and hosted seminars and day conferences in this field. Another major Wellcome-funded project has made available a remarkable corpus of English medical casebooks from the sixteenth and seventeenth centuries.
