= Cambridge Scientific Instrument Company =

- Industry: Technology; Manufacturing
- Founded: 1881
- Founder: Robert Fulcher; Horace Darwin; Albert George Dew-Smith
- Products: Scientific instruments

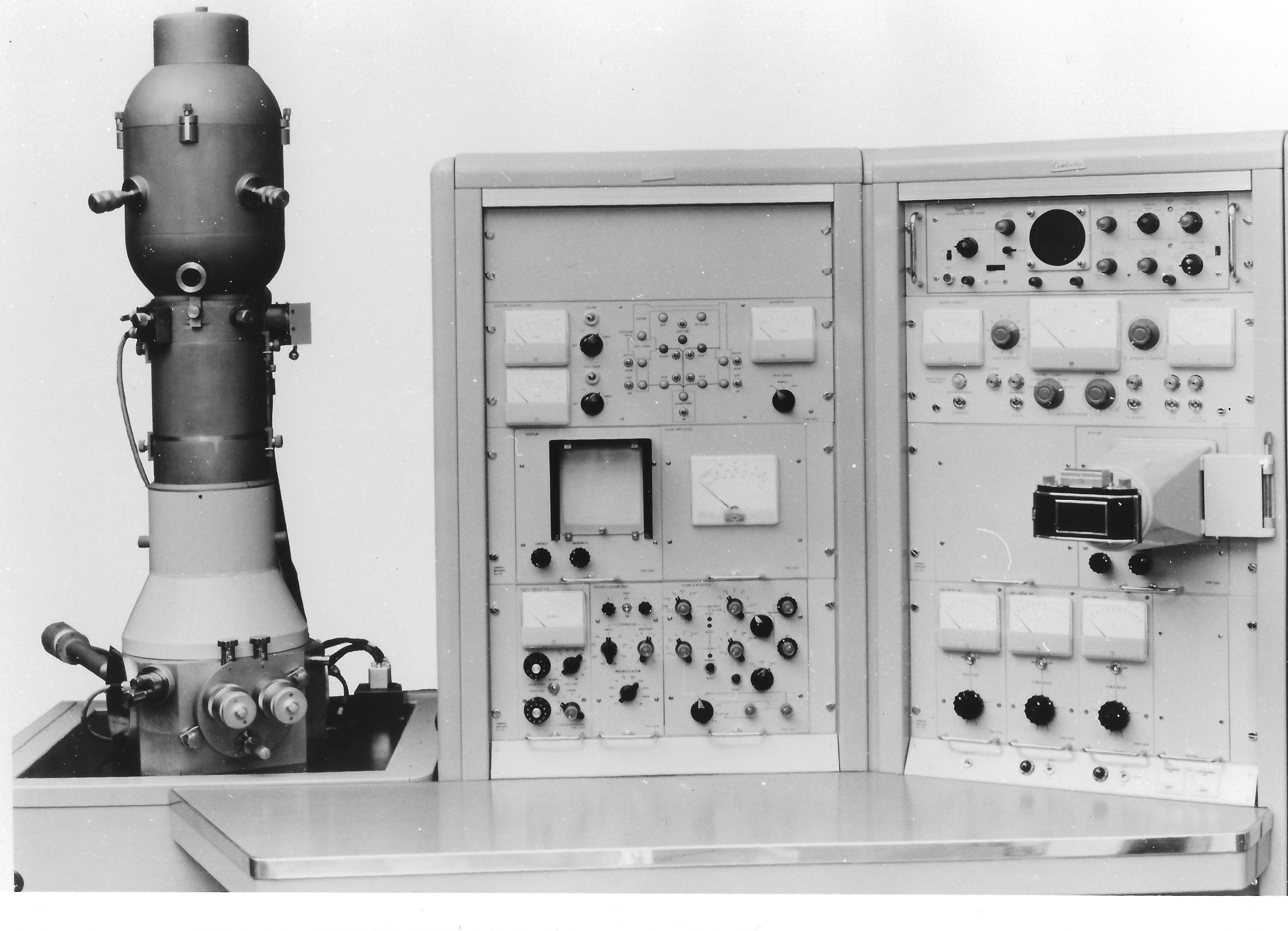
Stereoscan MK1, the first commercial scanning electron microscope, was produced by the Cambridge Scientific Instrument Company in 1965.

Cambridge Scientific Instrument Company was a company founded in the late 1870s by Robert Fulcher. The original use of the company was to service instruments for the Cambridge physiology department. In the beginning, the company was financially driven by a friend of Horace Darwin (1851–1928), Albert Dew-Smith (1848–1903). Eventually, Fulcher was fully replaced in the company by Darwin and Dew-Smith, in 1881, who would then become the sole co-owners. In light of the company being taken over, by Darwin and Dew-Smith, it grew in regard and size. By the time the company was about 15 years old, in 1891, Horace Darwin became the sole owner of the company.

Horace Darwin, the son of Charles Darwin, was first apprenticed to an engineering firm in Kent, and returned to Cambridge in 1875. Dew-Smith was an engineer, photographer and instrument maker who was at Trinity College, Cambridge with Darwin. Darwin's grandson Erasmus Darwin Barlow was later chairman.

Designed between 1883/84, the rocking microtome, otherwise known as The "Darwin Rocker", was one of Darwin's most successful designs which continued to be manufactured until the 1970s. Another famous instrument manufactured by the Cambridge Scientific Instrument Company and created by Horace Darwin was the micrometer used with "worm stone". This was used to study and analyze the rate at which worms would bury stones in the ground.

Their partnership became a limited company in 1895. In 1920 it took over the R.W. Paul Instrument Company of London, and became The Cambridge and Paul Instrument Company Ltd. The name was shortened to the Cambridge Instrument Company Ltd. in 1924 when it was converted to a Public limited company.

In 1928 when Horace Darwin died the company and the instruments continued to progress rapidly. Charles G. Darwin (1887 - 1962), Horace's nephew, took over as chairman of the board. Robert Whipple (1871 - 1953) would also become Managing Director and share that role with Cecil Mason, until Darwin moved on to be head of the National Physical Laboratory and Whipple moved to be chairman of the board. Whipple stayed as chairman until his death in 1953.

Several early employees went on to further renown, including Robert Whipple, who was appointed personal assistant to Horace Darwin in 1898, and later became Managing Director and Chairman of the company. His collection of scientific instruments later formed the basis of the Whipple Museum of the History of Science in 1944. William G. Pye, who had joined as foreman in 1880, left in 1898 to form the W.G. Pye Instrument Company with his son, which ultimately become the Pye group of companies.

From 1960 the company started to decline and struggled to turn a profit. In 1968 the company was bought by the George Kent group, who continued to use the Cambridge name on some products. In 1974 George Kent was itself acquired by Brown Boveri; as part of the acquisition process the former Cambridge Instruments operation was spun out as part of Scientific and Medical Instruments, which a year later renamed itself the Cambridge Instrument Co. thereby reviving the brand. Losses continued, so in 1976 the company received a government bailout that made it part of the National Enterprise Board (NEB). The NEB performed a major reorganisation but retained the Cambridge Instruments name, before privatising the company again in 1979. In 1980, Cambridge Instruments merged its medical instruments business with GEC Medical Equipment and American Optical to form Picker International. The Cambridge Instruments company owned 20% of Picker, with the other 80% owned by General Electric Co. In 1983 Cambridge Instruments acquired GEC Londex and in 1987 it floated on the London Stock Exchange. By that time Cambridge Instruments was a dormant holding company, manufacturing no instruments itself but owning parts of other businesses that did. After several further transfers of ownership, it was eventually dissolved in 2021.

== Sources ==
- Cattermole, M.J.G. & Wolfe, A.F., Horace Darwin's Shop: A History of the Cambridge Scientific Company 1878–1968, (Adam Hilger, 1987) ISBN 0-85274-569-9
- Wilson, D. (1987). Instrument Makers. Science, 237(4816), 783-783.
- Learner, R. (1987). Horace Darwin and the Cambridge Scientific Instrument Company. Contemporary Physics, 28(3), 323.
