= Robert T. Whipple =

Self help book author

Robert Thornton Whipple
- Born: May 18, 1946 (age 80); Binghamton, New York, United States
- Other name: Bob Whipple
- Occupations: Author, businessperson
- Known for: Expertise and publications on leadership and trust in business

Robert "Bob" Thornton Whipple (born May 18, 1946) is an American author and business executive who has written four books on leadership and trust. He is CEO of Leadergrow Inc, a leadership development firm located in Hilton, N.Y. He is best known for his methods of creating an environment of trust in organizations, communicating online in ways that build trust, and building trust during mergers and acquisitions.

Whipple has been published in several Leadership and Training journals including Leadership Excellence Magazine and T+D Training + Development Journal. He is a frequent contributor to The Rochester Business Journal. In 2008 and 2011 he was named one of the top 100 thought leaders in the country on the topic of leadership development by Leadership Excellence Magazine.

His books include, The Trust Factor: Advanced Leadership for Professionals, published in 2003 by Productivity Publications, Understanding E-Body Language: Building Trust Online, published in 2006 by Productivity Publications, Leading With Trust is Like Sailing Downwind, published in 2009 by Executive Excellence Publications, and "Trust in Transition: Navigating Organizational Change" published in 2014 by ASTD Press.

== Early life and education ==
Whipple was born in Binghamton, New York on May 18, 1946. He earned a BS in Mechanical Engineering from Union College (1968), an MS in Chemical Engineering from Syracuse University (1971), and an MBA from the William E. Simon Graduate School of Business Administration, University of Rochester (1975).

In 2008, he was certified (recertified in 2011, 2014, 2017, 2020, and 2023) by the Association for Talent Development as a Certified Professional in Talent Development (CPTD).

== Career ==
Whipple worked for Eastman Kodak Company from 1968 to 2001 in the manufacture of photographic film. He worked in leadership positions for the majority his career including 10 years as a Division Manager in Film Manufacturing.

He has taught at a number of graduate and undergraduate schools including Syracuse University, Roberts Wesleyan College Strategic Leadership Program, St. John Fisher College OL/HRD Masters Program, and University of Phoenix Online. He has also taught through the Greater Rochester Chamber of Commerce since 2004. Using the name of "The Trust Ambassador" Whipple has consulted with over 120 organizations and leadership teams on how to build higher levels of trust.

Whipple is a member of the National Speakers Association, and speaks across the United States, and has been featured in a variety of radio programs internationally. He is the past Chair of the National Leadership Development Team of the American Society for Training and Development (ASTD) and served on the National Advisors for Chapters Team for ASTD. He is a founding member of the GVASTD OD SIG in Rochester. He is a founding member of the Alliance of Trusted Business Experts, which is part of Trust Across America: Trust Around the World, and has been named one of the top 100 thought leaders in Trust each year since 2010. He serves as Chairman of the Board of Elevate Rochester, and organization devoted to celebrating ethical cultures in organizations and is a Featured Speaker for the Rochester Professional Consultants Network.

He is a frequent guest author on a number of websites and blogs, including: Elephants at Work, TBD Consulting, The New World of Work, and Trust Across America. He has also filled in as Guest Host of the Trust Across America Radio Program on Voice America Radio.

== Recognition ==
- (2011) Named CNY ASTD BEST Learning and Performance Consultant.
- (2008, 2012) Named one of the Top 15 Thought Leaders in the US for Leadership Development by Leadership Excellence Magazine
- (2014) Awarded Lifetime Achievement Award by Trust Across America: Trust Around the World.
- Vistage - Listed as an “Accredited Speaker” in Vistage System.
- ASTD and GV ASTD Chair of National Leadership Development Team 2007-2009, National Advisors for Chapters Team, President. Granted Lifetime Achievement Award in 2019
- National Speakers Association Member
- Focus Network Granted “Expert” status
- Speakermix Listed as an “All Star” speaker.
- Listed as one of the top 100 Leadership Speakers by Inc. Magazine 2015,2016,2017
- Making an Impact Award NHRA, 2018
- ATD Rochester Chapter Lifetime Achievement Award in 2019
- Consultants Consultant by RPCN, 2020

== Bibliography ==
- The Trust Factor: Advanced Leadership for Professionals (2003) (ISBN 0-9729119-0-1)
- Understanding E-Body Language: Building Trust Online (2006) (ISBN 0-9729119-5-2)
- Leading With Trust is Like Sailing Downwind (2009) (ISBN 978-1-930771-31-4)
- Trust in Transition: Navigating Organizational Change (2014) (ISBN 978-1562869243)
