= King's Observatory =

Private house and former observatory near Kew, Richmond, London

The King's Observatory
- Kew Observatory
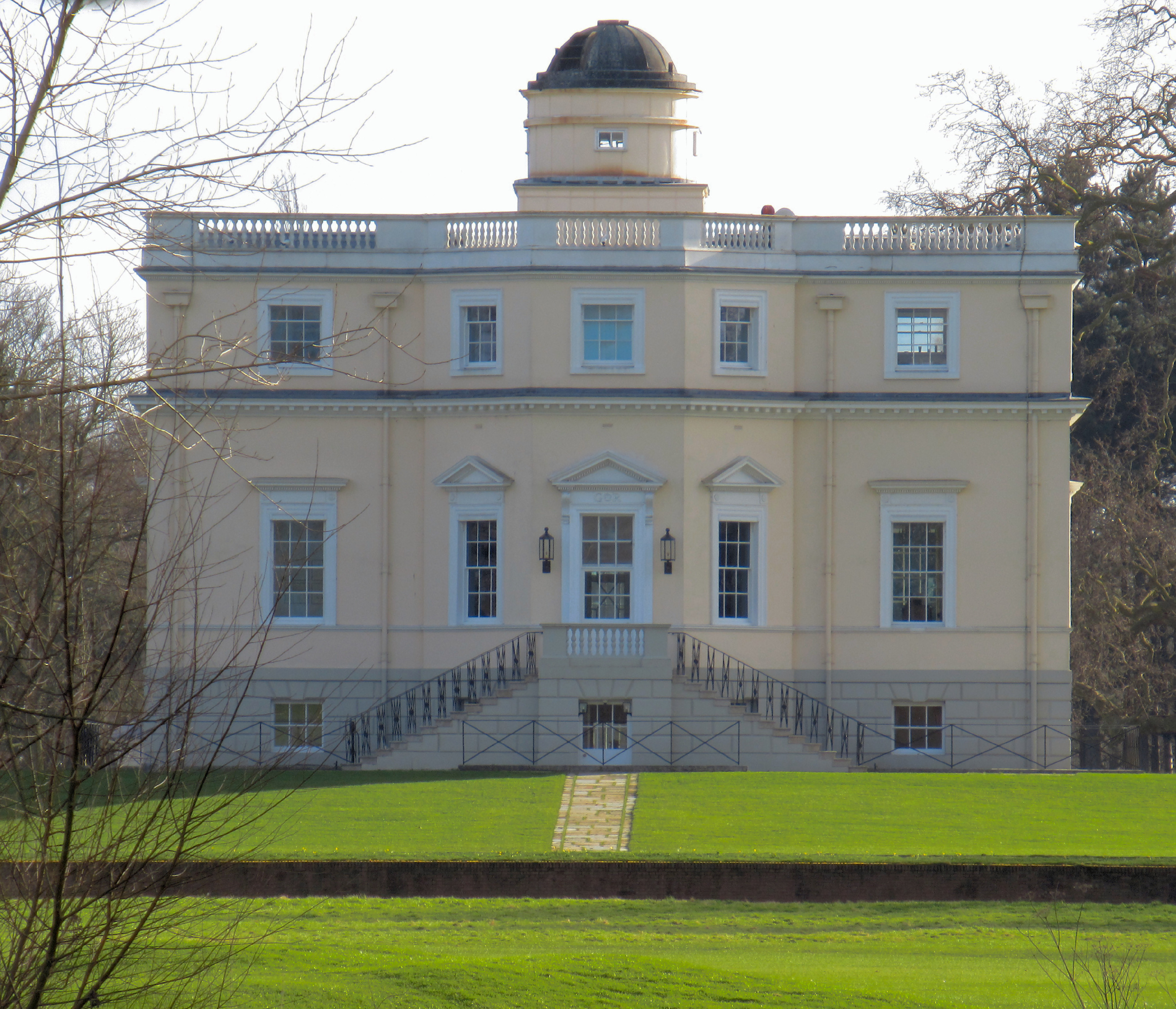
- The King's Observatory in winter

- Location within London Borough of Richmond upon Thames
- 51°28′08″N 0°18′53″W
- Location: Old Deer Park
- Nearest city: Richmond, London

History
- Built: 1769
- Built for: George III of the United Kingdom
- Original use: Astronomical and terrestrial magnetic observatory

Site notes
- Architect: Sir William Chambers
- Current use: Private dwelling
- Owner: Crown Estate
- Website: www.kingsobservatory.co.uk

Listed Building – Grade I
- Official name: Kew Observatory
- Designated: 10 January 1950
- Reference no.: 1357729

The King's Observatory (called for many years the Kew Observatory) is a Grade I listed building in Richmond, London. Now a private dwelling, it formerly housed an astronomical and terrestrial magnetic observatory founded by King George III. The original design by architect Sir William Chambers influenced the architecture of two Irish observatories: Armagh Observatory in Northern Ireland, and Dunsink Observatory near Dublin.

== Location ==
The observatory and its grounds are located within the grounds of the Royal Mid-Surrey Golf Club, which is part of the Old Deer Park of the former Richmond Palace in Richmond, historically in Surrey and now in the London Borough of Richmond upon Thames. The former royal manor of Kew lies to the immediate north. The observatory grounds overlie to the south the site of the former Sheen Priory, the Carthusian monastery established by King Henry V in 1414. The observatory is not publicly accessible, and obscuring woodlands mean that it cannot be viewed from outside the golf course, which is not open to the general public. The observatory is sometimes open to the public.

== Personnel ==
=== King's Observers ===
- 1769, Stephen Charles Triboudet Demainbray (1710–1782)
- 1782, Stephen George Francis Triboudet Demainbray (1759–1854)

Co-Observer

- 1814, Stephen Peter Rigaud (1774–1839)

=== Superintendents ===
- 1842, Sir Francis Ronalds (1788–1873)
- 1852 John Welsh (1824–1859)
- 1859, Balfour Stewart (1828–1887)
- 1871, Samuel Jeffrey
- 1876, George Mathews Whipple (1842–1893)
- 1893, Charles Chree (1860–1928)
- 1925, Francis John Welsh Whipple (1876–1943)
- 1939, James Martin Stagg (1900–1975)
- 1939, Sir George Simpson (1878–1965)

== History ==
The observatory was completed in 1769, in time for King George III's observation of the transit of Venus that occurred on 3 June in that year. It was located close to Richmond Lodge, the country residence of the royal family between 1764 and 1771.

In 1842, the by then empty building was taken on by the British Association for the Advancement of Science and became widely known as the Kew Observatory. Francis Ronalds was the inaugural Honorary Director for the next decade and founded the observatory's enduring reputation.

Responsibility for the facility was transferred to the Royal Society in 1871. The National Physical Laboratory was established there in 1900 and from 1910 it housed the Meteorological Office. The Met Office closed the observatory in 1980. The geomagnetic instruments had already been relocated to Eskdalemuir Observatory in Dumfries and Galloway, Scotland in 1908 after the advent of electrification in London led to interference with their operations.

== Scientific achievements ==
=== Observing the transit of Venus on 3 June 1769 ===
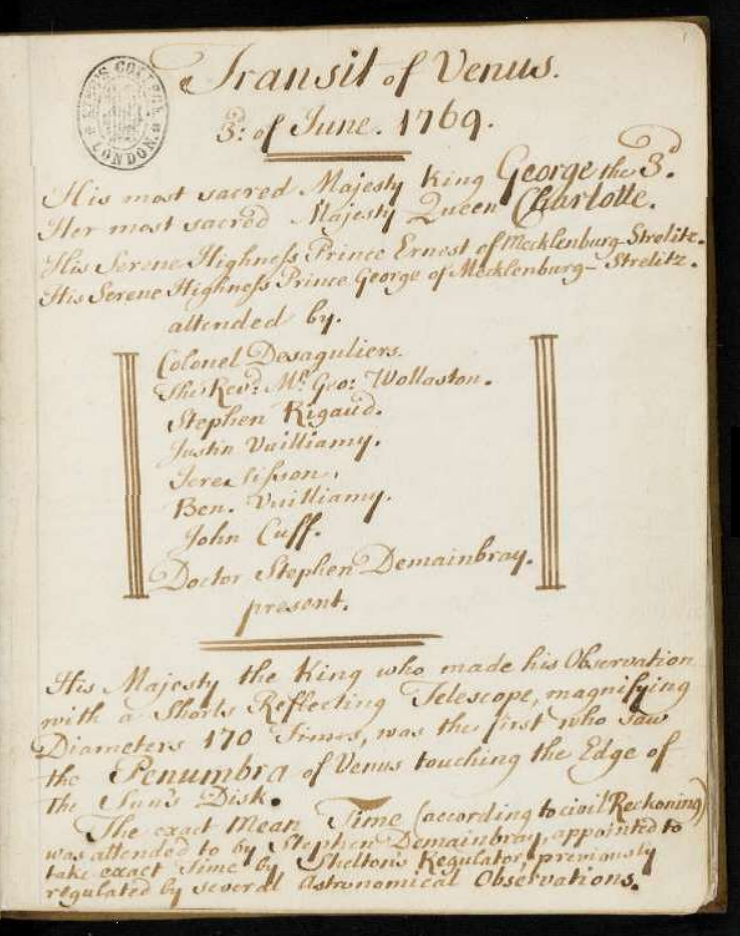
Extract from Observations on the Transit of Venus, a manuscript notebook from the collections of George III, showing George, his wife Queen Charlotte and those attending them, including Demainbray.

A contemporary report by Stephen Demainbray, the superintendent of the observatory, says: "His Majesty the King who made his observation with a Shorts reflecting telescope, magnifying Diameters 170 Times, was the first to view the Penumbra of Venus touching the Edge of the Sun's Disk. The exact mean time (according to civil Reckoning) was attended to by Stephen Demainbray, appointed to take exact time by Shelton's Regulator, previously regulated by several astronomical observations."

=== Self-registering instruments ===
Francis Ronalds invented many meteorological, magnetic and electrical instruments at Kew, which saw long-term use around the world. These included the first successful cameras in 1845 to record the variations of parameters such as atmospheric pressure, temperature, humidity, atmospheric electricity and geomagnetism through the day and night. His photo-barograph was used by Robert Fitzroy from 1862 in making the UK's first official weather forecasts at the Meteorological Office. The network of observing stations set-up in 1867 by the Met Office to assist in understanding the weather was equipped with his cameras – some of these remained in use at Kew until the observatory's closure in 1980.

=== Atmospheric electricity observations ===
Ronalds also established a sophisticated atmospheric electricity observing system at Kew with a long copper rod protruding through the dome of the observatory and a suite of novel electrometers and electrographs to manually record the data. He supplied this equipment to facilities in England, Spain, France, Italy, India (Colaba and Trivandrum) and the Arctic with the goal of delineating atmospheric electricity on a global scale. At Kew, two-hourly data was recorded in the Reports of the British Association between 1844 and 1847.

An entirely new system, providing continuous automatic recording, was installed by Lord Kelvin personally in the early 1860s. This device, based on Kelvin's water dropper potential equaliser with photographic recording, was known as the Kew electrograph. It provided the backbone of a long and almost continuous series of potential gradient measurements which finished in 1980. A secondary system of measurement, operating on different principles, was designed and implemented by the Nobel laureate CTR Wilson, from which records begin in 1906 until the closure of the Observatory. These measurements, which complement those of the Kelvin electrograph, were made on fine days at 1500 GMT. Beyond their applications in atmospheric electricity, the electrograph and Wilson apparatus have been shown to be useful for reconstructing past air pollution changes.

=== Testing timepiece movements ===
In the early 1850s, the facility began performing a role in assessing and rating barometers, thermometers, chronometers, watches, sextants and other scientific instruments for accuracy; this duty was transferred to the National Physical Laboratory in 1910. An instrument which passed the tests was awarded a "Kew Certificate", a hallmark of excellence.

As marine navigation adopted the use of mechanical timepieces, their accuracy became more important. The need for precision resulted in the development of a testing regime involving various astronomical observatories. In Europe, Neuchâtel Observatory, Geneva Observatory, Besançon Astronomical Observatory and Kew were examples of prominent observatories that tested timepiece movements for accuracy. The testing process lasted for many days, typically 45. Each movement was tested in five positions and two temperatures, in ten series of four or five days each. The tolerances for error were much finer than any other standard, including the modern COSC standard. Movements that passed the stringent tests were issued a certification from the observatory called a Bulletin de Marche, signed by the directeur of the observatory. The Bulletin de Marche stated the testing criteria and the actual performance of the movement. A movement with a Bulletin de Marche from an observatory became known as an Observatory Chronometer, and was issued a chronometer reference number by the observatory.

The role of the observatories in assessing the accuracy of mechanical timepieces was instrumental in driving the mechanical watchmaking industry toward higher and higher levels of accuracy. As a result, modern high quality mechanical watch movements have an extremely high degree of accuracy. However, no mechanical movement could ultimately compare to the accuracy of a quartz movement. Accordingly, such chronometer certification ceased in the late 1960s and early 1970s with the advent of the quartz watch movement.

== Later use ==
In 1981 the facility was returned to the Crown Estate Commissioners and reverted to its original name, "King’s Observatory". In 1985 the observatory was refurbished and transformed into commercial offices; new brick buildings were added. From 1986 to 2011 it was used by Autoglass (now Belron) as their UK head office. Since 1989 the lease has been held by Robbie Brothers of Kew Holdings Limited. In 2014 Richmond upon Thames London Borough Council granted planning permission for the observatory to be used as a private single family dwelling.

In 1999, landscape architect Kim Wilkie was commissioned to prepare a master plan linking the observatory's Grade I landscape to Kew Gardens, Syon Park and Richmond. These proposals were accepted by Kew Holdings Limited. The basement and first floors are now family rooms, bedrooms and kitchen. The two octagon rooms retain their original cabinets. The entrance octagon room originally would have housed George III's scientific instruments but displays the owners collection of Japanese ceramics and has an upper gallery installed by the Met Office with an Art Deco balustrade. The library octagon retains the octagonal Autoglass board table with a model of the site before restoration. The two side rooms have lost original features apart from their windows. The lounge has been restored as a Georgian room with two large portraits of George III and Queen Charlotte and a decorated modern carving of his coat of arms. The dining room is decorated with modern, hand-painted Chinese wallpaper, based on the 1772 painting commissioned by Alexander Hume, now in the Hong Kong Maritime Museum. The grounds have also been restored and are now surrounded by a ha-ha with a pond, all auxiliary buildings have been demolished apart from two old 'Magnetic huts' dating from the time of the NPL.

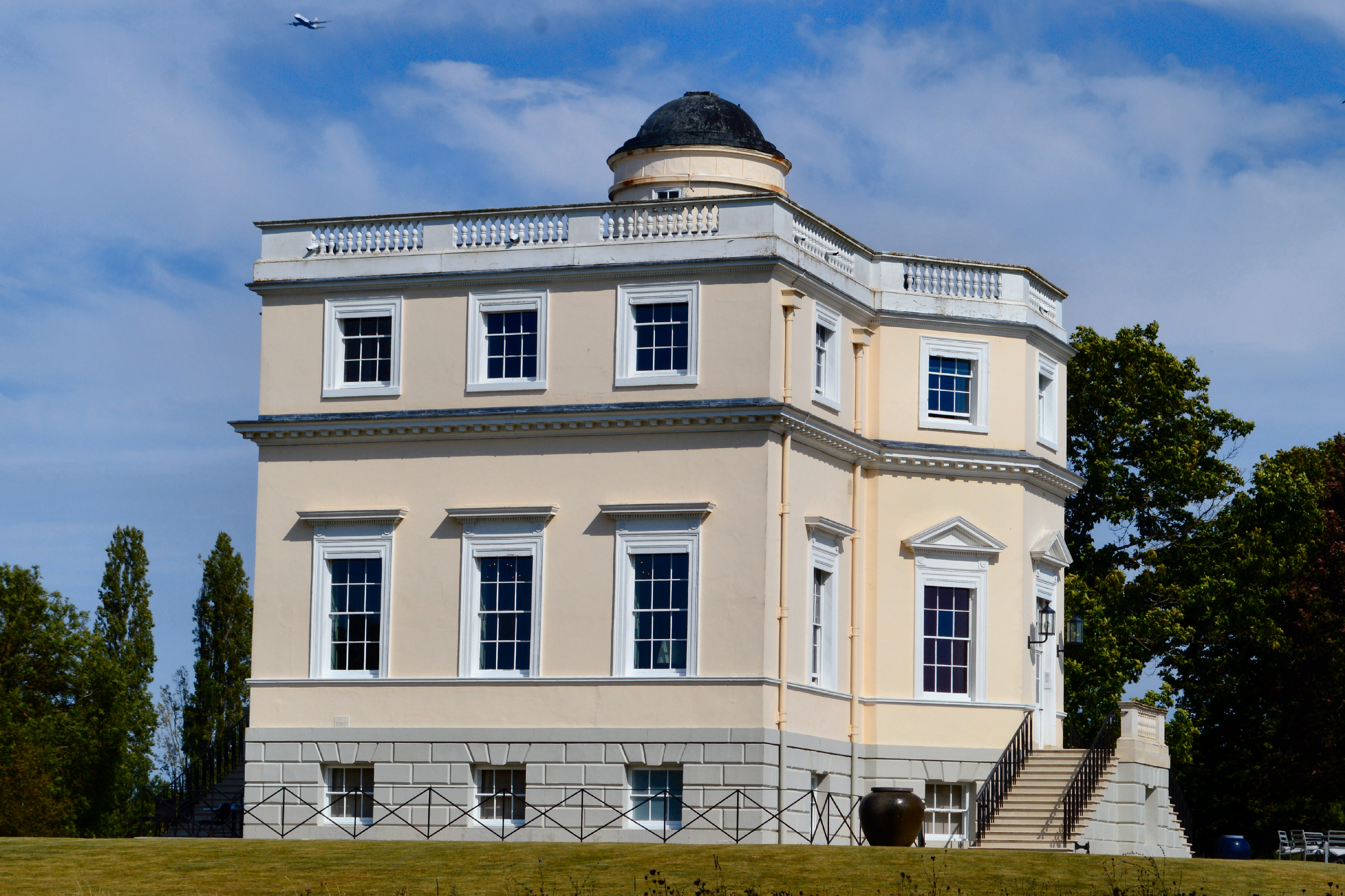
The King's Observatory

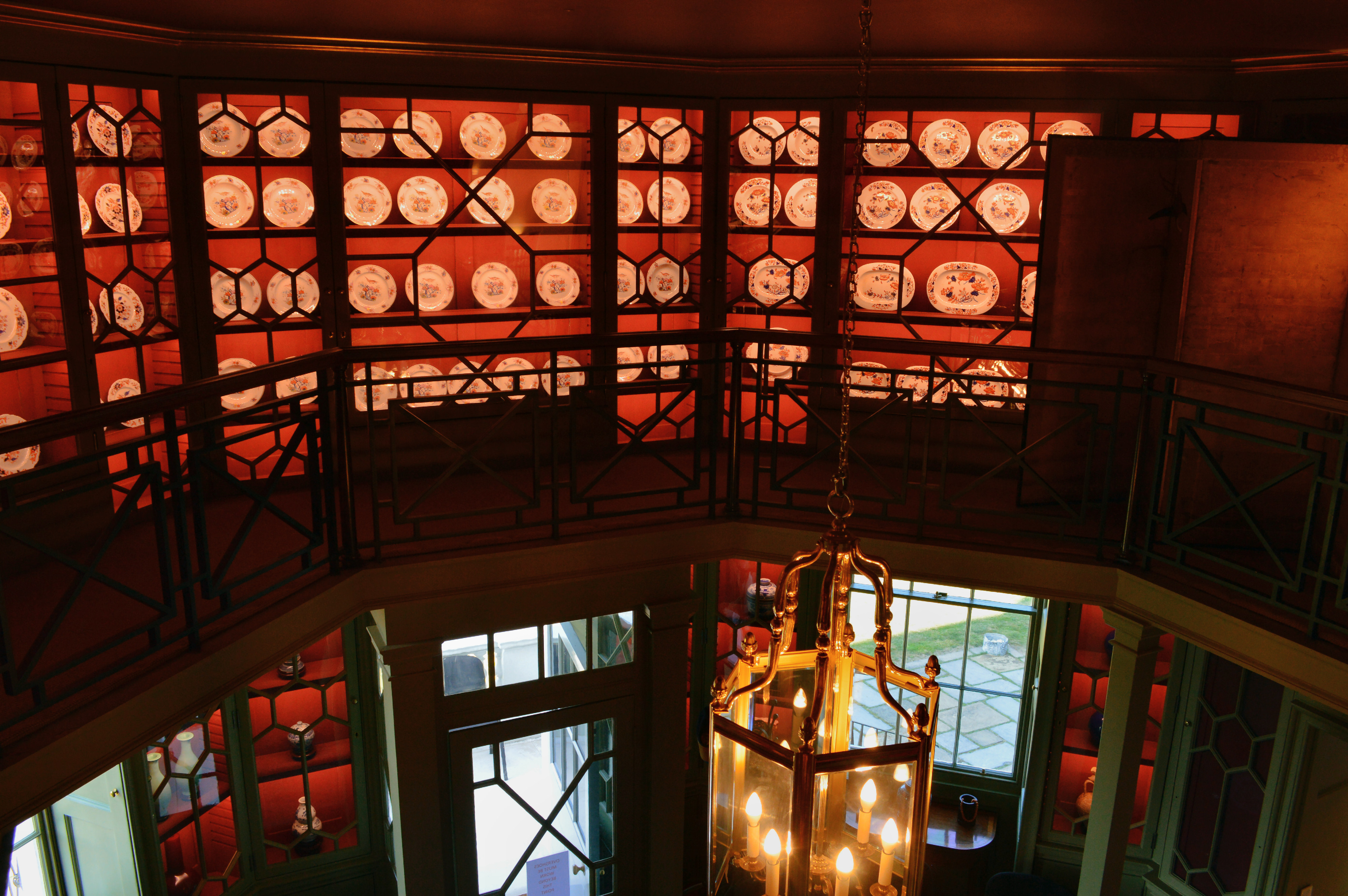
Entrance room

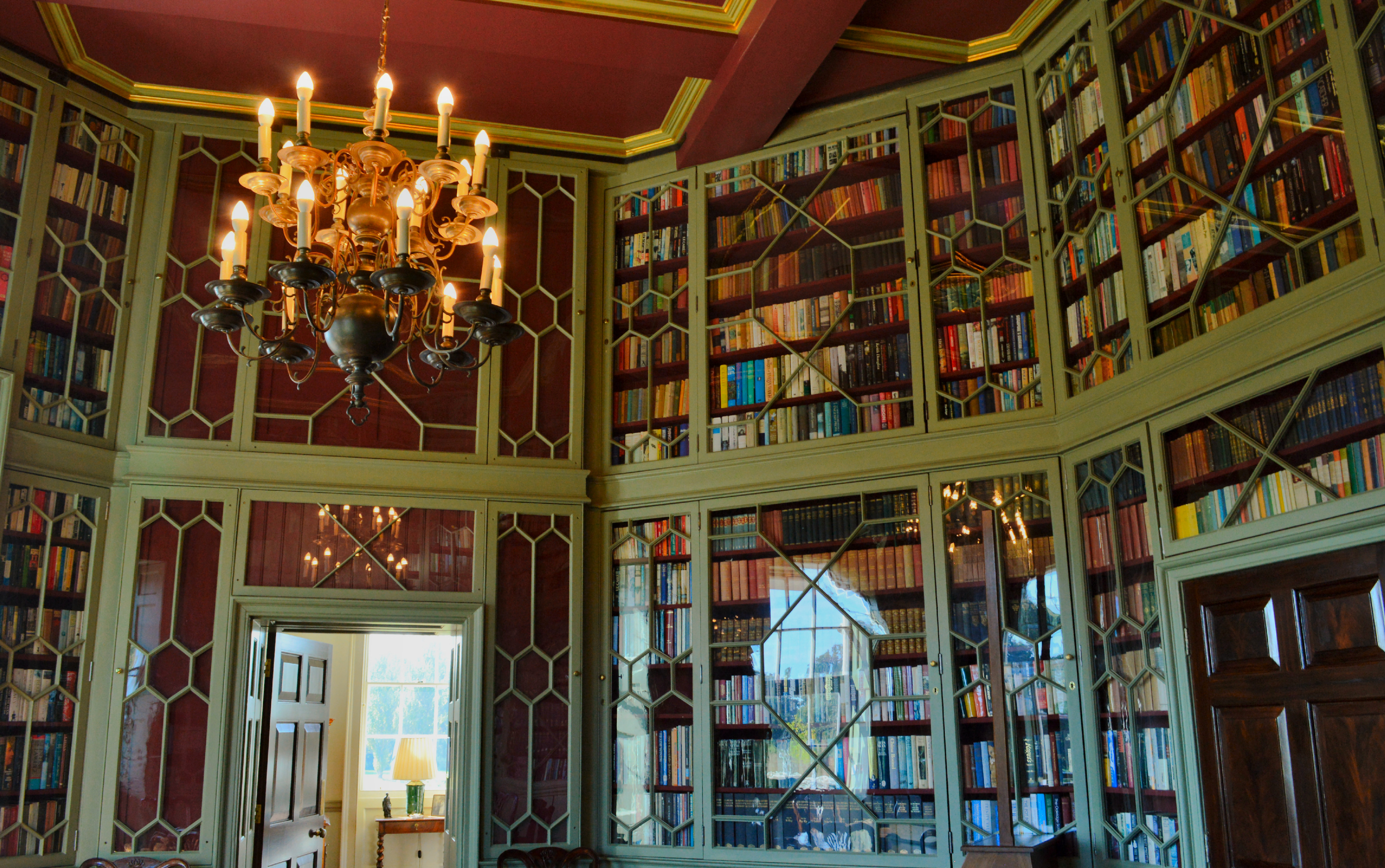
The Library

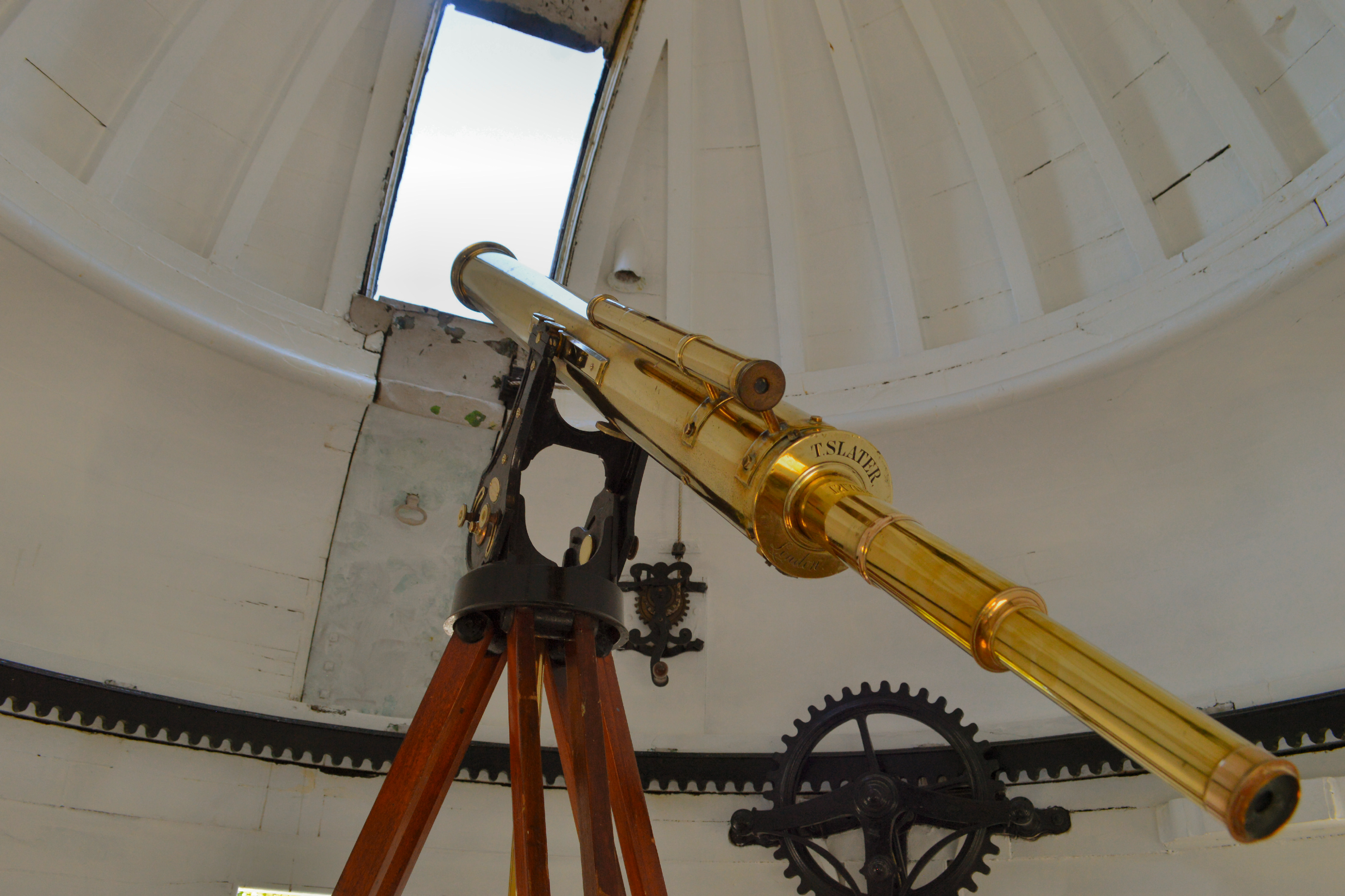
The observatory dome

== In art ==
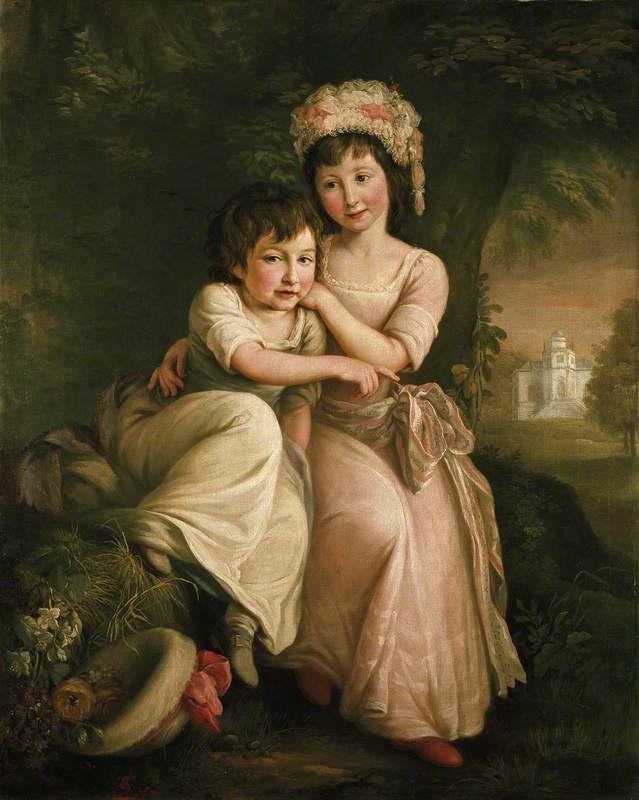
Stephen Peter Rigaud and Mary Anne Rigaud, with the Kew Observatory in the background

The Ashmolean Museum of Art and Archaeology in Oxford has a portrait, Peter Rigaud and Mary Anne Rigaud, by the 18th-century painter John Francis Rigaud. His portrait of his nephew and niece, exhibited at the Royal Academy in 1778, shows Stephen Peter Rigaud (1774–1839) (who became a mathematical historian and astronomer, and Savilian Chair of Geometry and Savilian Professor of Astronomy at the University of Oxford) and his elder sister. The picture, painted when they were aged four and seven, shows them in a park landscape with the observatory (where their father was observer) in the background. Although described here as Richmond Park, topographical considerations make it more likely that the park portrayed is Old Deer Park, where the observatory is situated.

== See also ==
- Eskdalemuir Observatory
