= Whipple Museum of the History of Science =

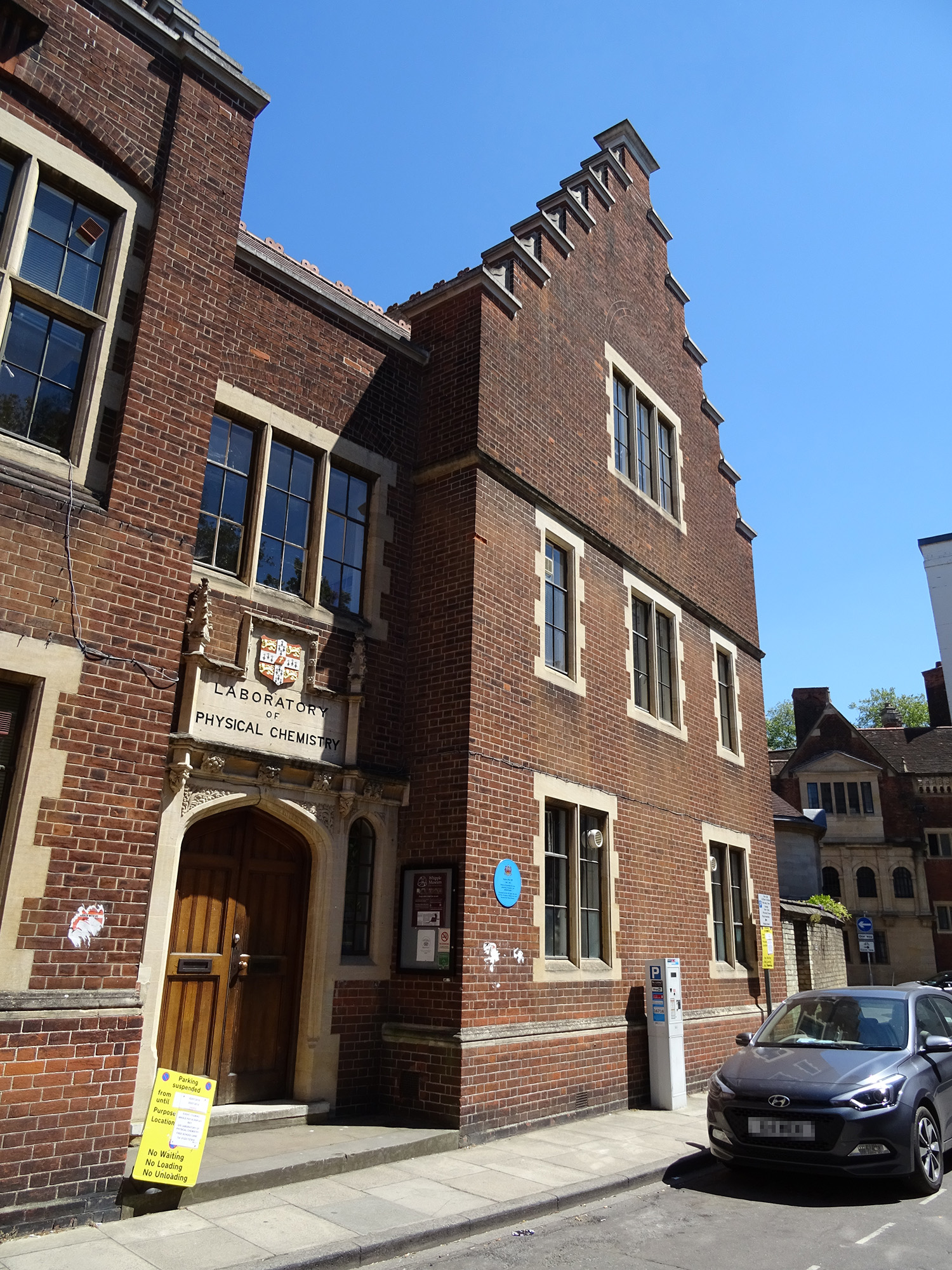
- Whipple Museum of the History of Science, in Free School Lane, Cambridge
- Established: 1944
- Location: Cambridge
- Coordinates: 52°12′00″N 0°07′12″E
- Type: University Museum
- Accreditation: Arts Council England accredited
- Collections: Scientific instruments, apparatus, models, pictures, prints, photographs, books and other material related to the history of science
- Visitors: 26,778 (2025)
- Founder: Robert Whipple
- Director: Dr Joshua Nall
- Owner: University of Cambridge

University of Cambridge Museums
- Fitzwilliam Museum; Kettle's Yard; Museum of Archaeology and Anthropology; Museum of Classical Archaeology; Whipple Museum of the History of Science; Sedgwick Museum of Earth Sciences; The Polar Museum; Museum of Zoology

The Whipple Museum of the History of Science is a museum attached to the University of Cambridge, England, which houses an extensive collection of scientific instruments, apparatus, models, pictures, prints, photographs, books and other material related to the history of science. It is located in the former Perse School on Free School Lane, Cambridge. The museum was founded in 1944, when Robert Whipple presented his collection of scientific instruments to the University of Cambridge. The museum's collection was 'designated' by the Museums, Libraries and Archives Council (MLA) as being of "national and international importance".

The museum is one of eight museums in the University of Cambridge Museums consortium.

== Department of History and Philosophy of Science ==
The museum forms part of the Department of History and Philosophy of Science, University of Cambridge. The department includes a working library with a large collection of early scientific books, some of which were given by Robert Whipple, chairman of the Cambridge Scientific Instrument Company. The museum plays an important part in the department's teaching and research.

== Collections ==
The museum's holdings are particularly strong in material dating from the 17th to the 19th centuries, especially objects produced by English instrument makers, although the collection contains objects dating from the medieval period to the present day. Instruments of astronomy, navigation, surveying, drawing and calculating are well represented, as are sundials, mathematical instruments and early electrical apparatus.

Since Robert Whipple's initial gift of the collection, the museum has come to house many instruments formerly used in the Colleges and Departments of the University of Cambridge.

== Opening hours ==
The Whipple Museum is open from Monday to Friday, 1 - 5pm, and Saturday 10am - 5pm.

== Gallery ==
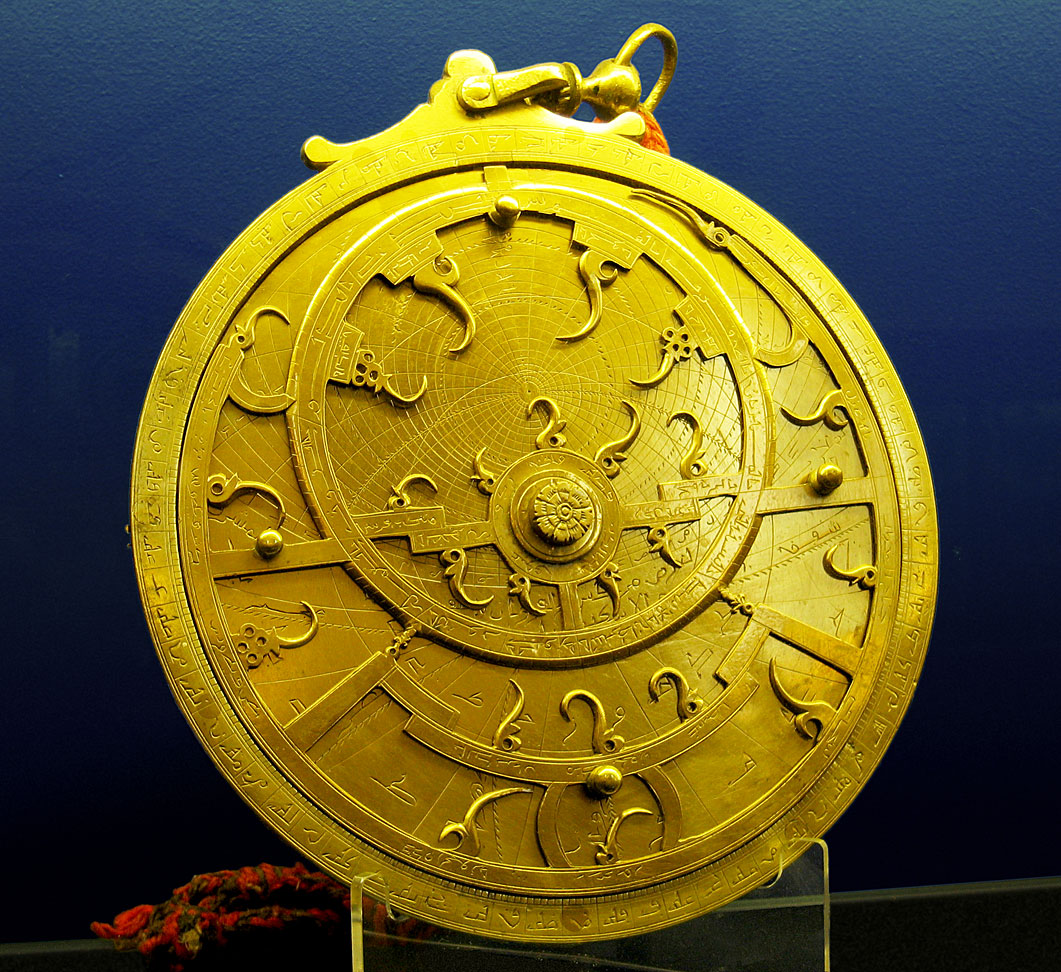
An 18th-century Persian astrolabe

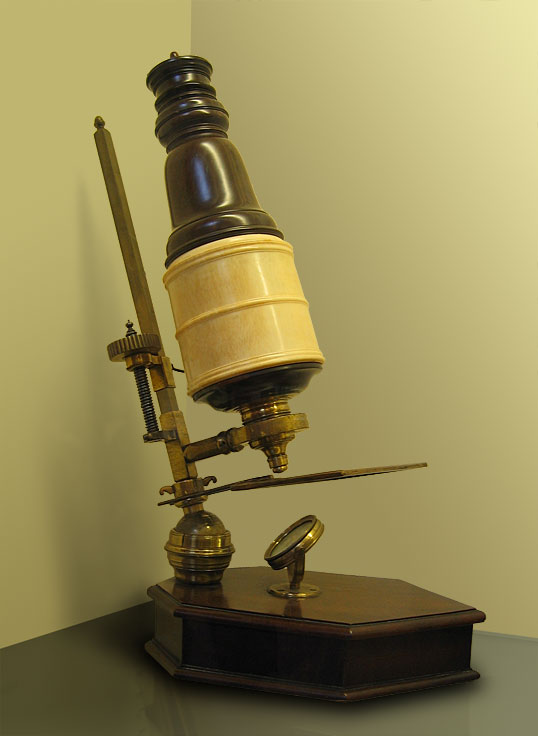
A 17th-century compound microscope

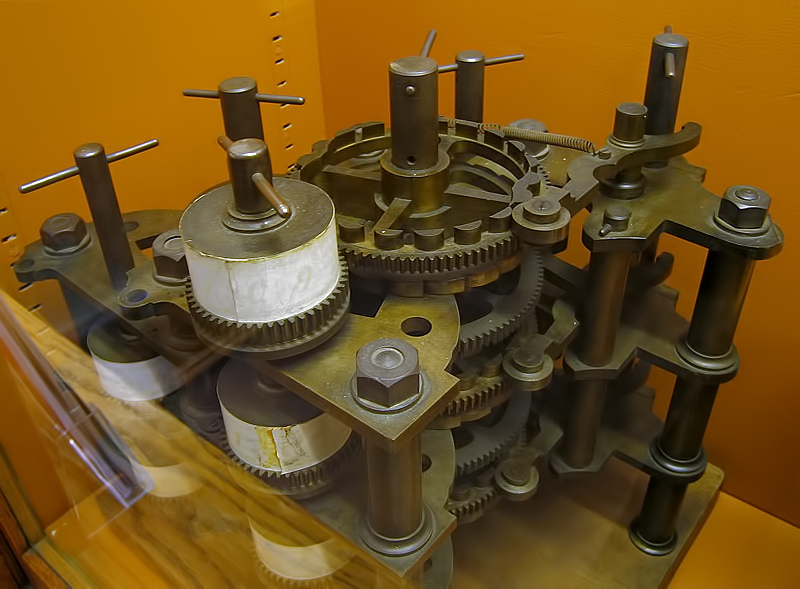
Partial assembly of Charles Babbage’s Difference Engine from original brass parts

== See also ==
- Jim Bennett, a previous curator, moved to the History of Science Museum, Oxford.
- History of science
