= Richard Rowe =

Richard Rowe may refer to:

- Richard Rowe (writer) (1828–1879), English author and journalist, also active in Australia
- Richard Rowe (horse racing) (born 1959), British horse jockey and trainer
- Richard Reynolds Rowe (1824–1899), English architect
- Richard Yates Rowe (1888–1973), American politician and businessman
- Dick Rowe (1921–1986), American talent scout for Decca Records
- Richard Rowe (priest) (XVth century), Archdeacon of Armagh
