= Wheeler Street, Cambridge =

Street in Cambridge, England

Coordinates: 52°12′16″N 0°07′09″E

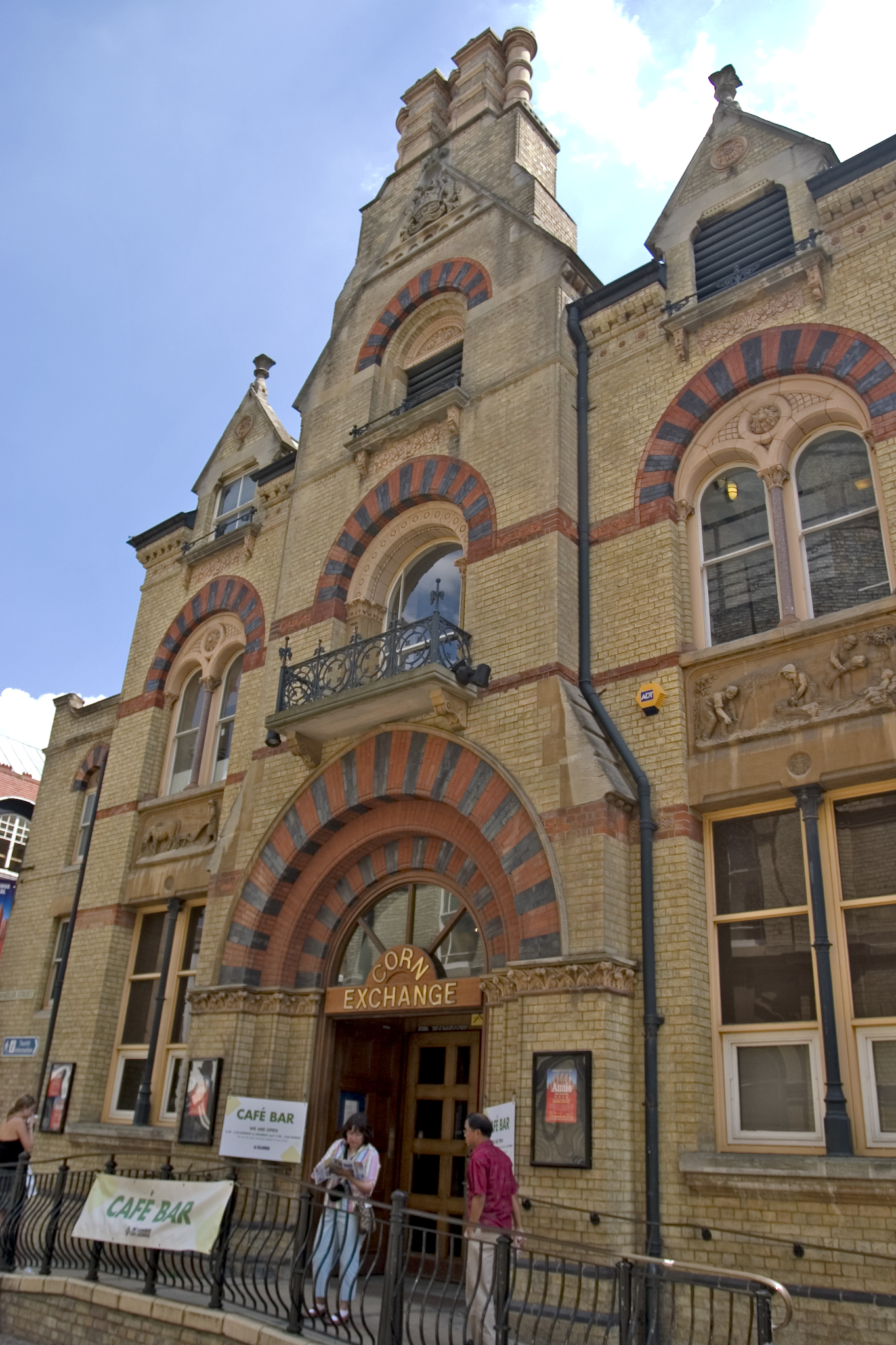
The Cambridge Corn Exchange on the corner of Wheeler Street and Corn Exchange Street.

Wheeler Street is a street in central Cambridge, England. It runs between Bene't Street to the southwest and Guildhall Street and Corn Exchange Street to the northeast. To the east, Guildhall Place, a cul-de-sac, runs southeast from the junction with Guildhall Street, parallel with Corn Exchange Street at its northwestern end, as an extension of Guildhall Street.

On the northeast end of Wheeler Street, on the corner with Corn Exchange Street is the Cambridge Corn Exchange, a music and theatrical venue. To the south is the New Museums Site, a site of the University of Cambridge with university museums, including the Whipple Museum of the History of Science on Free School Lane and the Cambridge University Museum of Zoology on Downing Street.

The Cambridge Guildhall and Market Square are to the north, reached via Peas Hill and Guildhall Street. The Lion Yard shopping centre is to the northeast.

The Cambridge Tourist Information Centre is located in Wheeler Street. The building dates from 1884 and was designed by the architect G. MacDonell. It was once the main city library, but this moved into Lion Yard in 1975. The building has a small but attractive domed reading room. Other buildings have been erected around this and the Guildhall, which means they are now partially hidden.

Wheeler Street gives its name to the song "Snowed in At Wheeler Street", the 2011 duet between Kate Bush and Sir Elton John.

== See also ==
- List of museums in Cambridge
