= Corn Exchange Street =

Road in Cambridge, England

Coordinates: 52.2038°N 0.1206°E

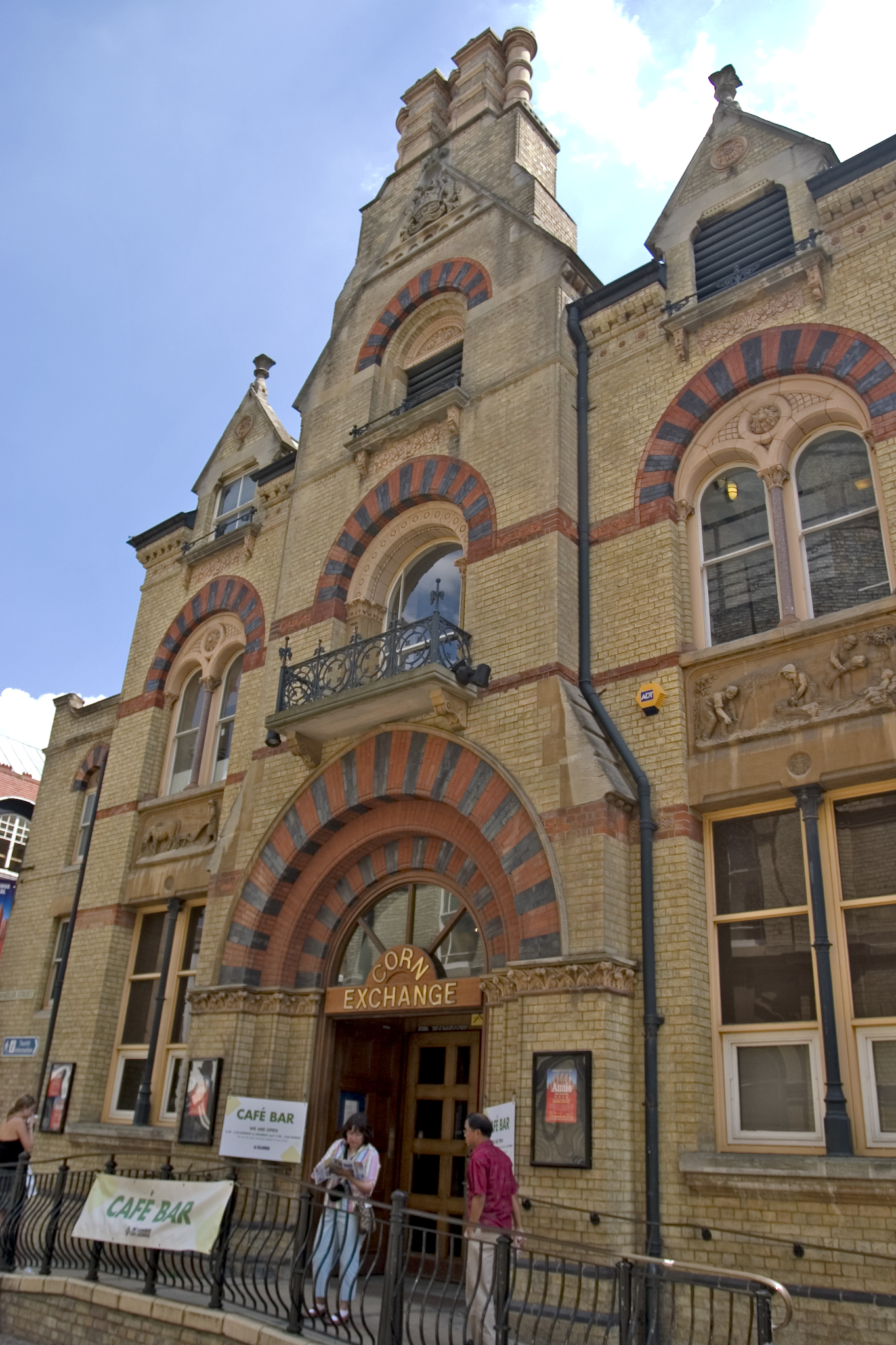
The Cambridge Corn Exchange on the corner of Wheeler Street and Corn Exchange Street.

Corn Exchange Street is a street in central Cambridge, England. It runs between Wheeler Street to the northwest and Downing Street to the southeast. To the northeast, Guildhall Place, a cul-de-sac, runs parallel with Corn Exchange Street at the northern end, an extension of Guildhall Street.

On the northwest corner of Corn Exchange Street is the Cambridge Corn Exchange, a music and theatrical venue. To the southwest is the New Museums Site, a site of the University of Cambridge with several museums, such as the Cambridge University Museum of Zoology near the corner with Downing Street.

The street acts as the main vehicle access and exit for a large multi-storey car park used by shoppers in central Cambridge.

== History ==
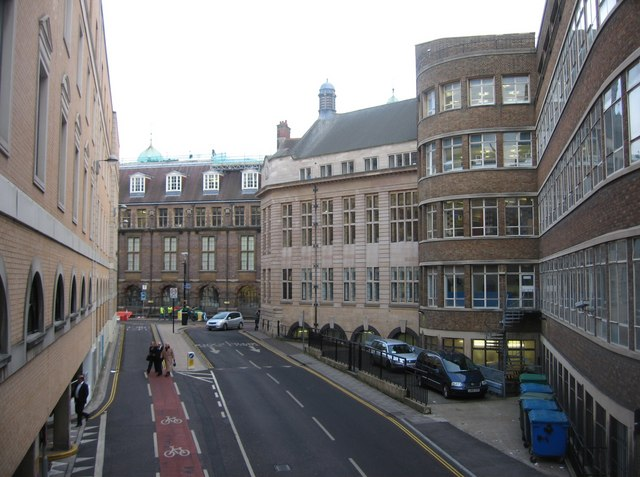
Corn Exchange Street, looking toward the Cambridge Medical School building

Roman pottery has been found in the area of Corn Market Street. Evidence for a number of ditches over the centuries and medieval settlement has been found on the northeast side of the street.

Corn Exchange Street has been a street since at least the 16th century when it was known as Slaughter Lane. The street straddles the line of the medieval King's Ditch. By 1574, the ditch was filled in at this location. On the far side of the ditch from the town centre, to the east of Slaughterhouse Lane was the Beast Market and a slaughteryard. To the west was a White Friars monastic house, straddling the ditch.

The Corn Exchange was built in the 19th century and the northeast side consisted of small shops and inns. In the 20th century, the character of the street was completely changed through the development of the Lion Yard shopping centre, the associated multi-storey car park, and a hotel.

== See also ==
- List of museums in Cambridge
