= Guildhall Street, Cambridge =

Street in Cambridge, England

Coordinates: 52°12′17″N 0°07′11″E

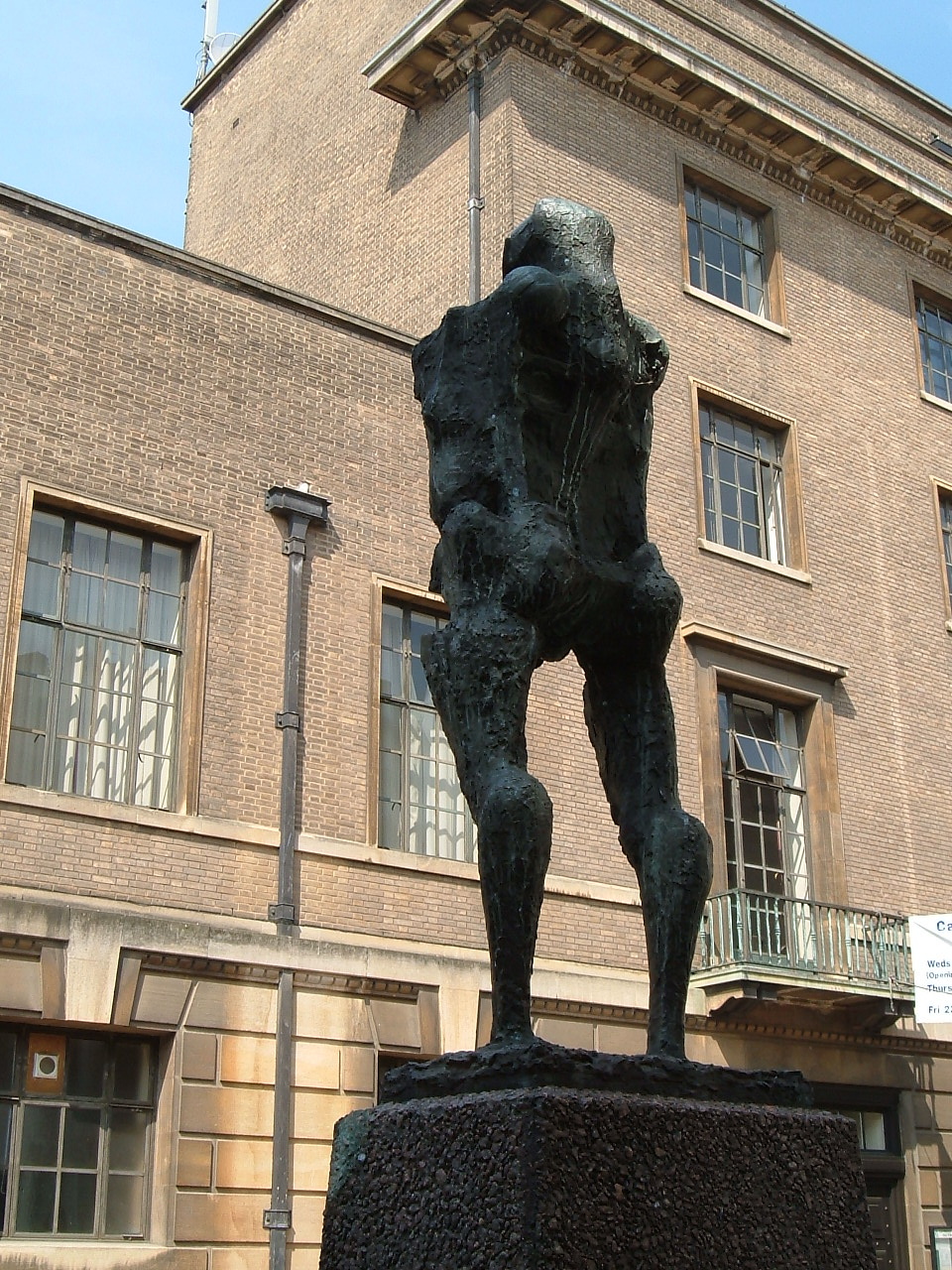
Talos, by Michael Ayrton, with the Cambridge Guildhall behind, in Guildhall Street.

Guildhall Street is a street in central Cambridge, England. To the north is the southeast corner of Market Hill at the junction with the pedestrianised shopping street Petty Cury. To the south it continues as Guildhall Place, a cul-de-sac, at the junction with Wheeler Street, close to the northern end of Corn Exchange Street.

To the west is the Cambridge Guildhall, hence the name of the street. To the east is the Lion Yard shopping centre. Fisher House in Guildhall Street is a Grade II listed late 16th / early 17th century timber-framed building that houses the Cambridge University Catholic Chaplaincy. The Red Cow public house is also Grade II listed, built in 1898 in a Jacobethan style. There is an outdoor sculpture, Talos, by Michael Ayrton in c. 1960, installed in Guildhall Street around 1973.

== History ==
Guildhall Street was originally the location of the meat market in Cambridge. The line of Guildhall Street as a street dates to at least the 16th century, when it was known as Butcher Row because of the meat market. Houses and stalls used to line the street, but these have changed radically, especially during the 20th century. The current building that forms the Guildhall dates mainly from the 1930s, although this site has been the centre for Cambridge's local government since the 14th century.

Guildhall Place to the south linked the yards and rows behind Petty Cury since at least the 19th century. Its position was changed when the Lion Yard shopping centre was built in 1975.
