= Cambridge Guildhall =

Municipal building in Cambridge, Cambridgeshire, England

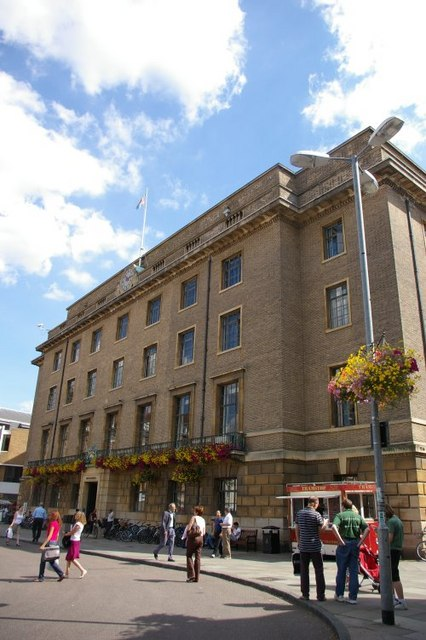

- Location within Cambridgeshire
- 52.2049°N 0.1192°E
- Location: Cambridge, Cambridgeshire

History
- Built: 1939

Site notes
- Architect: Charles Cowles-Voysey
- Architectural style: Neo-Georgian style

Listed Building – Grade II
- Designated: 2 August 1996
- Reference no.: 1268372

Cambridge Guildhall is a civic building in the centre of the historic city of Cambridge, England. It includes two halls, The Large Hall and The Small Hall, and is used for many disparate events such as comedy acts, conferences, craft fairs, live music, talks, and weddings. It is also used by the University of Cambridge for certain examinations. It is owned and managed by the Cambridge City Council, and it is their seat of government. The Guildhall is located on the south side of Market Hill, the market square in Cambridge, between Peas Hill to the west and Guildhall Street to the east. It is a Grade II listed building.

== History ==
The earliest known property on the site was a house, previously owned by a Jew known as Benjamin, which King Henry III granted to the town for use as a prison in 1224. An adjoining synagogue was leased to the Franciscans who later moved to a convent on a site where Sidney Sussex College now stands. In 1270 the premises became the "tolbooth" as it was known then since its main function concerned tolls for entry to the town and trading at the market. The tollbooth was also used for plays and the troupe of actors, Queen Elizabeth's Men, performed regularly between 1561 and 1562 and again between 1596 and 1597.

In 1747, a shire house, designed by Sharman and Barratt in the neoclassical style, was built, on arches with stalls beneath, on the open area at the front of the Market Square, just to the north of the old tollbooth.

Meanwhile, the old tollbooth was rebuilt to a design by James Essex at a cost of £2,500 in 1782. The shire house and the tollbooth were connected by a wooden bridge over Butter Row, a narrow market street with stalls selling dairy products. The two buildings operated collectively as "the guildhall" from the late 1840s. An assembly hall, with a reference library below, were added in 1862. An organ, designed and manufactured by William Hill & Son, was installed in the assembly hall in 1882.

After the old guildhall became inadequate for the council's needs, the current guildhall, which was designed by Charles Cowles-Voysey in the Neo-Georgian style, was built on the site of the two original buildings at a cost of £150,000 and completed in 1939. The assembly hall, and reference library below, were retained and built into the new structure.

The guildhall continued to be used as a public venue and concert performers included the contralto singer, Kathleen Ferrier, who made an appearance on 17 May 1951. A sculpture created by Michael Ayrton in 1950, entitled "Talos", was erected on Guildhall Street in 1973. The guildhall, which had served as the headquarters of the Municipal Borough of Cambridge, continued to be the local seat of government after the creation of Cambridge City Council in 1974. The guildhall was the venue for Crown Court hearings until a dedicated courthouse opened in East Road in June 2004.

The Duke and Duchess of Cambridge visited the guildhall and waved to the crowd from the balcony in November 2012.

In 2024, as part of the Civic Quarter project, various proposals were put forward regarding the future of the guildhall. Possible options include retaining the building, which would require undertaking a full restoration, or selling the building.

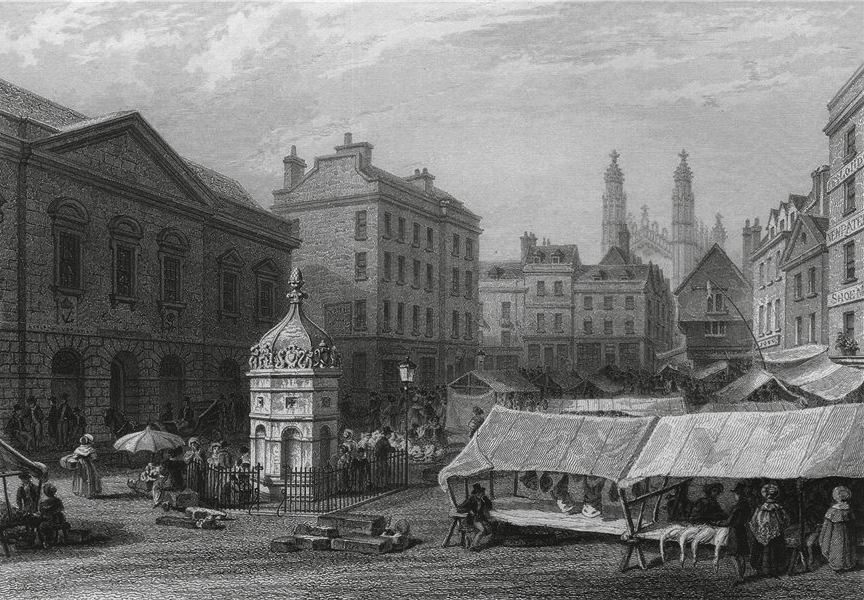
View of the 18th century shire house (on the left) in the Market Place in 1841

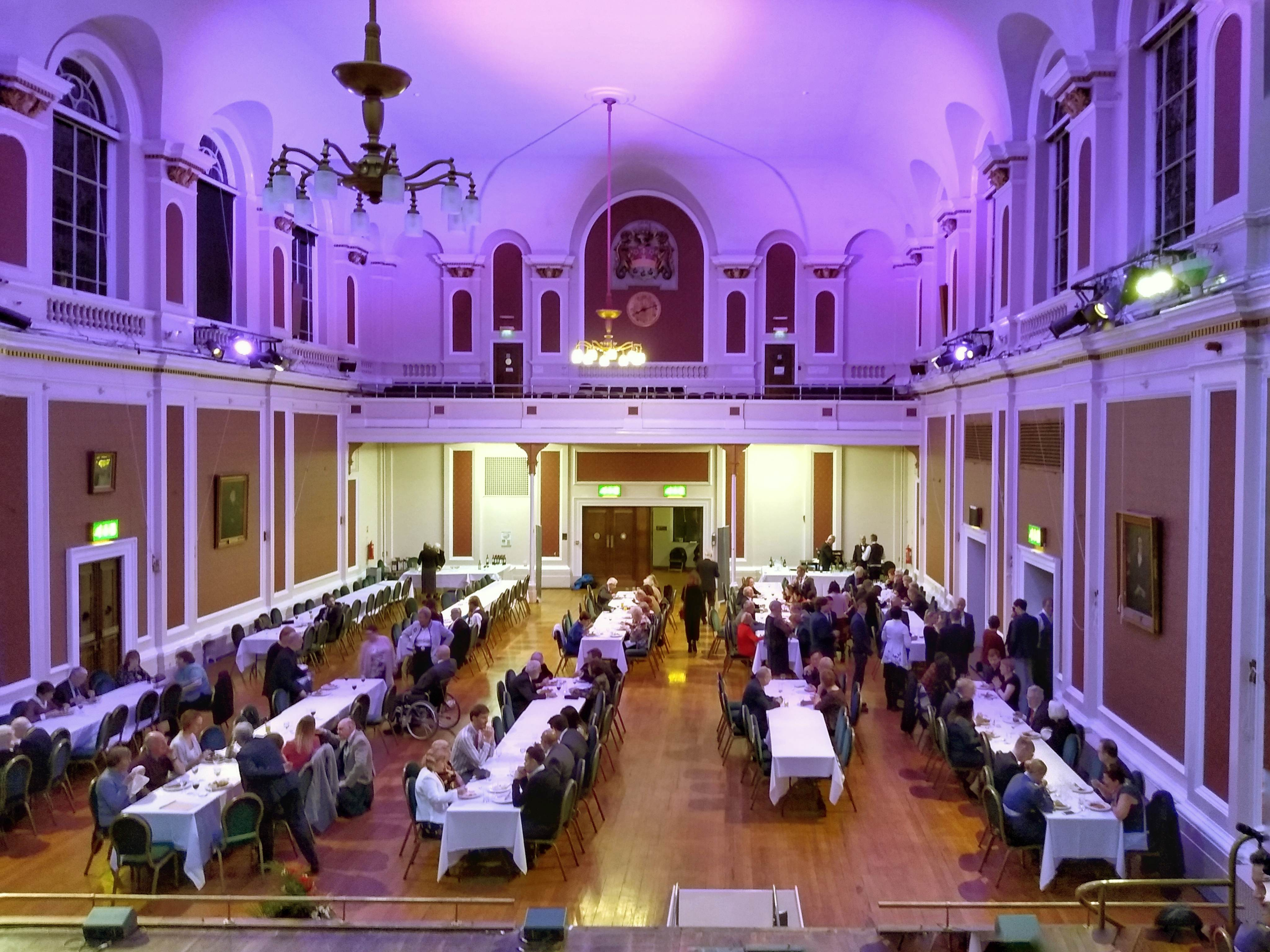
A dinner in the Large Hall of the Cambridge Guildhall viewed from its stage

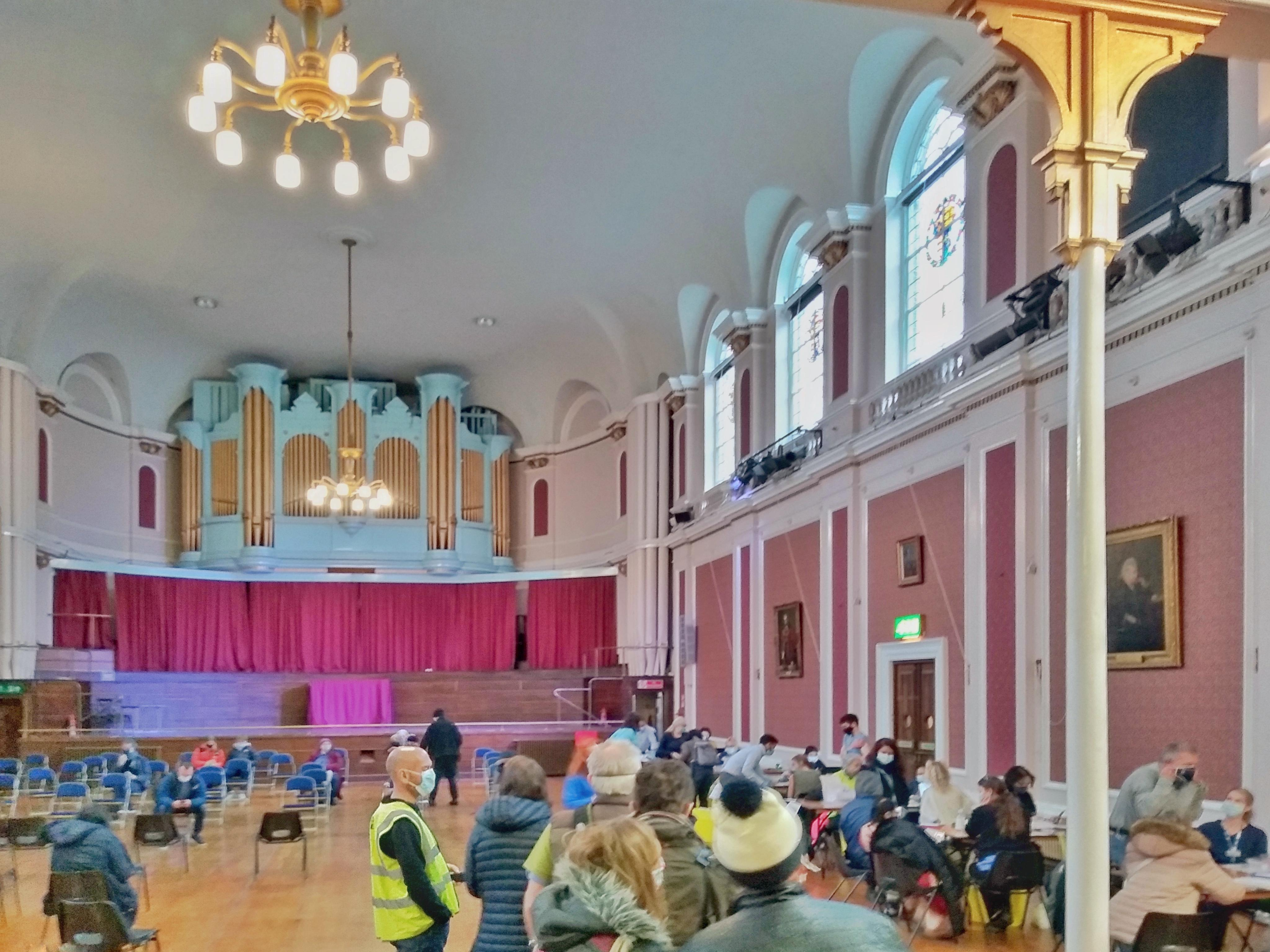
COVID-19 vaccination in the Large Hall of the Cambridge Guildhall viewed from its main entrance

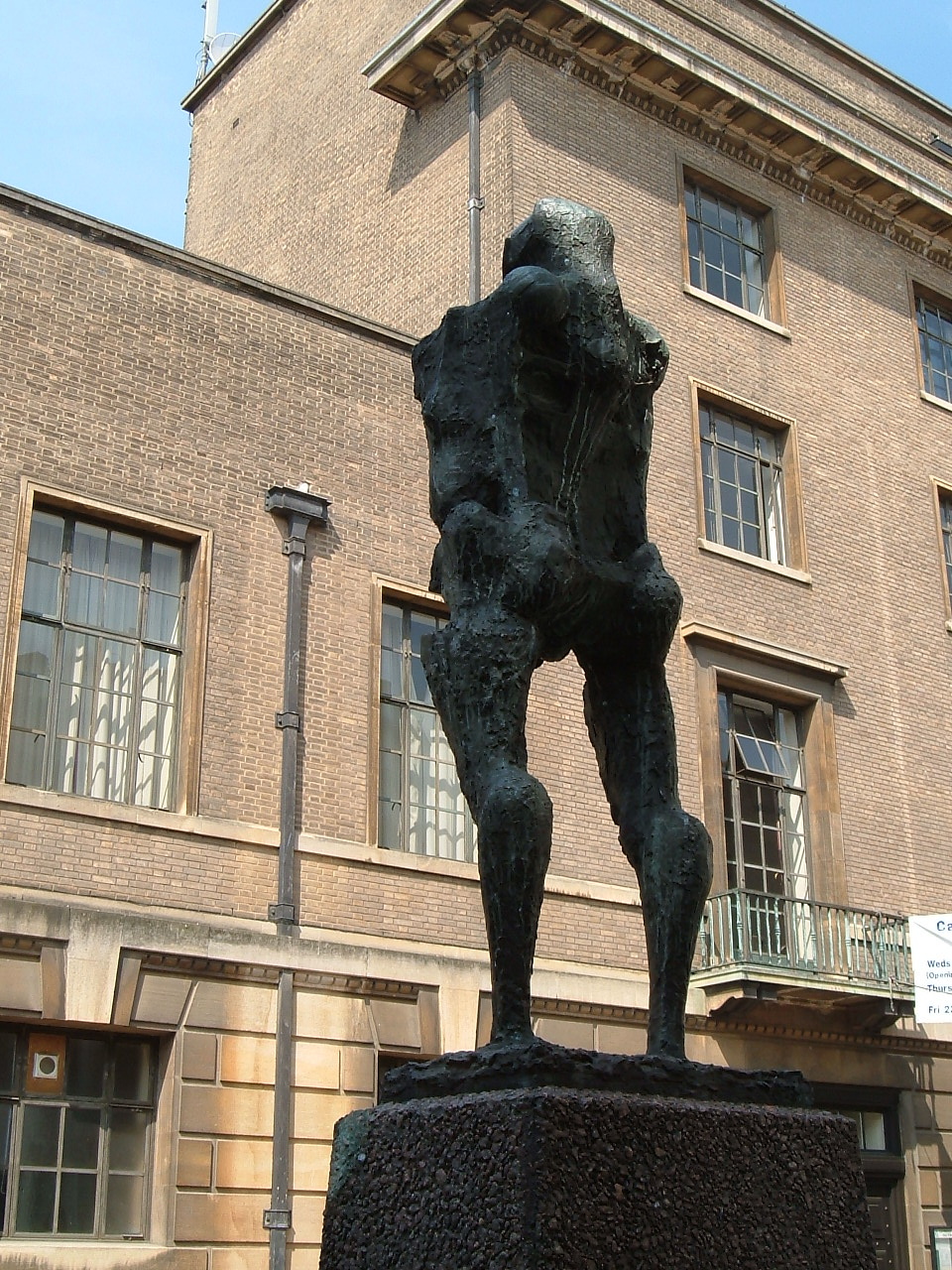
View of Cambridge Guildhall in Guildhall Street, with Talos, a sculpture by Michael Ayrton, in foreground in 2006

== See also ==
- Cambridge Corn Exchange in Wheeler Street
- Guild
- Guildhall Museum
- Worthing Town Hall, which influenced Cowles-Voysey's design for Cambridge Guildhall
