= St Andrew's Street =

St Andrew's Street or St Andrew Street may refer to:

- St Andrew's Street, Cambridge, England
- St Andrew's Street, Droitwich Spa, England
- St Andrew's Street, Newcastle upon Tyne, England
- St Andrew Street, Dunedin, New Zealand
