= Cambridge Medical School building =

Coordinates: 52°12′11.24″N 0°7′15.89″E

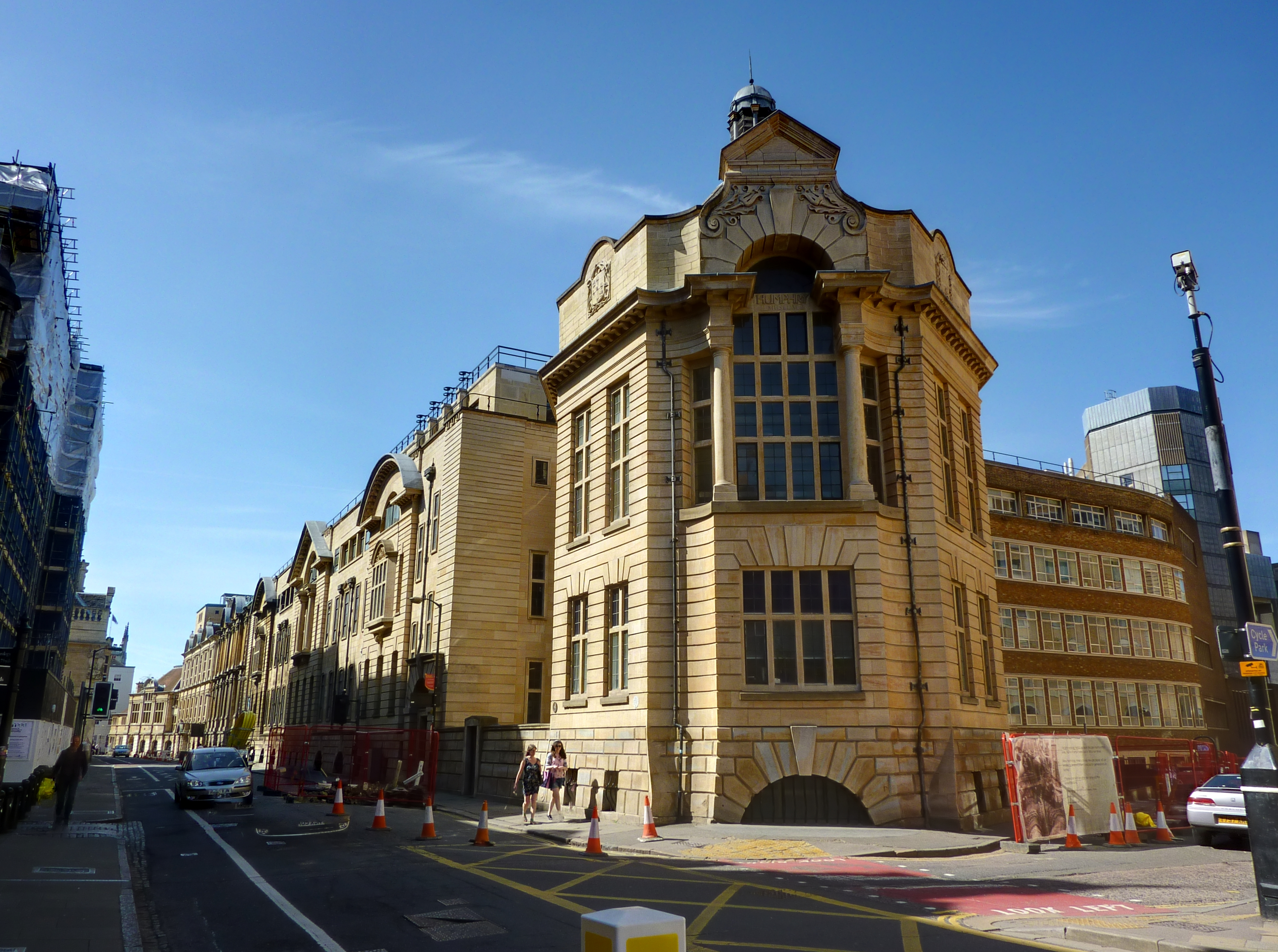
The Cambridge Medical School building seen from Downing Street

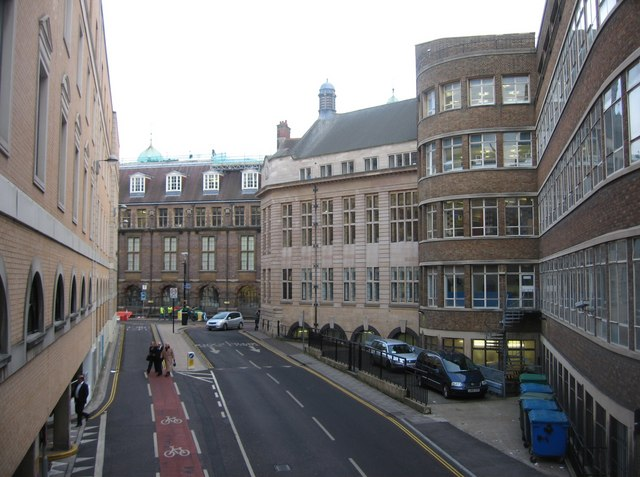
View from Corn Exchange Street

The building for the Cambridge Medical School of the University of Cambridge was designed in 1899 by Edward Schroeder Prior. Now the Zoological Laboratory, it is a Grade II listed building.

The Medical School building is Prior's largest work. Two of Prior's former clients, Dr Allbutt and the Rev. J. B. Lock, were on the committee that appointed the architect. Prior received an honorarium of only 100 guineas for the plans and elevations. He chose to adopt a classical idiom partly as a result of pressure from the committee.

The committee also influenced the design in other ways, such as insisting on a stone façade. In style, the building is based on English Baroque, heavily influenced by recent buildings by architects such as Belcher, Pite and Blomfield. It also reflects the presence of J. J. Stevenson's Chemical Laboratories (1886-8), immediately to the west of the site.

The Department of Zoology moved in 1933 into the redeveloped building. The architect was John Murray Easton. The former Humphry Museum was entirely reconstructed within, and today houses the Balfour and Newton Libraries.

== Classical design ==
Although best known for the original buildings of his maturity and for his writings on Gothic art, E. S. Prior produced a number of buildings in the classical tradition. To many architects of the Arts and Crafts Movement, 19th-century classicism had the advantage of continuing a long tradition of craftsmanship. Indeed Prior himself regarded classical styles as "built up on a substratum of craftsmanship which for two hundred years had practiced classic detail in the buildings of ordinary use." Classicism of the 19th century was "the passionate genuine expression of its age."

Many of Prior's domestic buildings had classical details, such as the Harrow Billiard Room. He also altered a number of 18th Century buildings, such as Downe Hall and High Grove. In 1895 he designed a cross for Sir Christopher Wren's chapel at Pembroke College and was impressed by "the genius of Wren."

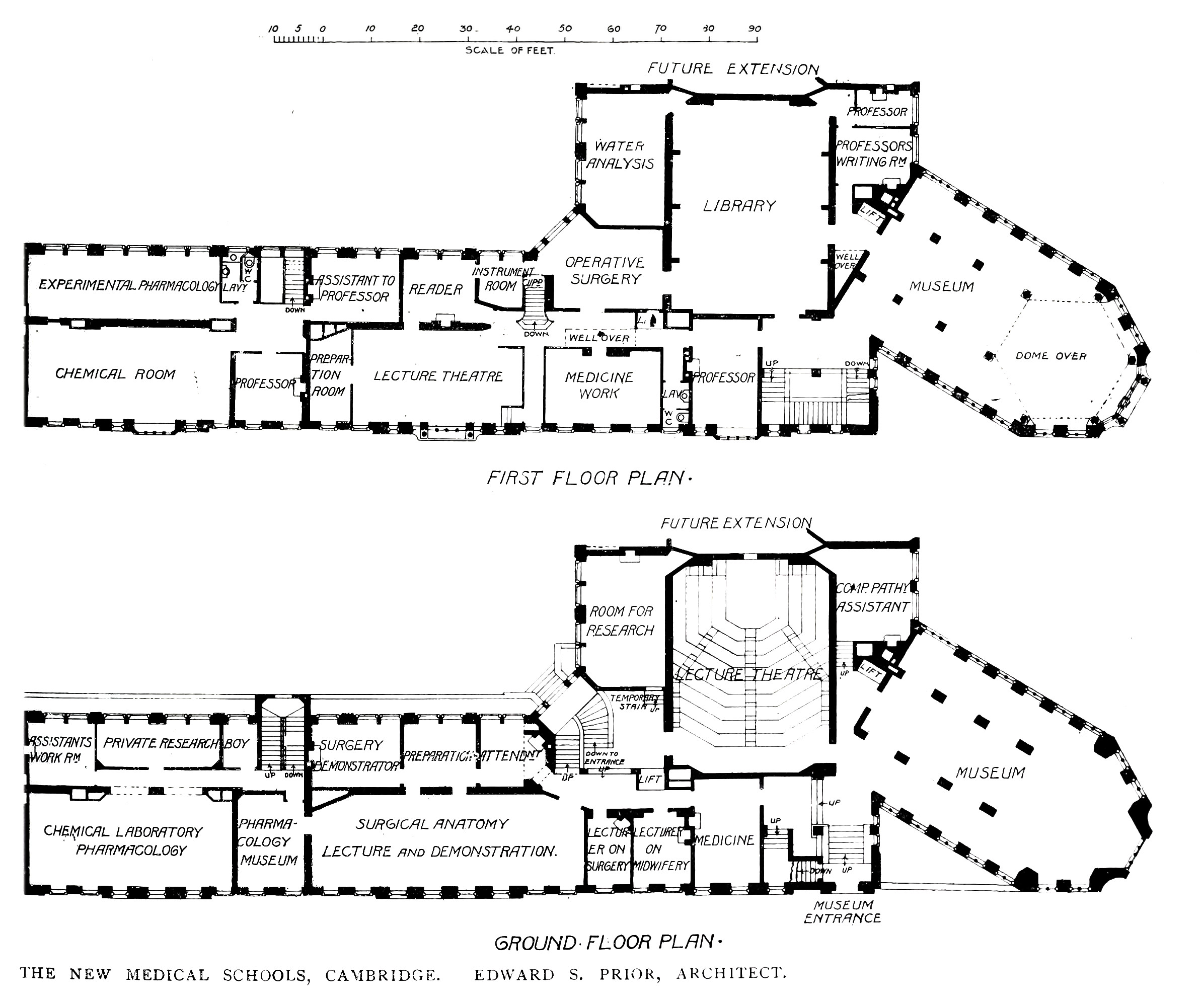
Plans of the building

== Exterior ==
The site is located on the corner of Downing Street and Corn Exchange Street. The building is basically L shaped in plan, with a long arm along Downing Street and the museum wing set at a skew. The Corn Exchange block widens from 42 feet (13 m) to 70 feet (21 m). The building was to be built in two phases, and the Corn Exchange block was not constructed until 1934.

The Downing Street elevation is three stories high, with three shallow bays with first-floor Oriel windows. The southeast and southwest bays have deep pediments, with the central bay having a triangular pediment. The basement forms a rusticated plinth, the front being battered and chamfered. The entrance is at the east end and is formed by a semi-circular arch with stepped windows above that light the stairwell. There are similar windows on the east elevation. There is a high parapet on the façade with the coat of arms of Professors George Murray Humphry and John Willis Clark. Lettering and a motto on the façade were cut by Eric Gill. The central gable is ornamented with carved lilies designed by Prior.

The rear elevation, again of three stories above a basement, had pairs of segmental headed separated by vertical panels of stone. It has now been built over.

== Interior ==
In layout, the building has axial corridors with research rooms, laboratories and offices on the ground floor and a large windowless lecture theatre. The first floor contained a barrel vaulted double height library and the Humphry Memorial Museum (in memory of the first Professor of Surgery, Sir George Murray Humphry). The museum was on two stories with a hexagonal dome resting on marble columns with distinct entasis. Further columns divided the space into nave and aisles.

Funds were raised by the University some 10 to 15 years after the death of Sir George to build the museum to commemorate his role in the development of modern surgery, post-operative care and hygiene.

== Materials ==
The columns were covered in glazed tiles by Conrad Dressler. The staircase is of Hopton Wood Stone with curved angles to the treads to minimise the collection of dirt and ease cleaning. Prior designed the integrated oak banisters, balusters and railings. Throughout the building every detail was designed to minimise potential sources of infection and dirt collection; for example, the doors and fittings have no mouldings.

The Downing Street front is of Ancaster stone with rusticated Derbyshire stone dressings. The northern rear elevation is in brick with stone dressings. The floors are of jointless cement, and the roof is supported by a rolled steel joist system. Prior paid great attention to the roof design to minimize potential dirt traps, ensuring that not even a rivet projected as a potential collecting area.

== Utilities ==
The building incorporated a plenum system of heating and ventilation. The air was washed, cleaned, screened and warmed before being distributed by fans along ducts and flues within the walls of the building. Lighting and power were supplied via diesel generators. The lighting and drainage systems were also sophisticated. For example, glazed waste pipes with removable covers enabled flushing in the laboratories.

Prior designed the rolling stack book-shelving of the library, all the laboratory furniture, doors and fittings, and so on.
