= Richard Reynolds Rowe =

English architect and civil engineer

- Born: 5 June 1824
- Died: 21 December 1899 (aged 75)
- Occupation: Architect
- Buildings: Cambridge Corn Exchange

Richard Reynolds Rowe FRIBA FSA KStJ (5 June 1824 – 21 December 1899) was an English architect and civil engineer, mainly active in Cambridge and Cambridgeshire. His best-known work is the Cambridge Corn Exchange.

== Biography ==
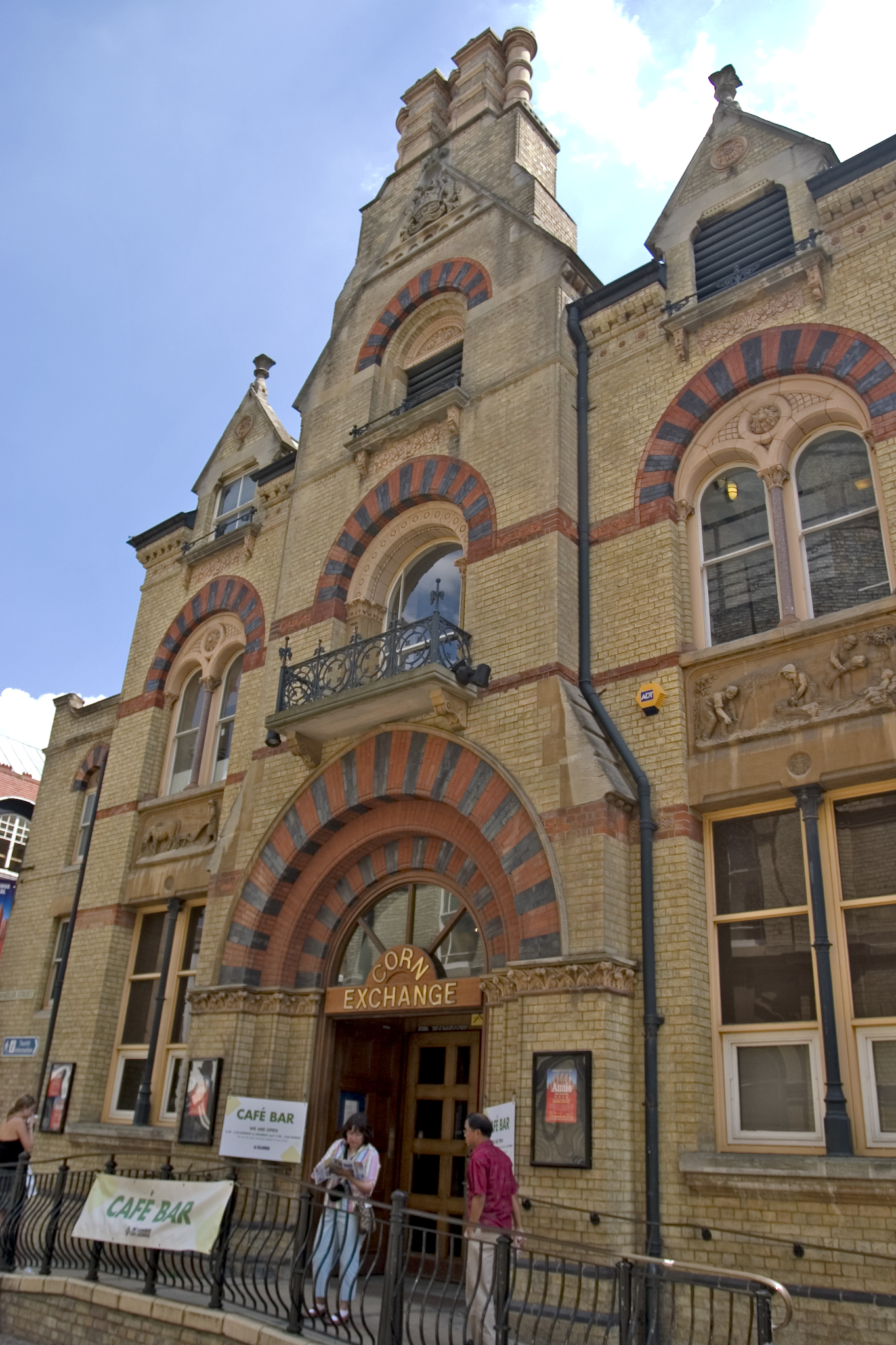
Cambridge Corn Exchange

Richard Reynolds Rowe was born in 1824, the son of Richard Rowe, a Cambridge alderman. He attended school at Eaton-Socon, and then either school or university in Cambridge. In his early career he worked mainly as a civil engineer. His first position was on the Isle of Man, as clerk of works for St Thomas's Church, Douglas (1847). He next worked on water supply and drainage projects in Essex.

In 1850 he set up practice in Cambridge as an architect, from 1893 in partnership with C. R. Scott, and designed and built several buildings around Cambridge and elsewhere in Cambridgeshire. He was the borough surveyor in 1850–69, and also served as the architect attached to the Cambridgeshire and Isle of Ely Asylum at Fulbourn and the clerk of works for Ely Cathedral. He was an elected fellow of the Royal Institute of British Architects, the Society of Antiquaries and the Surveyors' Institution, a member of the Institute of Civil Engineers (1859), and served as president of the Institute of Sanitary Engineers. His other honours include being a Knight of Justice of the Order of St John of Jerusalem.

Rowe was married. With William John Beamont, he was associated with the foundation of the Church Congress in 1861. In later life, he lived at Parkside in Cambridge. He died on 21 December 1899. His funeral was held at St Andrew the Great and he was buried at Mill Road Cemetery.

== Works ==
His most-notable work in Cambridge is the Cambridge Corn Exchange (1873–75). His other buildings in the town include St Matthew's Church (1864–66), number 6, Trumpington Road (1866), Wilton Terrace, Station Road, almshouses on King Street (1880), and (with C. R. Scott) the Red Cow pub on Corn Exchange Street (1898).

Outside Cambridge, he built Anglican churches at Burwell (1863), Prickwillow (1866–68) and Wendy (1866; demolished in around 1950), and was involved in restoring many Anglican churches in Cambridgeshire, including those at Stuntney (1875–76) and Haddenham (1871–77). He also built vicarages or rectories at Graveley (1853–54), Fulbourn (1859) and Chatteris (1878–80).

His non-ecclesiastical work in Cambridgeshire includes the police station (1855) at Linton and Arkenstall's Endowed School at Haddenham (1863).
