= Robert Sayle =

Former department store in England

Coordinates: 52.20422°N 0.12266°E

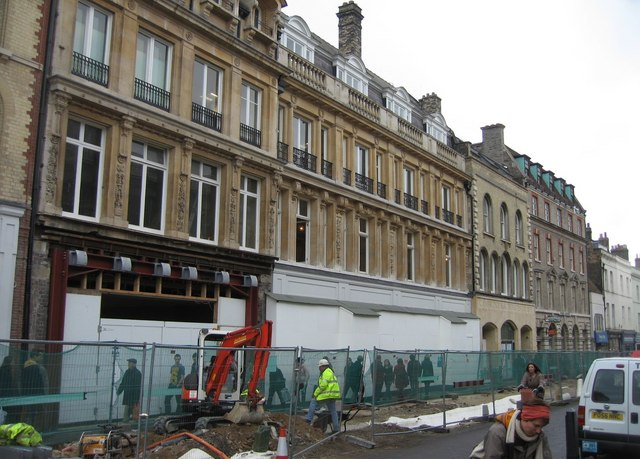
The former Robert Sayle building being modified to create the Grand Arcade

Robert Sayle was a department store in Cambridge, England, founded by Robert Sayle (1816–1883). In 1934, it was purchased by Selfridges, who sold it to the John Lewis Partnership in 1939. In 2007, it reopened as a John Lewis store.

== History ==
Robert Sayle was born in Southery, Norfolk, in 1816. His father was a farmer. Sayle moved to London to learn the drapery trade with well known firms, such as Hitchcock, Williams & Co, who were based near St Paul's Cathedral.

In 1840, Sayle returned to Cambridge. With assistance from his father, he set up a drapery business in Victoria House in St Andrew's Street. The business sold Irish linens, sheeting, hosiery, haberdashery, furs, shawls, handkerchiefs, ribbons and fancy goods. It was cutting edge for its time, as plate-glass windows had been added to the store front to display the shop's goods.

The business continued to grow purchasing the shops along St Andrew's Street and by 1888 the store had grown up to no. 17. Sayle died of a heart attack in 1883, and the business continued to be run as a private business by partners, Joseph Clark, Arthur Edward Chaplin and Hugh Porter who greatly expanded the departments.

In 1934, Selfridges purchased the business. Five years later Selfridges sold off its provincial stores and Robert Sayle was bought by the John Lewis Partnership. They also acquired Thompsons of Peterborough from Selfridges, which was rebranded under the Robert Sayle name in 1941. The Peterborough store was destroyed by fire in 1956 and not reopened.

The Cambridge store continued to trade at St Andrew's Street under the Robert Sayle name until 2004, when it moved to a temporary location in Burleigh Street. This was to facilitate the demolition of the St Andrew's Street store to make way for the Grand Arcade shopping centre. The St Andrew's Street facade of the original Robert Sayle building was retained as part of the redevelopment. The Grand Arcade opened in November 2007, with the anchor store being the new John Lewis Cambridge. The partners at Robert Sayle voted to drop the old name and start afresh with the John Lewis name.

Robert Sayle's youngest son, Charles Edward Sayle, was a poet, literary scholar and librarian.
