= Grafton Centre =

Shopping centre in Cambridge

Coordinates: 52.2068°N 0.1341°E

The Grafton

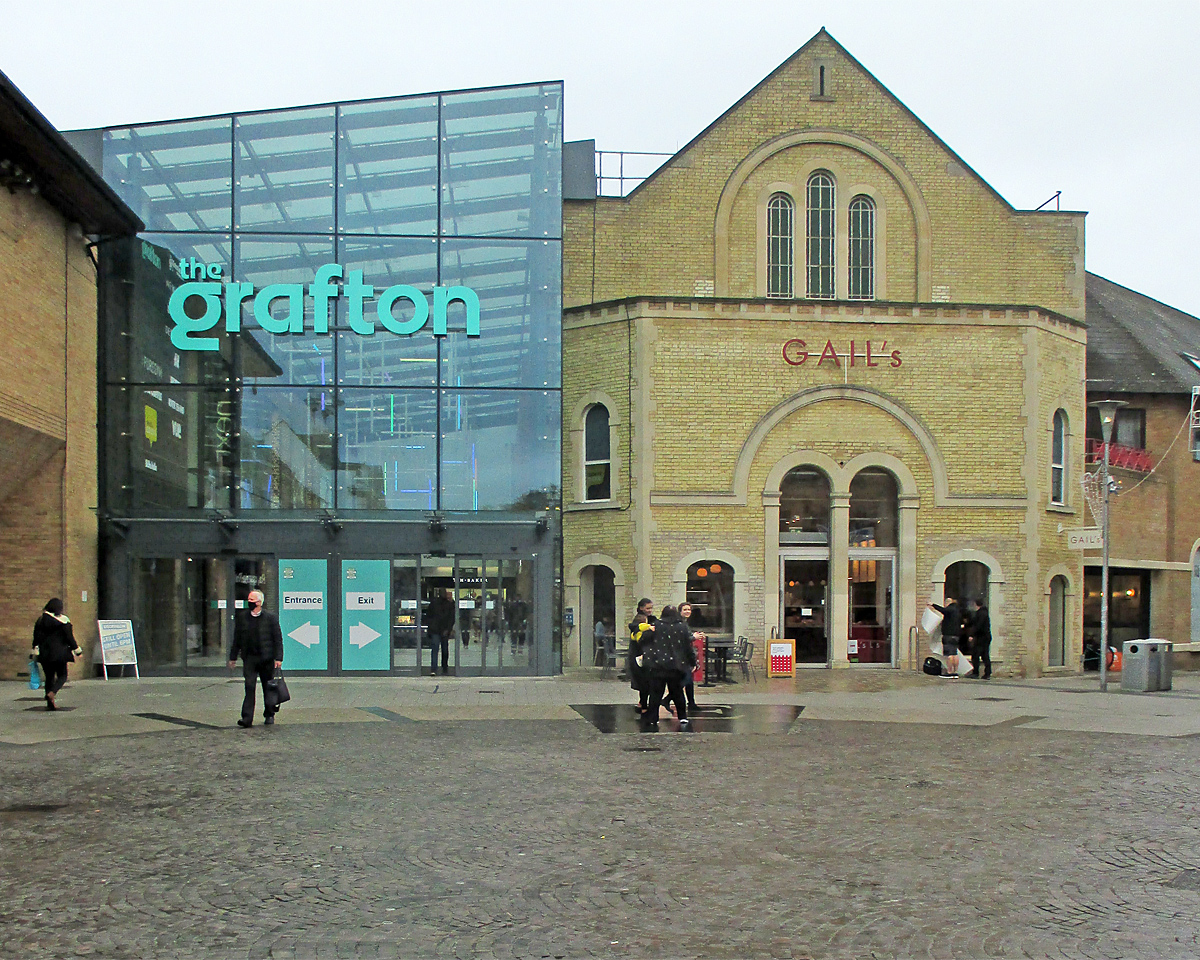
- The Fitzroy Street entrance to the Grafton Centre 2021

The Grafton centre is a covered shopping centre in the east of central Cambridge, England. It is one of the three main shopping centres in Cambridge, with Lion Yard and Grand Arcade in the city's centre.

The Centre dominates Fitzroy Street and Burleigh Street. The main footprint is linear, running from east to west. It has three atria, the eastern one being the largest. The mall is laid out across two storeys with some of the shops having more than one storey.

Currently more than thirty years old, the Grafton Centre underwent a £30m refurbishment programme in 2017 after being bought by Legal & General for £99m. It has since been sold to Trinity Investment Management for £61.4m.

The main retail stores include Boots and Next. Until its closure in 2021, Debenhams was the largest store in the centre. It also has its own five-bay bus stop, a food court and two multi-storey car parks, with capacity for 1100 vehicles.

Unusually for a shopping centre of its type, the site includes a number of council flats at its western and northern edges.

== History ==
Initial plans for a shopping centre on the site of the Grafton date to the 1950 Holford-Wright Report on the planning of Cambridge.

In 1973, plans by architects Richard Rogers and Renzo Piano, later famed for their Pompidou Centre in Paris, were approved by the city council. They were later rejected due to budgetary concerns.

Grosvenor Developments took on development from 1978, constructing the Grafton through the early 1980s. It was opened by Queen Elizabeth II in 1984.

During the preceding decade, plans for the development of this approximately "kite"-shaped area of land (at that time dominated by terraced houses dating from the tail end of the previous century, and extensively used for student lodgings) were met with controversy and opposition. During a decade dominated by national indebtedness and economic decline, with investment funds in short supply, progress towards commencement of the development was slow.

In 2016 the centre was bought by Legal & General for £99m. In 2017 a £28.5m refurbishment programme was conducted. The refurbishment largely failed to attract more business, with issues compounded by the COVID-19 pandemic, and the site was put on sale in 2021.

In August 2022, Trinity Investment Management, backed by Angelo Gordon, completed the acquisition of The Grafton shopping centre from Legal & General's LGIM Real Assets for £61.4 million, representing a 50% loss of value in 5 years. Proposed uses for the site include redevelopment for life sciences laboratories.
