= Grand Arcade (Cambridge) =

Shopping centre in Cambridge

Coordinates: 52.204°N 0.122°E

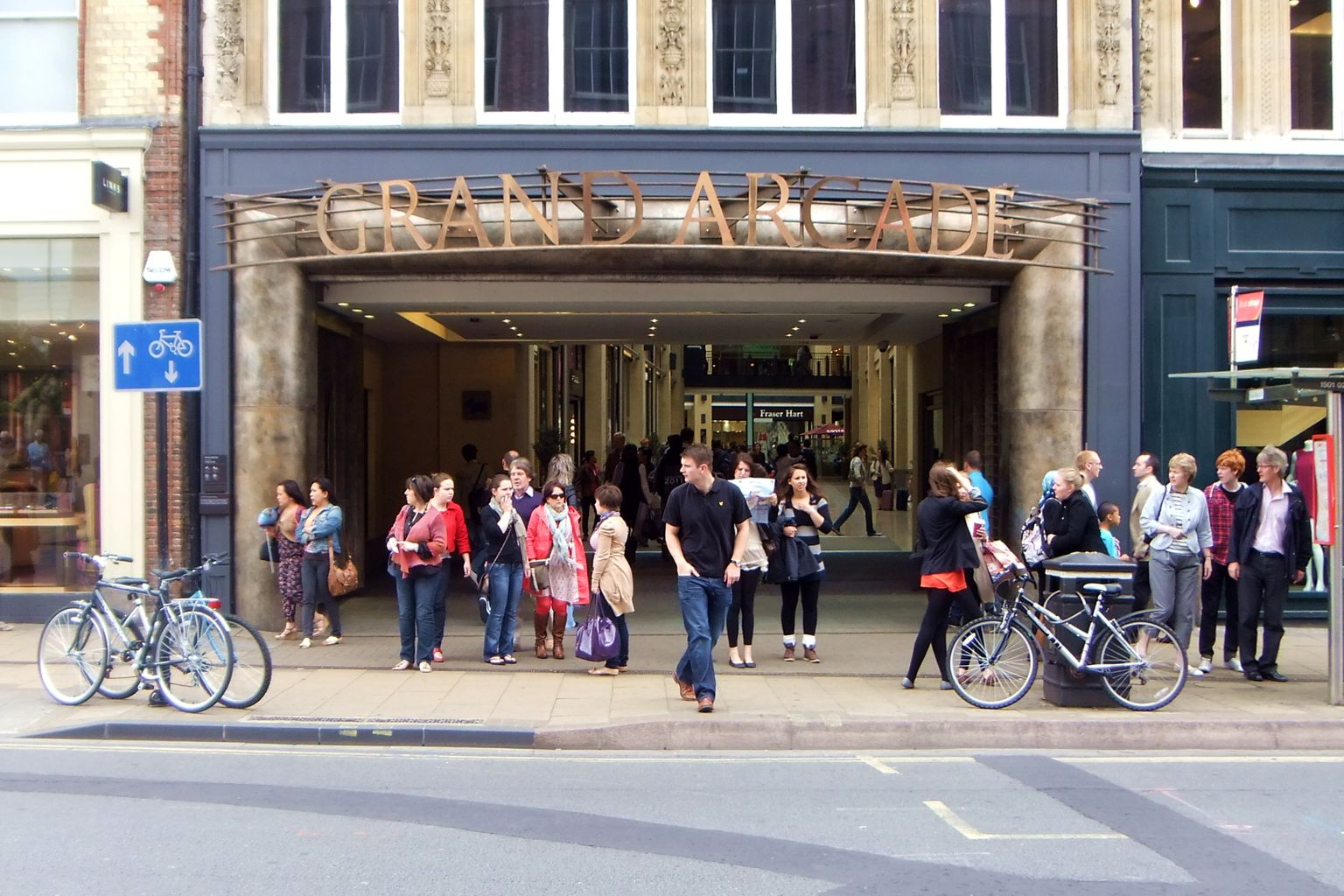
- The Grand Arcade entrance on St Andrew's Street, Cambridge.
- Location: St Andrew's Street, Cambridge
- Website: https://www.grandarcade.co.uk

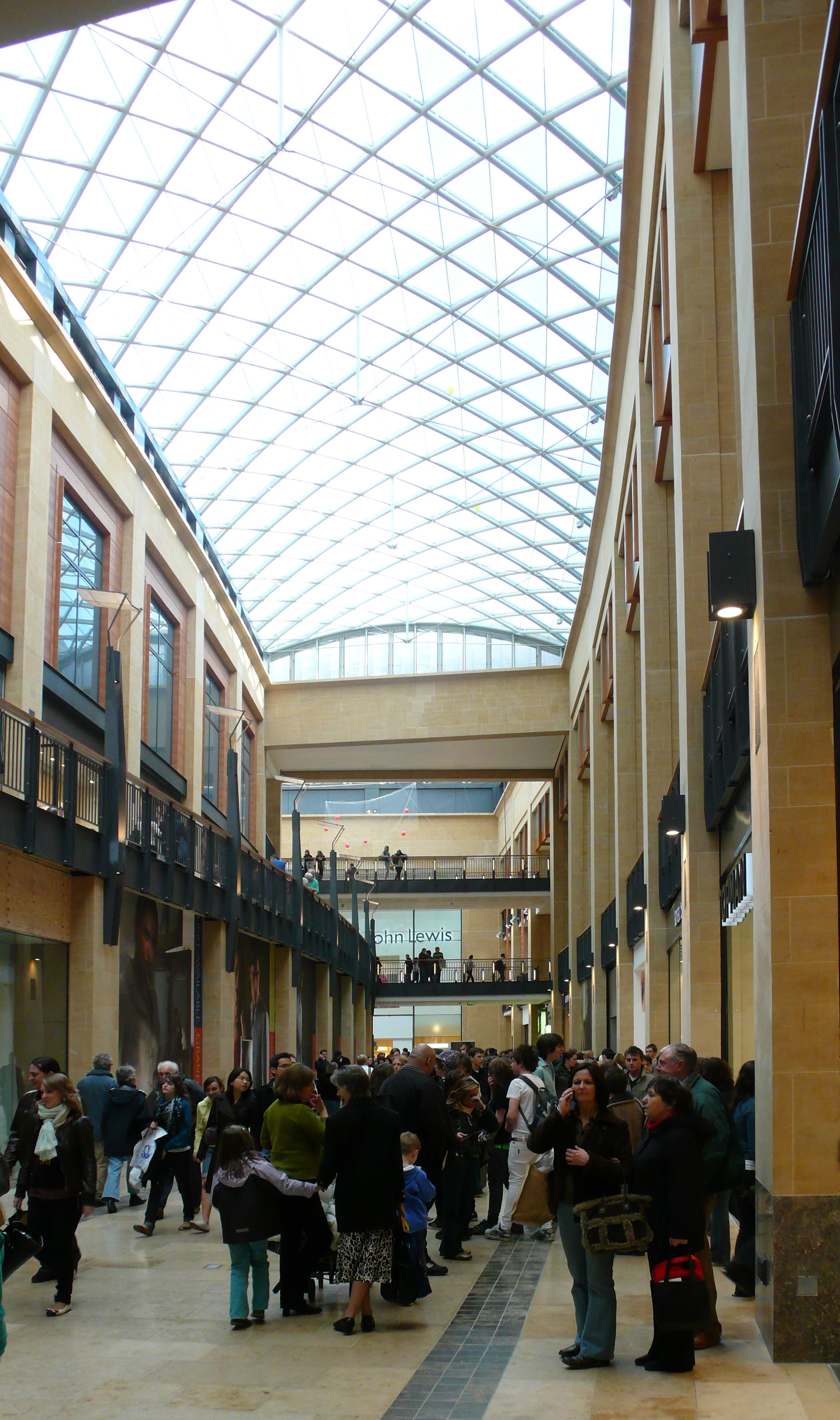
The Grand Arcade on its opening day.

The Grand Arcade is a large shopping centre in St Andrew's Street, Cambridge, England. It is anchored by the John Lewis & Partners department store, (formerly Robert Sayle) which is situated to the southeast of the site and which re-opened, following a major rebuild, on 8 November 2007, prior to the rest of the development, which opened on 27 March 2008.

It links to the existing Lion Yard shopping centre, the car park of which was demolished and replaced as part of the overall scheme, and renamed on local signage. The city's other major undercover shopping mall, the Grafton, is a ten-minute walk away.

The Grand Arcade Cycle Park is the first such dedicated cycle park connected to a shopping centre in the UK. It is set to offer over 500 cycle parking spaces and a cycle shop. Controversially, this was necessary because of the removal of cycle parking on the street in the centre of Cambridge.

Besides John Lewis & Partners, there are over 60 other outlets: shops, cafés and restaurants. A full list can be found at the Grand Arcade website.

It also houses the new Cambridge Magistrates' Court.
