= List of museums in Cambridgeshire =

This list of museums in Cambridgeshire, England contains museums which are defined for this context as institutions (including nonprofit organizations, government entities, and private businesses) that collect and care for objects of cultural, artistic, scientific, or historical interest and make their collections or related exhibits available for public viewing. Also included are non-profit art galleries and university art galleries. Museums that exist only in cyberspace (i.e., virtual museums) are not included.

== Museums ==
Name	Image	Town/City	Type	Summary
Anglesey Abbey, Gardens and Lode Mill		Lode	Historic house	Operated by the National Trust, 1930s period house featuring a collection of rare clocks, gardens, and working flour mill
Blacked-Out Britain War Museum		Huntingdon	History	information, everyday life in Britain during World War II
Bourn Windmll		Bourn	Mill	open trestle post mill
Burghley House		Peterborough	Historic house	Grand 16th-century country house with gardens, collections of fine and decorative arts
Burwell Museum		Burwell	History	Themed building exhibits include agriculture, period rooms and household items, military life, blacksmith's shop, a Roman pottery, a Victorian school room, vintage vehicles, carts, farm equipment
Cambridge Museum of Technology		Cambridge	Technology	Located in an original sewage pumping station, includes equipment, information and artefacts from local industries
Cambridge Science Centre		Cambridge	Science	Hands-on science exhibitions, workshops, shows and talks
Cambridge University Library		Cambridge	Library	Changing exhibits of art, history and culture from its collections, part of the University of Cambridge
Cambridge University Museum of Zoology		Cambridge	Natural history	Specimens of fossil and living animals, part of the University of Cambridge
Centre for Computing History		Cambridge	Computer	Technology and the social, cultural and historical impact of the computing revolution
Chatteris Museum		Chatteris	Local	local history, culture
Cromwell Museum		Huntingdon	Biographical	Life of 17th century English military and political leader Oliver Cromwell
Farmland Museum and Denny Abbey		Waterbeach	Multiple	Agriculture, local history, and historic abbey dating to the 12th century
Elton Hall		Elton	Historic house	Baronial hall and gardens on a 3,800-acre (15 km2) estate
Ely Museum		Ely	Local	area history, culture, natural history, located in the Bishop's gaol
Fitzwilliam Museum		Cambridge	Art	Includes fine art, coins, Egyptian collections, antiquities, Near-Eastern and Asian art and artefacts, decorative art, part of the University of Cambridge
Flag Fen Bronze Age Centre and Archaeology Park		Peterborough	Archaeology	Open air reconstruction and finds from a Bronze Age settlement
Hinchingbrooke House		Huntingdon	Historic house	Tudor country house, ancestral home of the Cromwell and Sandwich families
Houghton Mill		Houghton	Mill	Operated by the National Trust, restored water mill
Imperial War Museum Duxford		Duxford	Aviation	Military aircraft, military vehicles, artillery and minor naval vessels
Kettle's Yard		Cambridge	Art	Gallery of 20th century and 21st century art, part of the University of Cambridge
Kimbolton Castle		Kimbolton	Historic house	Final home of King Henry VIII's first queen, Catherine of Aragon, open for tours on a very limited basis
Lawrence Room		Cambridge	Archaeology	artefacts of Anglo-Saxon, Egyptian and Classical Mediterranean origin, at Girton College, Cambridge, part of the University of Cambridge
Longthorpe Tower		Longthorpe	Historic house	14th century, three-story tower featuring mediæval wall paintings
The Manor (Cambridgeshire)		Hemingford Grey	Historic house	One of the oldest continuously inhabited houses in Britain, made famous as the house of Green Knowe by Lucy Boston
March and District Museum		March	Local	Local history, culture
Museum of Archaeology and Anthropology		Cambridge	Multiple	Archaeology and anthropology artefacts from England, Ancient Rome, Africa, the Pacific, and great works of African, Asian, and native American sculpture, part of the University of Cambridge
Museum of Cambridge		Cambridge	Local	Local history and culture, period room displays, artefacts of everyday life, formerly the Cambridge and County Folk Museum
Museum of Classical Archaeology		Cambridge	Art	Plaster casts of Greek & Roman sculpture, part of the University of Cambridge
New Hall Art Collection		Cambridge	Art	Works by women artists, part of Murray Edwards College, a women's college of University of Cambridge
Norris Museum, Cambridgeshire		St Ives	Local	local history, culture
Octavia Hill's Birthplace House		Wisbech	Biographical	home of 19th century British social reformer Octavia Hill, co-founder of the National Trust
Oliver Cromwell's House		Ely	Biographical	home of Oliver Cromwell, also tourist office.
Peckover House & Garden		Wisbech	Historic house	Operated by the National Trust, Georgian merchant's townhouse with Victorian walled garden
People's Portraits Exhibition		Cambridge	Art	long term exhibition of portraits of ordinary people from all walks of life created by the Royal Society of Portrait Painters, at Girton College, Cambridge, part of the University of Cambridge
Peterborough Museum		Peterborough	Multiple	Local history, art, archaeology, natural history, Jurassic fossils
Prickwillow Museum		Prickwillow	Technology	History of the changing landscape of the Fens and the principles of drainage which created it, features restored diesel engines in a former pumping station
Railworld		Peterborough	Railway	Sustainable transport, model trains, railway locomotives, memorabilia
Ramsey Rural Museum CIO		Ramsey	History	history of rural Fenland life, period rooms and businesses, agriculture, trades
Rupert Brooke Museum		Grantchester	Biographical	life and works of poet Rupert Brooke, located adjacent to The Orchard tea garden
Ruskin Gallery		Cambridge	Art	Part of Anglia Ruskin University
The Polar Museum		Cambridge	Science	Part of the University of Cambridge, history and science of explorations of the Arctic and Antarctic
Sedgwick Museum of Earth Sciences		Cambridge	Natural history	Geology, rocks, minerals, fossils, part of the University of Cambridge
St Neots Museum		St Neots	Local	Local history, culture, prison cells
Stained Glass Museum		Ely	Art	Historic and contemporary stained glass, located in Ely Cathedral
Stretham Old Engine		Stretham	Technology	Working steam engine
Taggart Gallery and Museum		Great Staughton	Art	Shop with museum featuring historic decorative tiles
Thorney Heritage Museum		Thorney	Local	local history, culture
Tower Museum Bassingbourn		Royston	Military	History of RAF Bassingbourn during World War II
Waterbeach Military Heritage Museum		Waterbeach	Military	History of RAF Waterbeach until 1966 and of Waterbeach Barracks
Whipple Museum of the History of Science		Cambridge	Science	Historic scientific instruments and items about the history of science, part of the University of Cambridge
Whittlesey Museum		Whittlesey	Local	Local history, culture
Wimpole Hall		Wimpole	Historic house	Operated by the National Trust, opulent mansion, gardens and grounds
Wimpole Home Farm		Arrington	Agriculture	Operated by the National Trust, 18th century working farm
Wisbech Castle		Wisbech	Historic House	Regency villa (built by Joseph Medworth) and grounds operated by Wisbech Town Council.
Wisbech & Fenland Museum		Wisbech	Multiple	Local history and culture, natural history, decorative arts
Wysing Arts Centre		Bourn	Art	Contemporary arts centre

== Defunct museums ==
Name	Image	Town/City	Type	Summary
Fenland & West Norfolk Aviation Museum		Wisbech	Aviation	website, military aviation, including the World War II, the Falklands conflict and Desert Storm - collection relocated to the City of Norwich Aviation Museum, Norfolk.
