= St Neots Museum =

Coordinates: 52.2284°N 0.26913°W

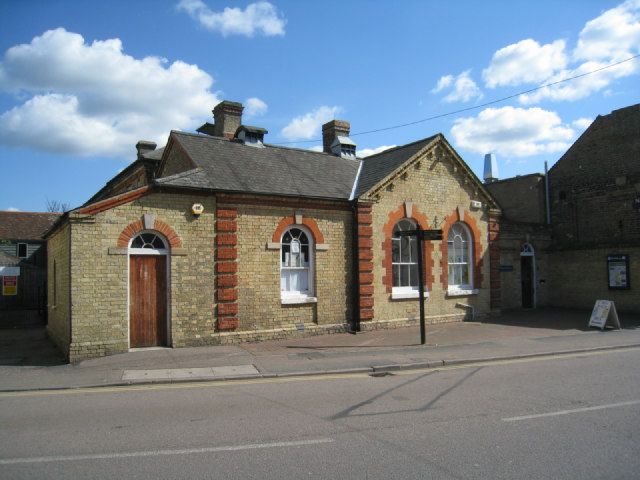
St Neots Museum

St Neots Museum is a local museum located in St Neots, within the Huntingdonshire District of Cambridgeshire, England.

The museum is housed in the Old Court, a former police station and law court building on New Street. It presents the history of the market town of St Neots on the River Great Ouse from prehistoric times onwards. The museum includes the original 1907 cell block where prisoners were detained, which is now the location for 'Jailbreak', a highly successful Escape Room which opened in April 2018, and is due to start its third season in May 2019.

== See also ==
- List of museums in Cambridgeshire
