= Roddon =

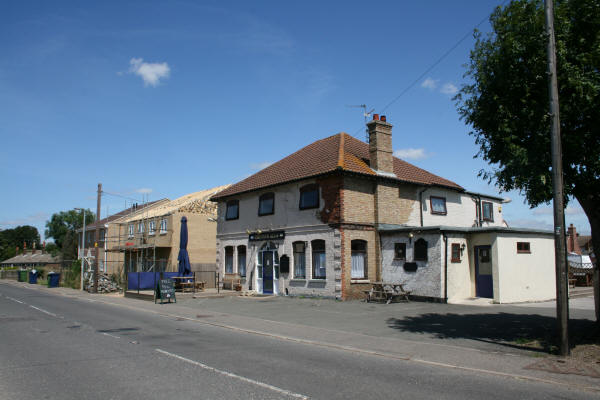
High Street, Benwick, East Cambridgeshire, built on a roddon (Note: Astbury uses the term rodham here)

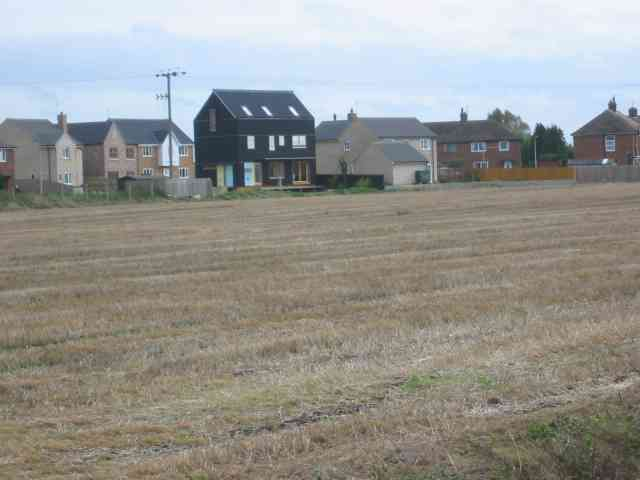
Houses built on a roddon at Prickwillow, East Cambridgeshire

A roddon, also written as rodham, roddam or rodden, is the dried raised bed of a watercourse such as a river or tidal-creek, especially in The Fens in eastern England. Such raised silt and clay-filled beds are ideal for settlement in the less firm peat of The Fens. Many writers have followed the archaeologist Major Gordon Fowler's preference for the word roddon to define such structures though modern researchers suggest the word rodham is the more correct local word.

Yew and Oak preserved in peat through which roddons passed has been dated to around 4000 years before present (BP). The origin of the raised nature of a roddon is debated; some writers suggest this is due to a silt build-up during marine incursion. Another explanation (and the one most favoured today) is based on the greater shrinkage of peat, compared to that of silt. This theory suggests that the surrounding peat lands have subsided more than the silt-filled banks of the roddon, leaving the banks raised above the general level of the area.

== Etymology ==
The term roddon may be a corruption of the now rare rodham, which meant "near a river where osiers grow", with particular reference to the River Thames; (Note: Rodham: noun. English, regional obsolete, and rare) an osier is a willow used in basket-making. (Note: Osier: noun)

Archaeologist Bob Silvester suggests that the term roddon is more popular among local writers such as Fowler (1932), Darby (1940), Phillips (1970), and Harry Godwin (1978), though rodham is acknowledged by Godwin. Silvester notes that Astbury (1958) and e.g. Seale (1975) Soil survey of Cambridgeshire preferred the term rodham. Roddam is used by Egar (1897) (Note: Egar's Fen Provincialisms, Roddam: A silt ridge. Land having an undulating surface is known as a roddamy land, or rolling land. Americans speak of the prairies of Illinois as rolling prairies.) and also by Skertchly (1877); (Note: Roddam: Sandy silt. Used only in the Isle of Ely.) in Skertchly's case, as a local term "used only in the Isle of Ely". The Oxford English Dictionary quotes (Note: Roddon: "a bed of sand resting on the clay beneath the peat ...") an even earlier written source of roddam as Wright (1857). (Note: Roddam: A bed of sand resting on the clay beneath the peat, in the fens of Cambridgeshire) Toponymist Richard Coates (2005) agrees that whilst roddon is now the normal geographical term, the older form, –(h)am, rejected by Fowler, was in fact the correct local term, and writers who followed Fowler are wrong. Astbury goes further, quoting Clarke (1852) (Note: "And in almost every part of the fens veins of silt (apparently the warped-up courses of creeks,) may be traced within it in nearly every direction") discussing "veins of silt" as silted-up creeks, which Astbury claims are rodhams, though Clarke does not use that term.

Journalist A K Astbury (1987) also examines the word roddin, (Note: Roddin: noun) which means a rough path or a track trodden by sheep. He says that in north Lincolnshire, a roading is a private and little-used road. Astbury agrees that later writers have adopted Fowler's spelling though he still maintains that fenmen call such silted-up old river beds rodhams. None of the different spelling variations of roddon is found in Robert Forby's The Vocabulary of East Anglia.

== Formation ==
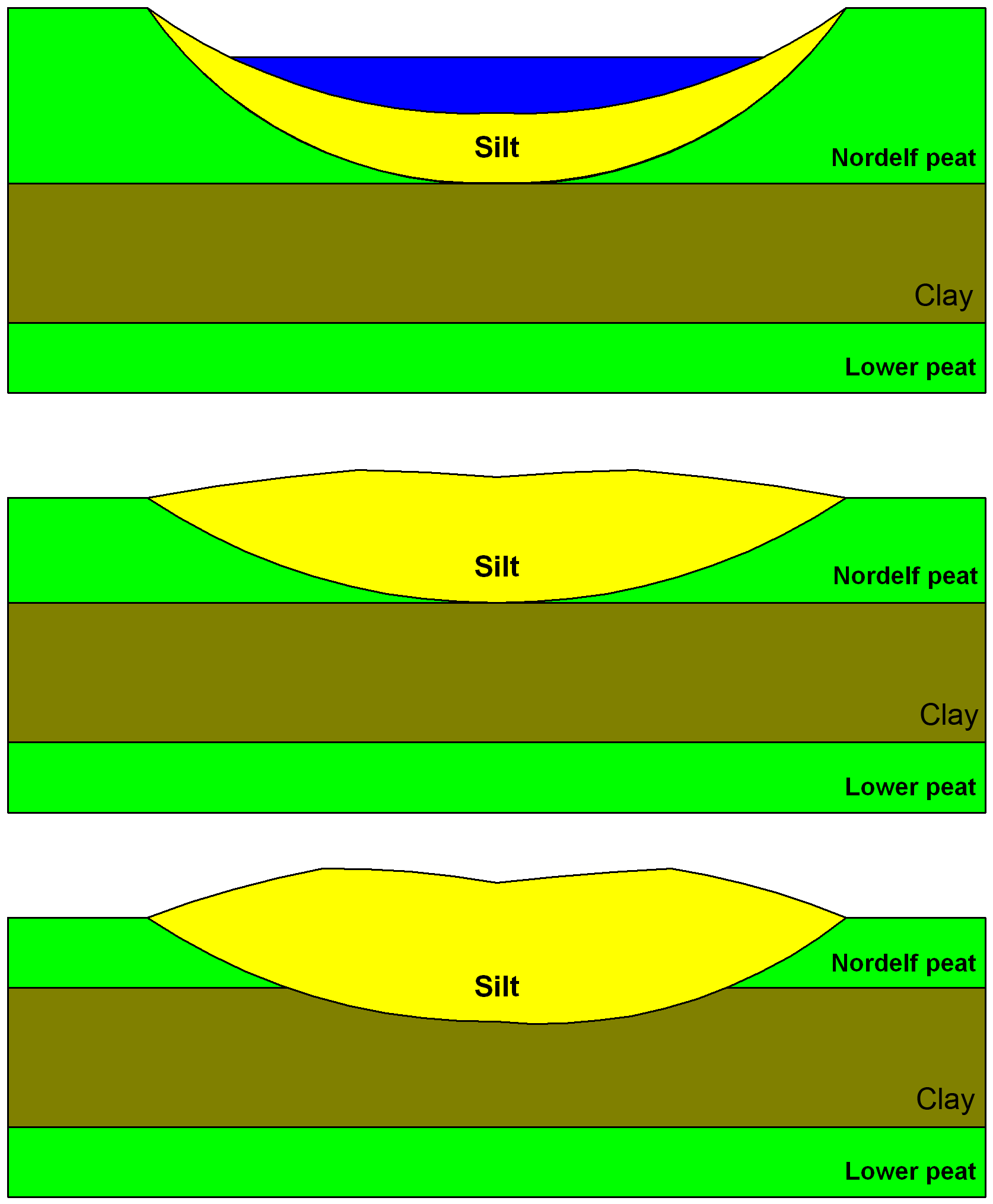
The formation of a roddon after Fowler (1932). Lower peat dated between about 5400 and 4700 years before present (BP)

Carbon dating of bog oak found in the Fen Edge peat of Adventurers Fen near Wicken, almost 57 kilometres (35 mi) from the nearest present-day coast at Kings Lynn, suggests the peat (Note: The fenland basin has had a complex history of marine and freshwater incursions. Peat forms by vegetation establishing in freshwater, dying in salt water and then being preserved in freshwater. Over 80% of the Ely district was covered with a Nordelph peat bed of approximately 2 metres (6 ft 7 in) thick until draining in the Middle Ages allowed the peat to dry out and waste away leaving beds of less than 1 metre (3 ft 3 in) around most of the area.) in this area was formed by a large marine incursion in about 2400 BC. (Note: Worssam reports "Radiocarbon dates of about 2400 years B.C. ... (Godwin and Willis 1961, p.66)"; Adventurer's Fen, Wicken, Cambridgeshire, tree no. 1: 4380 ± 140) The Nordelph peat, which covers a large area of fenland, including most of the Ely district, began forming around 4000 BP. Sampling of roddons in the area has confirmed that they were formed from the mid– to late–Holocene age — 6000–2000 BP. The raised and layered banks of silt in a roddon contain mostly estuarine foraminifera and ostracods, which suggests that the silt was deposited through tidal processes.

The raised nature of the roddon is debated. The archaeologist Major Gordon Fowler explained these are due to the extensive drainage of the fens, and "differential shrinkage" of the silt bed and the surrounding peat. Harry Godwin noted that near the Holme Fen post the peat surface stood 1.8 metres (5 ft 11 in) above ordnance datum (OD) in 1848 with the clay of the fen floor about 5.5 metres (18 ft) below OD. In 1957 Godwin reported the peat surface at the same post 2.5 metres (8 ft 2 in) below OD — a shrinkage of 4.3 metres (14 ft) in 109 years. The peat is now 2.75 metres (9 ft 0 in) below OD in the area. The cause of the shrinking is due to a combination of drying out, trench cutting for peat-fuel, biological oxidation and surface burning associated with arable farming.

Godwin suggests that roddons were formed in the Romano-British age (AD 43–500) during a second and less severe marine incursion, which left extensive silt deposits on the seaward parts of the fens and "silt deposition up the main rivers", forming raised banks or levees. Dinah Smith agrees with Fowler, suggesting that the raised nature of the silt banks are due to the "subsidence" of the surrounding area, mainly caused by human activity, such as agriculture and drainage. These have permanently changed the environment, and future marine incursions may not have the same effects as historical ones.

== Settlements ==
In recounting the building practices of the local area, Astbury notes that major structures such as the monasteries at Ely, Thorney and Crowland were built on islands or ridges. These structures rest on Cretaceous Lower Greensand that overlie Jurassic period Kimmeridge on top of Jurassic period Ampthill clays. For example, the village of Little Thetford, 5 kilometres (3 mi) south of Ely, lies at about 5 metres (16 ft) above sea-level, and sits largely on an island of Kimmeridge Clay, a Jurassic shallow-water shelf-sea deposit. Underlying the Kimmeridge Clay are older Jurassic clays, which also contain thin beds of limestone and sandstone.

Buildings can and have been erected on peat although it is a poor founding material. Older houses, in the area of Burnt Fen near Littleport, Cambridgeshire, were built on peat whilst more modern buildings in the same area are built on concrete raft foundations floating on the peat.

In contrast, Benwick, 22 kilometres (14 mi) north-west of Ely, is an example of a settlement built on a roddon of the old West Water. "Once described as the 'only village on the peat'", Benwick's High Street is built on a roddon. The roddon that was the course of the River Great Ouse forms a base for the very small hamlet of Prickwillow, 6 kilometres (3.7 mi) north-east of Ely. Wisbech St Mary, a small village 3 kilometres (1.9 mi) west of Wisbech is built on a roddon. Spaindelf Farm is built on the dried out bed of the Little Ouse.

A roddon noted by Fowler in 1932 at Rodham Farm, 4 kilometres (2.5 mi) north-east of March, Cambridgeshire was exposed in a pit just east of the farm cottage. At that time, this roddon was 2.45 metres (8 ft) above the nearby peat and was 64 metres (70 yd) wide on its curved surface. It was once thought to be an ancient gravel track. Piles need to be used on the sides of dykes that cut through large roddons to prevent the silt of the roddon collapsing into the dyke.
