= St Peter's Church, Prickwillow =

Coordinates: 52.4171°N 0.3464°E

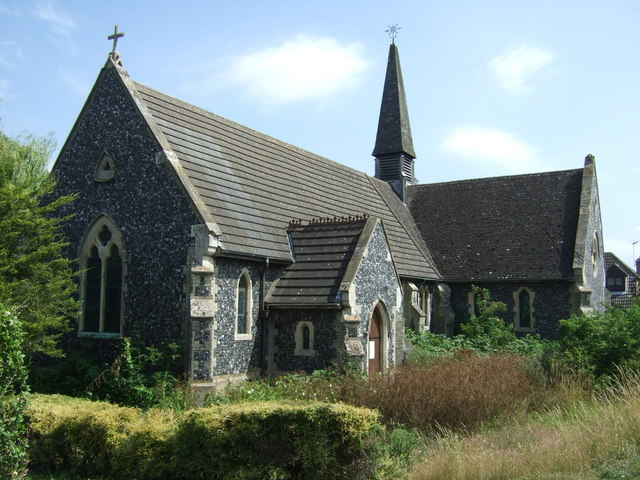

- Location in Cambridgeshire
- Location: Prickwillow, Cambridgeshire
- Country: England
- Denomination: Church of England

History
- Status: Parish church
- Founded: 1868
- Dedication: Saint Peter

Architecture
- Functional status: inactive
- Architect: R R Rowe
- Architectural type: Church
- Style: Gothic
- Completed: 1866–8
- Closed: 2008

Administration
- Province: Province of Canterbury
- Diocese: Diocese of Ely
- Parish: Ely, Cambridgeshire

Clergy
- Bishop: Bishop of Ely

St Peter's Church, Prickwillow, is a redundant Anglican church in the village of Prickwillow, Cambridgeshire, England. It was built between 1866 and 1868 to the design of Richard Reynolds Rowe, and was listed at Grade II by Historic England in 2026.

== History ==
Following the growth of the village of Prickwillow owing to the diversion of the River Great Ouse, a church was provided: formerly the village was in the parish of Holy Trinity and St Mary, Ely. It was built between 1866 and 1868 of knapped flint with brick dressings on a foundation of wooden piles by Richard Reynolds Rowe, an architect who worked extensively in Cambridgeshire. The church has a nave, central bell turret, transepts, and south porch. The elaborately carved font of Italian marble, perhaps from Carrara, was given to Ely Cathedral by Dean Spencer in 1693. The font cover is hung from the ceiling by the figure of an angel. After the church was declared redundant in 2011, the font was returned to the cathedral. The 1691 bell was also given by Ely Cathedral. The baptism register starts in 1874 and the marriages in 1864. There is no graveyard as nearby Ely is used.

The church became a Grade II listed building on 10 March 2026.

== Bibliography ==
- Pevsner, Nikolaus (1970), Cambridgeshire (Pevsner Architectural Guides: Buildings of England) (2nd ed.), Yale University Press, ISBN 978-0-300-09586-9
- T.D. Atkinson; Ethel M. Hampson; E.T. Long; C.A.F. Meekings; Edward Miller; H.B. Wells; G.M.G. Woodgate (1953). Pugh, R.B. (ed.). The Victoria History of the Counties of England: Cambridge and the isle of Ely. Vol. IV. Oxford University Press.
- Pevsner, Nikolaus; Simon Bradley (2014), Cambridgeshire (Pevsner Architectural Guides: Buildings of England) (3rd ed.), Yale University Press, ISBN 978-0-300-20596-1
