= List of museums in Cambridge =

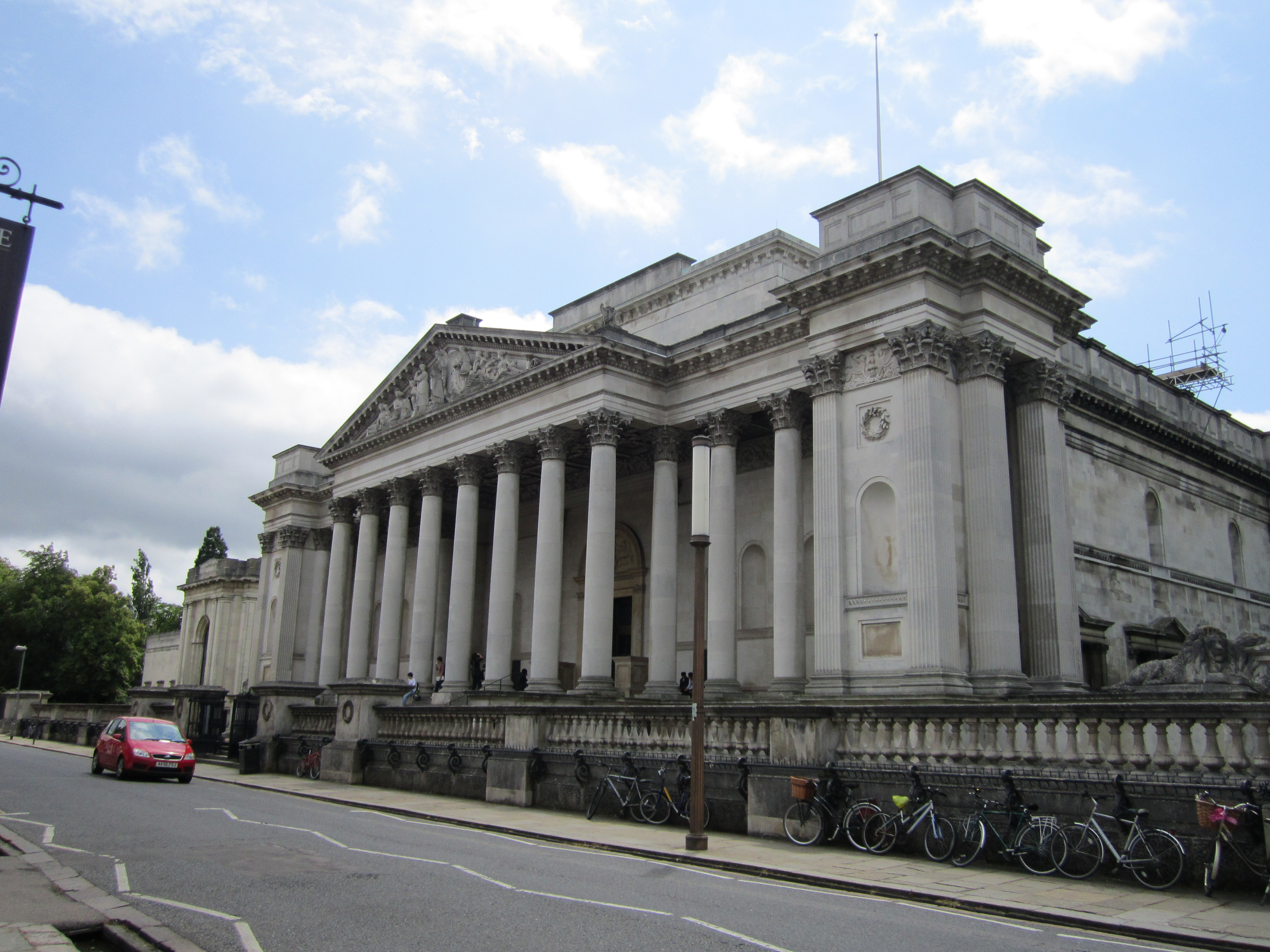
The Fitzwilliam Museum in Cambridge

The following museums and art galleries are located in Cambridge, England:

- Cambridge Museum of Technology – Housed in the sewage pumping station, print room and old machines, local industries and equipment
- Cambridge Science Centre – Interactive museum of science and technology
- Cambridge University Library – Events held in the Exhibition Centre
- Cambridge University Museum of Zoology – University of Cambridge – Specimens and skeletons of fossils, animals, insects and birds from around the world
- Centre for Computing History – Museum telling the story of the Information Age
- Fitzwilliam Museum – University of Cambridge – Museum with collections of art, manuscripts, coins, medals, and antiquities
- Heong Gallery – Modern and contemporary art gallery at Downing College
- Kettle's Yard – University of Cambridge Art gallery with collections of contemporary and modern art
- Lawrence Room at Girton College – features Anglo-Saxon, Egyptian and Mediterranean artefacts
- Museum of Archaeology and Anthropology – University of Cambridge Archaeological and anthropological artefacts and photographs from around the world, including a totem pole
- Museum of Cambridge – Museum of the history of Cambridge, Cambridgeshire, regional folklore and local life
- Museum of Classical Archaeology – University of Cambridge – Museum of plaster casts of classical Greek and Roman statues and sculpture
- People's Portraits Exhibition at Girton College – exhibition of the Royal Society of Portrait Painters showing 'ordinary' British people at the verge of the 21st century
- Round Church Visitor Centre – History of the Round Church, the development of Cambridge and the university
- Ruskin Gallery – art gallery of Anglia Ruskin University
- Sedgwick Museum – University of Cambridge Museum of fossil animals and plants, dinosaurs, and rocks and minerals
- The Polar Museum – University of Cambridge – Museum dedicated to the history and science of Arctic and Antarctic exploration
- The Women's Art Collection at Murray Edwards College, Cambridge – Gallery and collection of modern and contemporary art by female artists
- Whipple Museum of the History of Science – University of Cambridge Scientific instruments, models and displays on the history of science, dating from medieval times to the present day

== See also ==
- List of museums in Cambridgeshire
- List of museums in Oxford
- University of Cambridge Museums is a consortium of the eight museums of the University of Cambridge
