= Lion Yard =

Shopping centre in Cambridge

Coordinates: 52°12′17″N 0°7′14.7″E

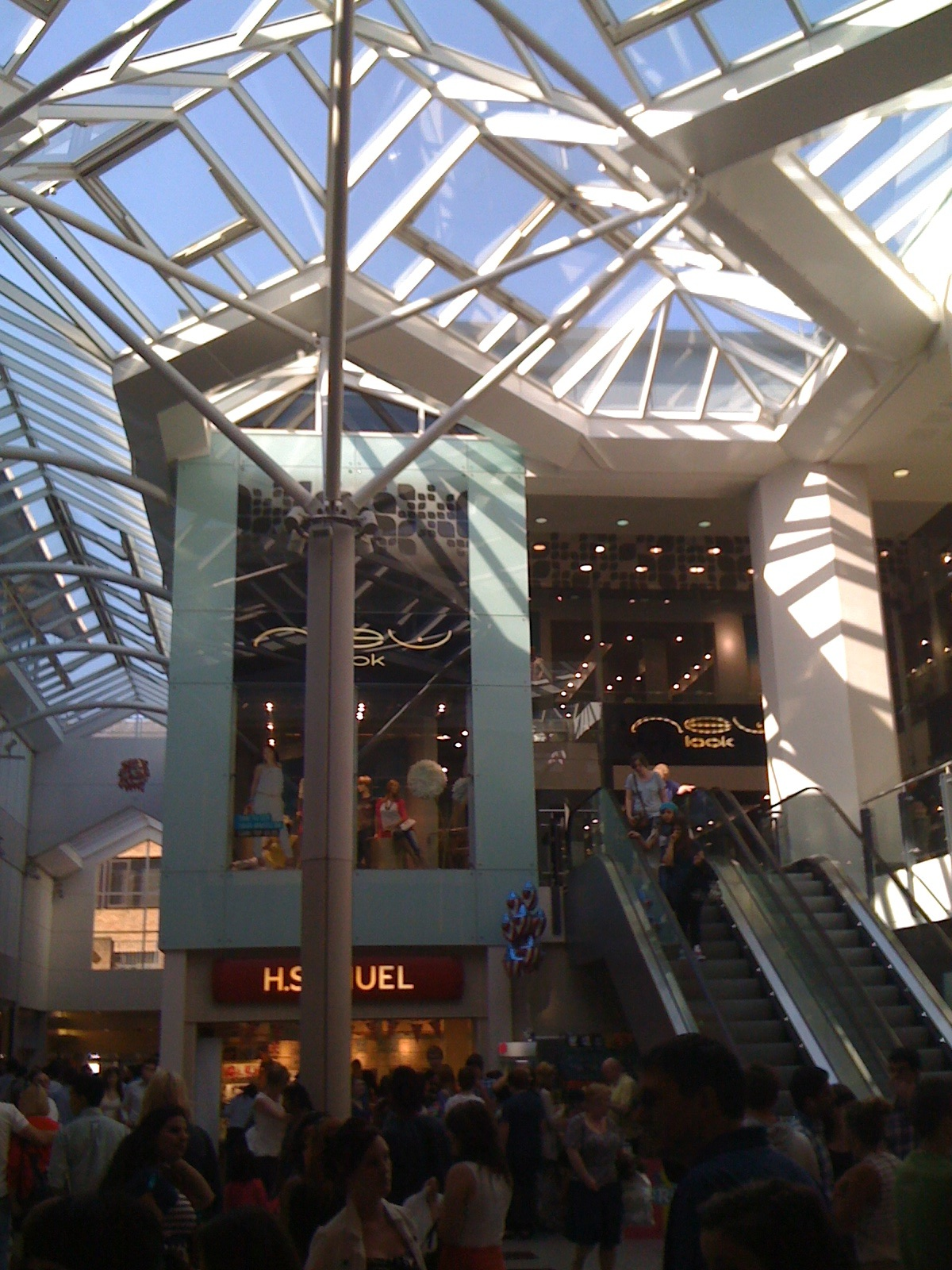

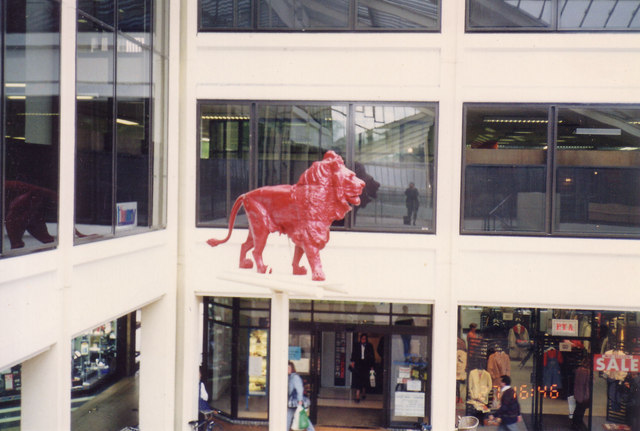
The former Red Lion statue, photographed in 1992

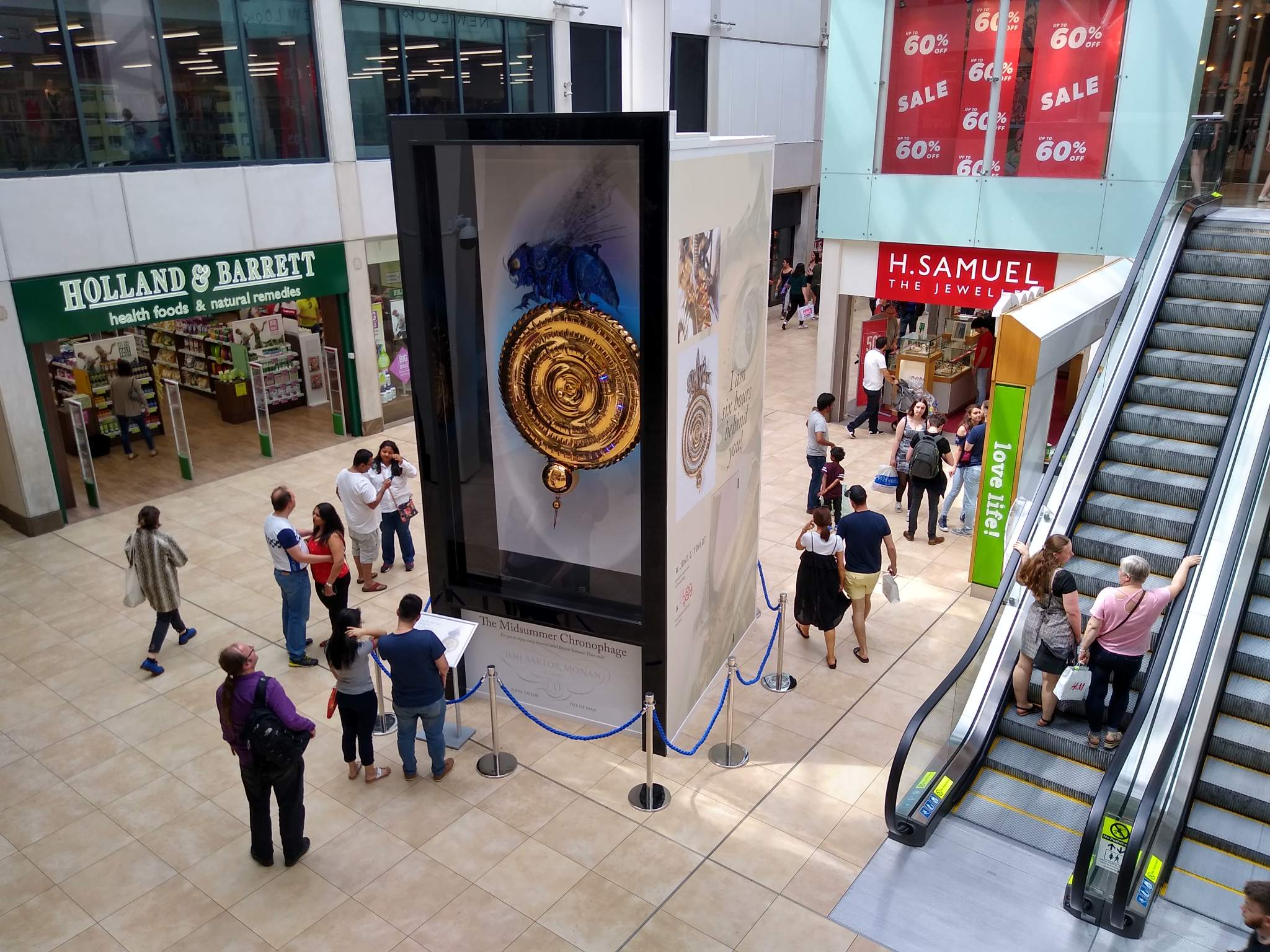
A variant of the Corpus Clock in the Lion Yard atrium in June 2019

The Lion Yard shopping centre is a covered shopping centre in the city centre of Cambridge, England. Construction work on the centre, which is bounded by St Andrew's Street, Corn Exchange Street, and Petty Cury, commenced in 1970 and the development contained a library, multi-storey car park and magistrates' court.

It predates and is significantly smaller than either the Grafton Centre or the Grand Arcade. The latter connects directly to Lion Yard. The Grafton Centre is situated just outside the city centre.

For many years a central feature of the atrium was a white pillar with the statue of a large red lion on the top of it, safely out of easy reach. This recalled the Red Lion pub which had occupied the site until demolished in 1969. The lion statue was removed in 1999 and is now at the Cambridge University rugby club's ground on Grange Road. A red lion is an emblem of the University of Cambridge and the crest of its rugby club.

Lion Yard was refurbished in the late 1990s/early 2000s. A covered shopping centre, the Grand Arcade mentioned above, adjoins Lion Yard on its south side; the two are interconnected.

The main shopping mall is centred around an atrium which benefits from four entrances and exits. The retail element is concentrated on the ground floor; however, the Central Library can be accessed from the first floor of Lion Yard along with retailers Ellis Brigham, The North Face and New Look.

The Centre consists of a three-storey office block (Lion House and St George House), an undercover external colonnade taking up one half of Petty Cury, external shops opposite St Andrew the Great Church, many high street retailers internally along with housing the seventh busiest library in the UK.
