= Richard Rowe (priest) =

Richard Rowe was Archdeacon of Armagh from 1427 until his deprivation in 1429.
