= Prickwillow =

Village in Cambridgeshire, England

Coordinates: 52.415°N 0.340°E

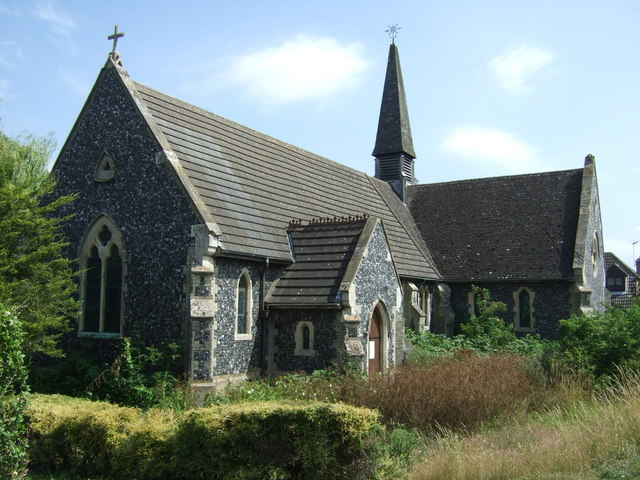
- St Peter's Church

- Location within Cambridgeshire
- OS grid reference: TL597824
  - London: 65 miles (105 km)
- Civil parish: Ely
- District: East Cambridgeshire
- Shire county: Cambridgeshire
- Region: East
- Country: England
- Sovereign state: United Kingdom
- Post town: ELY
- Postcode district: CB7
- Dialling code: 01353
- Police: Cambridgeshire
- Fire: Cambridgeshire
- Ambulance: East of England
- UK Parliament: South East Cambridgeshire

Prickwillow is a village in the civil parish of Ely, in the East Cambridgeshire district, in Cambridgeshire, England, with an estimated population of 440 as of 2005. Originally a small hamlet on the banks of the River Great Ouse, it is now on the banks of the River Lark since re-organisation of the river system. It lies in the south of the Fens, 4 miles (6.4 km) east of the city of Ely, and is home to Prickwillow Museum, which tells the story of the changing face of Fenland. Prickwillow Museum is housed in the old pumping station and contains a major collection of working pumping engines. The village is also home to the Ely Group of Internal Drainage Boards.

== History ==
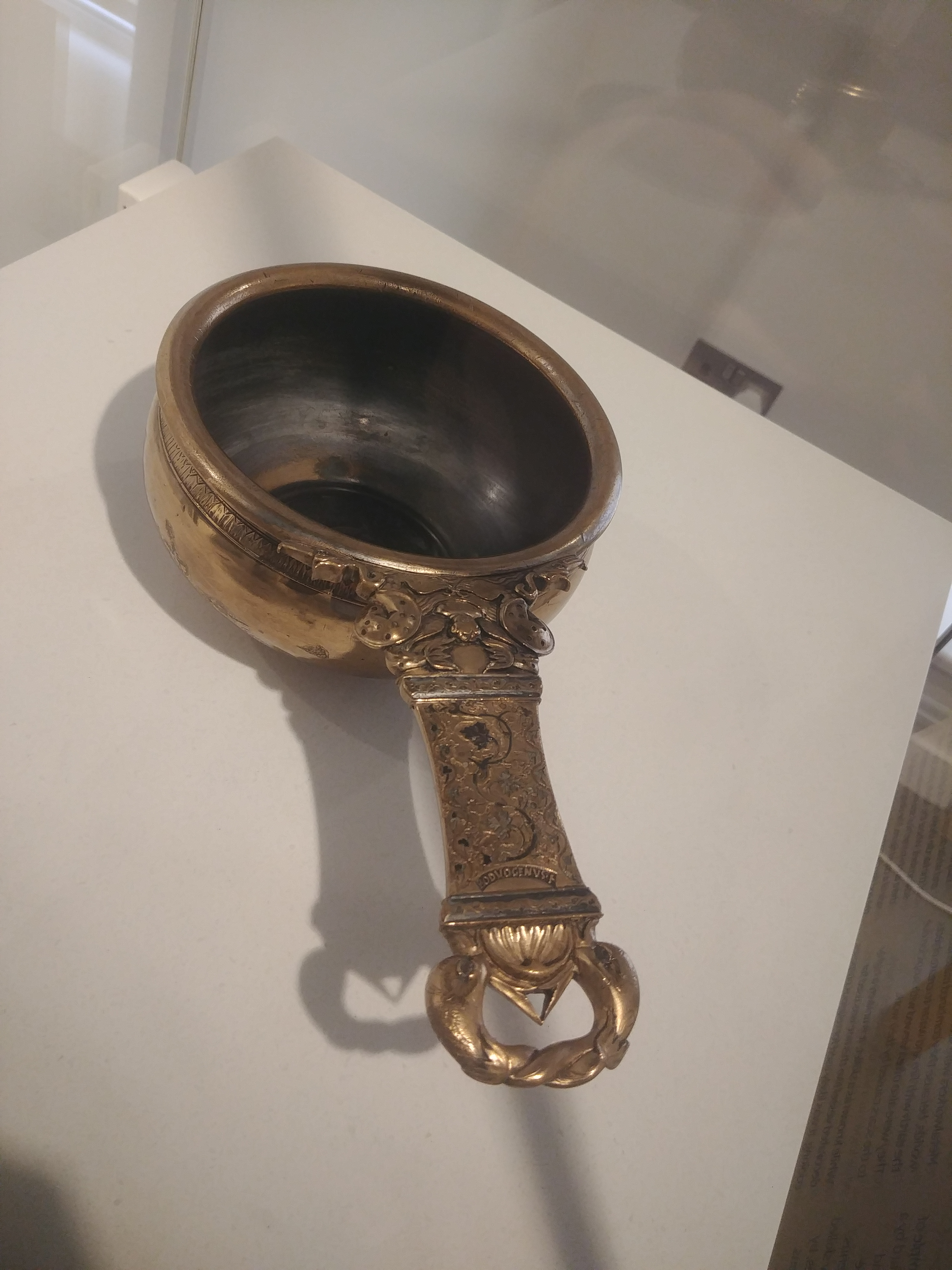
Prickwillow skillet, from above

Evidence for very early settlements near Prickwillow was unearthed in the 1930s, when an archaeological dig took place at Plantation Farm and Peacocks Farm, by the A1101. This provided evidence for Roman and three levels of prehistoric settlements just to the east of the village.

The modern parish of Prickwillow was formed in 1878. The name is said to be a reference to the 'prickets' of willow—long thin skewers used to make thatch—that grew in the surrounding marshy land.

Prior to the nineteenth century, the River Great Ouse flowed east of Ely as far as Prickwillow, before rejoining the modern course of the Ouse at Littleport. In 1829–30, however, the river was diverted north from Ely, and the original channel ploughed and filled in. Today's village lies on the site of the old riverbank, with evidence of the original course remaining in the name of the roads (e.g. Old Bank) and the meandering edges of the neighbouring fields (visible on this satellite image). Astbury terms such old watercourses rodhams and another East Anglian village, Benwick is similarly built on a rodham.

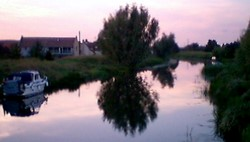
A view over the River Lark from the bridge at Prickwillow.

Ordnance Survey maps from the 1920s show a network of agricultural tramways running from Lark Hall Farm on the west bank of the River Lark south east of the village onto Great Fen extending to Hasse Road. Other tramways ran from the east bank of the River Lark extending to Shippea Hill station.

== Drainage ==
Much of the Prickwillow area lies below sea level so, in order to ensure that the land remained arable, a series of steam pumping engines were installed at the base of the newly dug drain, linked to the River Lark. The first of these was the steam side-lever engine, installed in 1831. This was replaced in the 1880s by the steam beam engine, itself replaced in 1924 by the powerful Mirrlees, Bickerton and Day Diesel. With a weight of 25 tonnes and a nominal power output of 250bhp at 250rpm, this engine ran until the 1970s, when it was replaced with automatic electric pumps.

The Mirrlees diesel engine remains the centrepiece of the Prickwillow Museum, and is believed to be the only example of an air-blast injection engine remaining in working order. The museum also contains other diesel engines, dating from 1919, recovered from other local pumping stations, and restored by volunteers. The Diesel pumping engines are demonstrated to interested visitors on several days throughout the year.

Prickwillow is the current office and workshop base for the Ely Group of Internal Drainage Boards who maintain the current electric pumping station in Prickwillow and surrounding watercourses. The group consists of ten internal drainage boards (IDBs) whose boundaries extend to the New Bedford River and Welney to the west and Mildenhall and Lakenheath to the east. The IDBs provide water level and flood risk management within their districts.

In the 1920s, it was reported that the constant draining of the land resulted in the peaty soil sinking by 2 inches (51 mm) every year. The local school buildings and St Peter's Church, built in 1862 and 1866–68 respectively, as well as many of the local houses, were built on piles to ensure stable foundations. Two steps were built up to the front door of the vicarage, but many more had to be added as the land gradually sank. In addition, owing to the high water table, church burials take place in the more elevated settlement of Ely. St Peter's Church itself was declared redundant in 2011 and was listed at Grade II in 2026.

The B1104 between Prickwillow and neighbouring Isleham is reputedly the most subsidence affected road in the country; so undulating is the 6.4-mile (10.3 km) drive that some have experienced bouts of motion sickness equal to that of seasickness.

== Other ==
The combinations of banks and ditches could be a hazard for the unwary, as a newspaper article of 1872 demonstrates: Narrow Escape. On Saturday evening last one of our neighbours of the name of "Burt", managed to tumble off the bank into the ditch. Some persons passing by heard a strange gurgling sound in the ditch, and made a search, when they found the unfortunate Burt immersed and nearly exhausted; of course they rescued him. It appears that Burt had got "Mr. Beer's" boots on, and the bank not being wide enough for the said boots, he walked into the dyke. Very bad boots those for a narrow bank and dark night! Prickwillow had broadband fibre provision installed within the village in 2015. A local company, 4SG Telecom also provides broadband in the village.
