= St Andrew's Street, Cambridge =

Street in Cambridge, England

Coordinates: 52.2031°N 0.1239°E

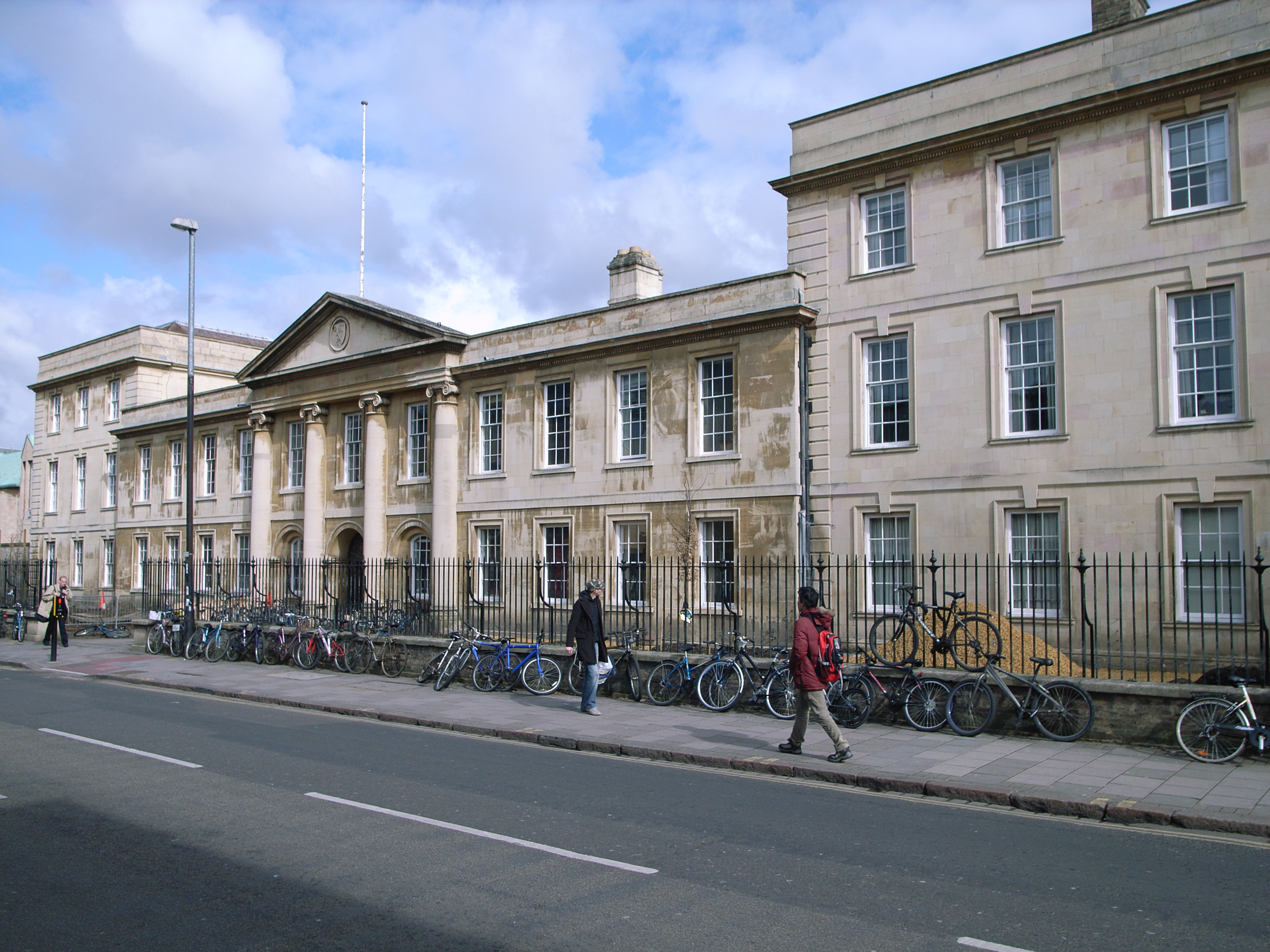
Emmanuel College on St Andrew's Street.

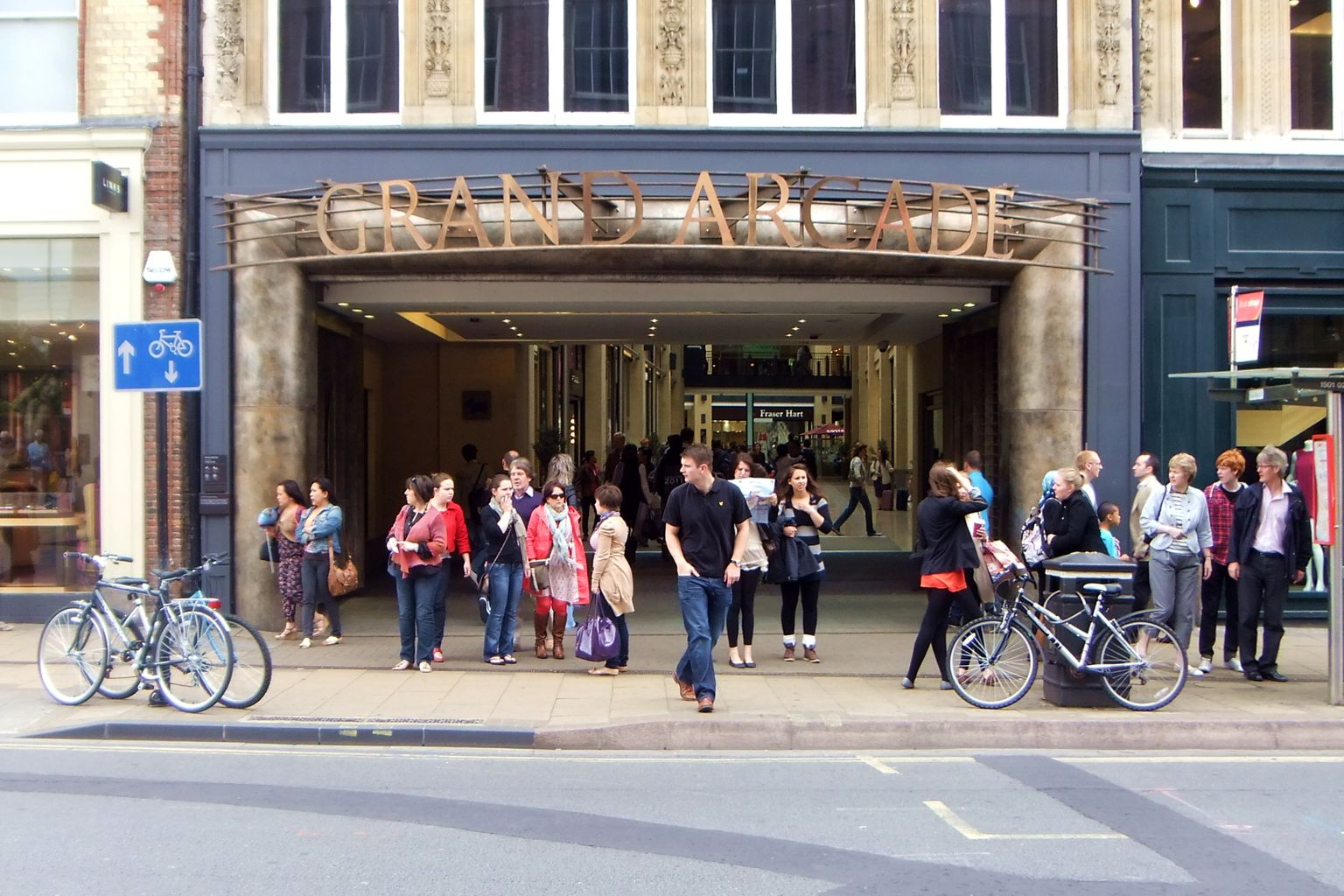
The Grand Arcade entrance on St Andrew's Street.

St Andrew's Street is a major street in central Cambridge, England. It runs between Sidney Street, at the junction with Hobson Street, to the northwest and Regent Street to the southeast. Downing Street leads off to the west.

On the northeastern side of the street are the University of Cambridge colleges Christ's College and Emmanuel College. On the southwestern side are St Andrew the Great church and St Andrew's Street Baptist Church.

== Shops ==
The street also has a number of shops. For example, the following are located here:

- The Robert Sayle (1840–2004) then John Lewis (since 2007) department store
- The Grand Arcade shopping mall (since 2008)

== Hobson's Conduit ==
The St Andrew's Street branch of Hobson's Conduit was added in 1631, providing a supply of water. It flowed from the conduit head along Lensfield Road in the south of Cambridge, then through St Andrew's Street and towards Drummer Street. Here it split into feeds that ran into Christ's College and Emmanuel College, as well as a public dipping point. Much of the open conduit that ran along St Andrew's Street was covered in 1996 as part of pedestrian improvements.

== Mystery Cavern ==
During October 2010, engineers excavating what had been believed to be a collapsed sewer underneath the road discovered a man-made subterranean chamber measuring 9 metres (30 feet) in depth and 6 metres (20 feet) in length. A spokesman for Anglian Water, the organisation carrying out the work, told reporters that the chamber had been dug recently but precisely when - and by whom - is currently subject to investigation. One possible explanation is that the cavern is an abandoned telecommunications vault dug during the extensive building work that took place along St. Andrew's Street in 2007 and 2008 during the construction of the Grand Arcade or during the demolition of Bradwell's Court, a shopping mall that stood opposite where the Arcade now stands.
