= Cambridge Corn Exchange =

Municipal building in Cambridge, England

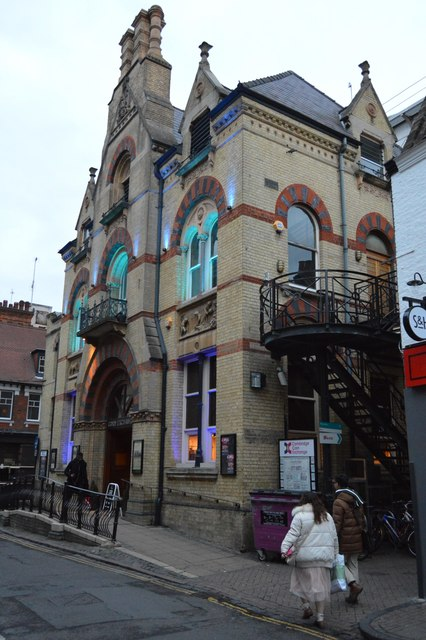
- Cambridge Corn Exchange

- Shown in Cambridgeshire
- 52.2044°N 0.1197°E
- Location: Wheeler Street, Cambridge

History
- Built: 1876

Site notes
- Architect: Richard Reynolds Rowe
- Architectural style: Gothic Revival style

Listed Building – Grade II
- Official name: Corn Exchange
- Designated: 18 May 1967
- Reference no.: 1126025

The Corn Exchange is an events and concert venue located on Wheeler Street in Cambridge, Cambridgeshire, England. The structure, which was commissioned as a corn exchange, is a Grade II listed building.

== History ==
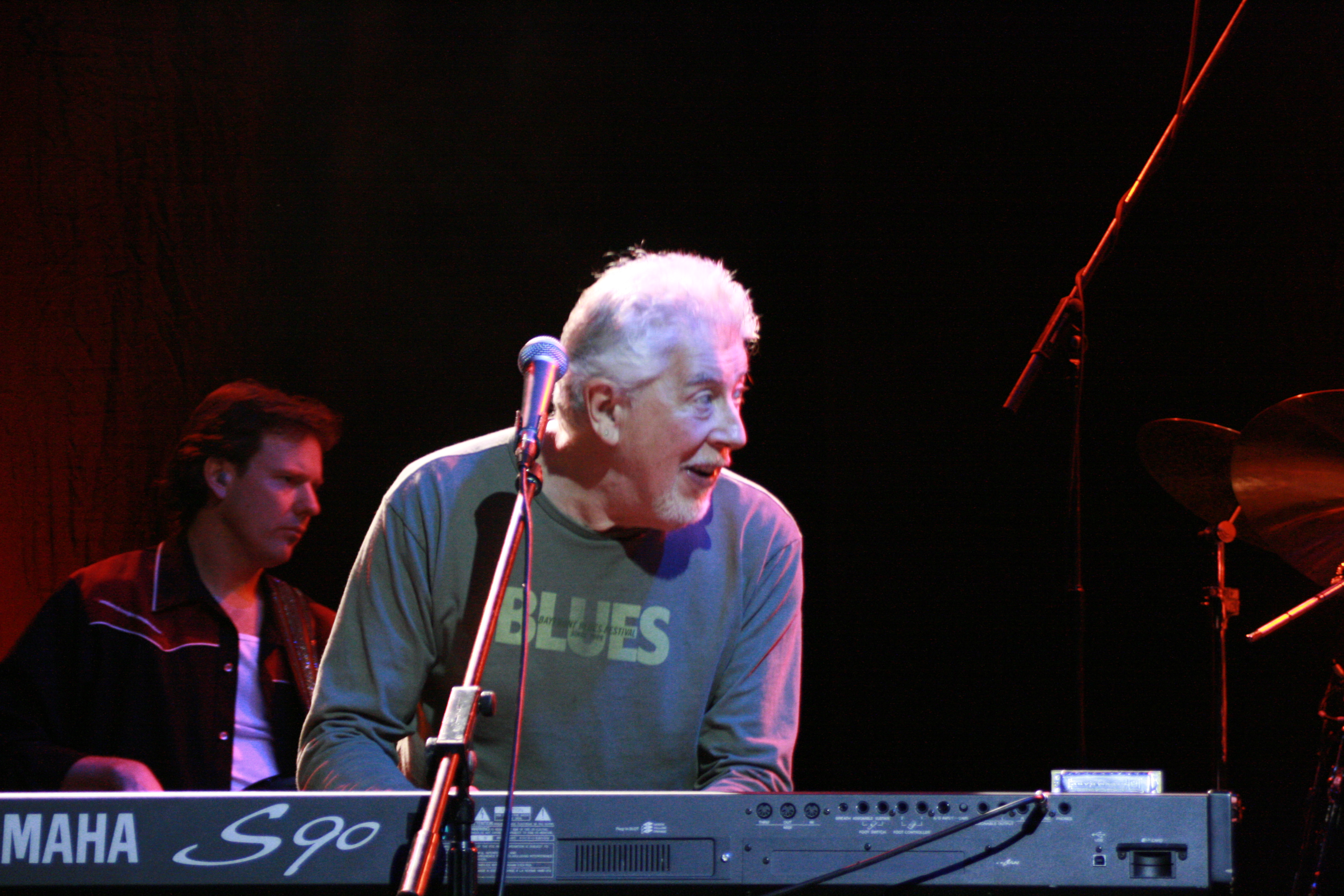
Hank Van Sickle (background) and John Mayall (John Mayall & the Bluesbreakers) at the Cambridge Corn Exchange, November 2006

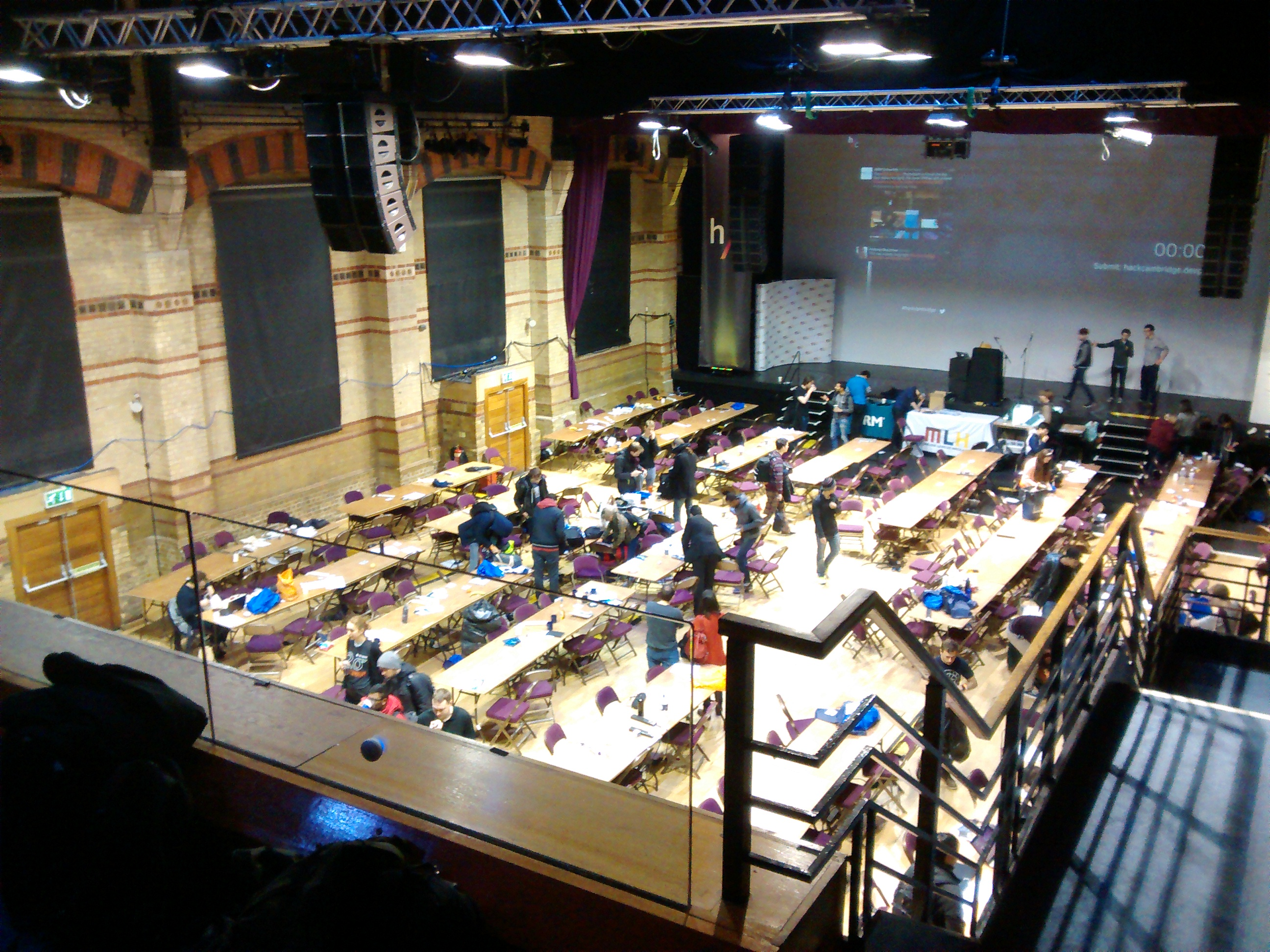
The stage and interior of the Cambridge Corn Exchange viewed from the balcony during a hackathon

The first corn exchange in Cambridge was built on St Andrew's Hill in 1842. By the late 1860s, it was considered too small, and civic officials decided to commission a larger building on a site once occupied by the Black Bear Inn.

The foundation stone for the new building was laid by the mayor, John Death, on 26 May 1874. It was designed by Richard Reynolds Rowe in the Gothic Revival style, built using bricks cast in a variety of colours and was officially opened on 6 November 1875. The design involved a symmetrical main frontage of three bays facing Wheeler Street. The central bay, which was slightly projected forward, featured an arched doorway flanked by foliated pilasters supporting voussoirs. There was a round headed window with a balcony on the first floor and a round headed window with a window sill on the second floor with a gable above. The outer bays were fenestrated with bi-partite casement windows on the ground floor, bi-partite mullioned windows with round heads on the first floor and dormer windows with finials on the second floor. The architectural historian, Nikolaus Pevsner, disliked the design and described it as "very ugly".

On 9 November 1875, there was an opening concert featuring a performance by the Coldstream Guards and a local choral society. During the playing of the national anthem a mistake was made, and angry crowds subsequently attacked the mayor's house. The resulting trial attracted the world's press and resulted in crowds of sightseers making visits to the building, interfering with the corn trading.

The use of the building as a corn exchange declined significantly in the wake of the Great Depression of British Agriculture in the late 19th century.

However, the site became a popular location for events in late 19th and early 20th centuries. The first Motor Show of many was held in 1898, the venue hosted the London Symphony Orchestra in 1925 and one thousand people were welcomed to a Tea For a Thousand in 1935. During the 1940s the venue was used to clean and repair rifles by local women. After the war, the venue was popular for boxing, wrestling and roller skating. The floor was usually marked out for badminton matches which were held in the building. A temporary wooden bridge across Wheeler Street was even constructed in the 1950s to join it to the neighbouring Guildhall for balls and other events.

In 1965, the venue ceased being used for trading after the Cattle Market site was opened as an alternative. In the 1970s the building was used for pop concerts and one-day exhibitions. In 1974 1,000 fans caused a riot after The Drifters failed to appear onstage.

The venue was closed in 1981 after the roof was found to be unsafe and following complaints from residents about noise levels. The building was refitted following public pressure and various grants and donations, with the first concert taking place on 3 December 1986 starring Boxcar Willie, though an official reopening occurred the following February with a performance by the Royal Philharmonic Orchestra.

Anglia Ruskin University (ARU) in Cambridge holds its graduation ceremonies at the Cambridge Corn Exchange.

Performers at the venue have included David Bowie (1966), The Who (1969), Black Sabbath (1970), Genesis (1970), Status Quo (1972), Rory Gallagher (1972), Nazareth (1973), Thin Lizzy (1973), Syd Barrett (1974), Queen (1974), AC/DC (1976), Judas Priest (1976), Lemmy (1979), Def Leppard (1980), Johnny Cash (1988), Ozzy Osbourne (1988), OMD (1991), Blur (1991), Pulp (1992), Tori Amos (1992), Take That (1992), Van Morrison (1992), Oasis (1994), Victoria Wood (1996), Deep Purple (1996), Jamiroquai (1996), Robbie Williams (1997), Daft Punk (1997), Foo Fighters (1997), Björk (1998), Jimmy Carr (2005), Amy Winehouse (2006), Lily Allen (2007), Manic Street Preachers (2008), Adele (2008), John Cleese (2011), and Paul Weller (2015).

== See also ==
- Corn exchanges in England
