= Bodley's Librarian =

Head of the Bodleian Library in Oxford, England

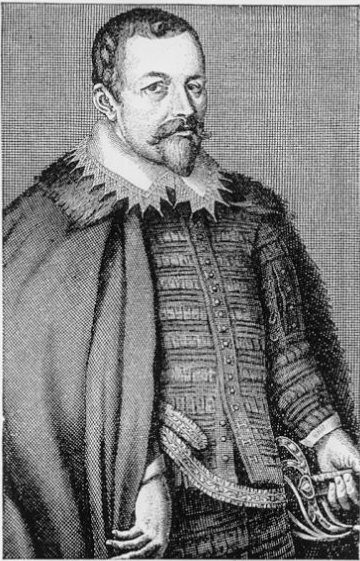
Sir Thomas Bodley, founder of the Bodleian Library

The head of the Bodleian Library, the main library at the University of Oxford, is known as Bodley's Librarian: Sir Thomas Bodley, as founder, gave his name to both the institution and the position. Although there had been a university library at Oxford since about 1320, it had declined by the end of the 16th century. It was "denuded" of its books in 1550 in the time of King Edward VI when "superstitious books and images" that did not comply with the prevailing Anglican view were removed. Poor management and inadequate financial resources have also been blamed for the state of the library. In the words of one history of the university, "as a public institution, the Library had ceased to function." Bodley volunteered in 1598 to restore it; the university accepted the offer, and work began soon afterwards. The first librarian, Thomas James, was selected by Bodley in 1599. The Bodleian opened in 1602, and the university confirmed James in his post. Bodley wanted the librarian to be "some one that is noted and known for a diligent student, and in all his conversation to be trusty, active, and discrete, a graduate also and a linguist, not encumbered with marriage, nor with a benefice of Cure" (i.e. not a parish priest). James, however, was able to persuade Bodley to let him marry and become Rector of St Aldate's Church, Oxford.

In all, 25 people have served as Bodley's Librarian; their levels of diligence have varied over the years. Thomas Lockey (1660–65) was regarded by the 17th-century Oxford antiquarian Anthony Wood as not fit for the post, John Hudson (1701–19) has been described as "negligent if not incapable", and John Price (1768–1813) was accused by a contemporary scholar of "a regular and constant neglect of his duty". The current librarian, Richard Ovenden, was appointed in 2014. The title was extended to Bodley's Librarian and the Helen Hamlyn Director of the University Libraries in 2025.

== Librarians ==
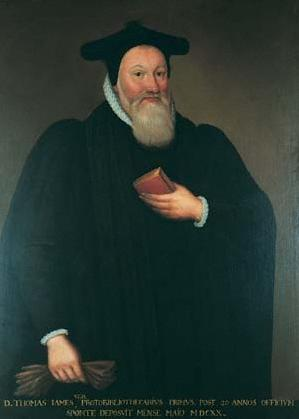
Thomas James, the first Bodley's Librarian

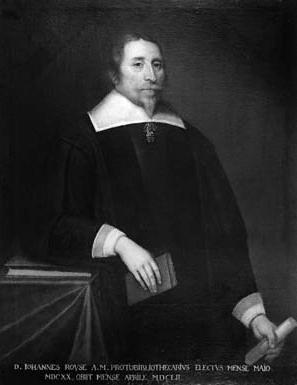
John Rouse, the second librarian

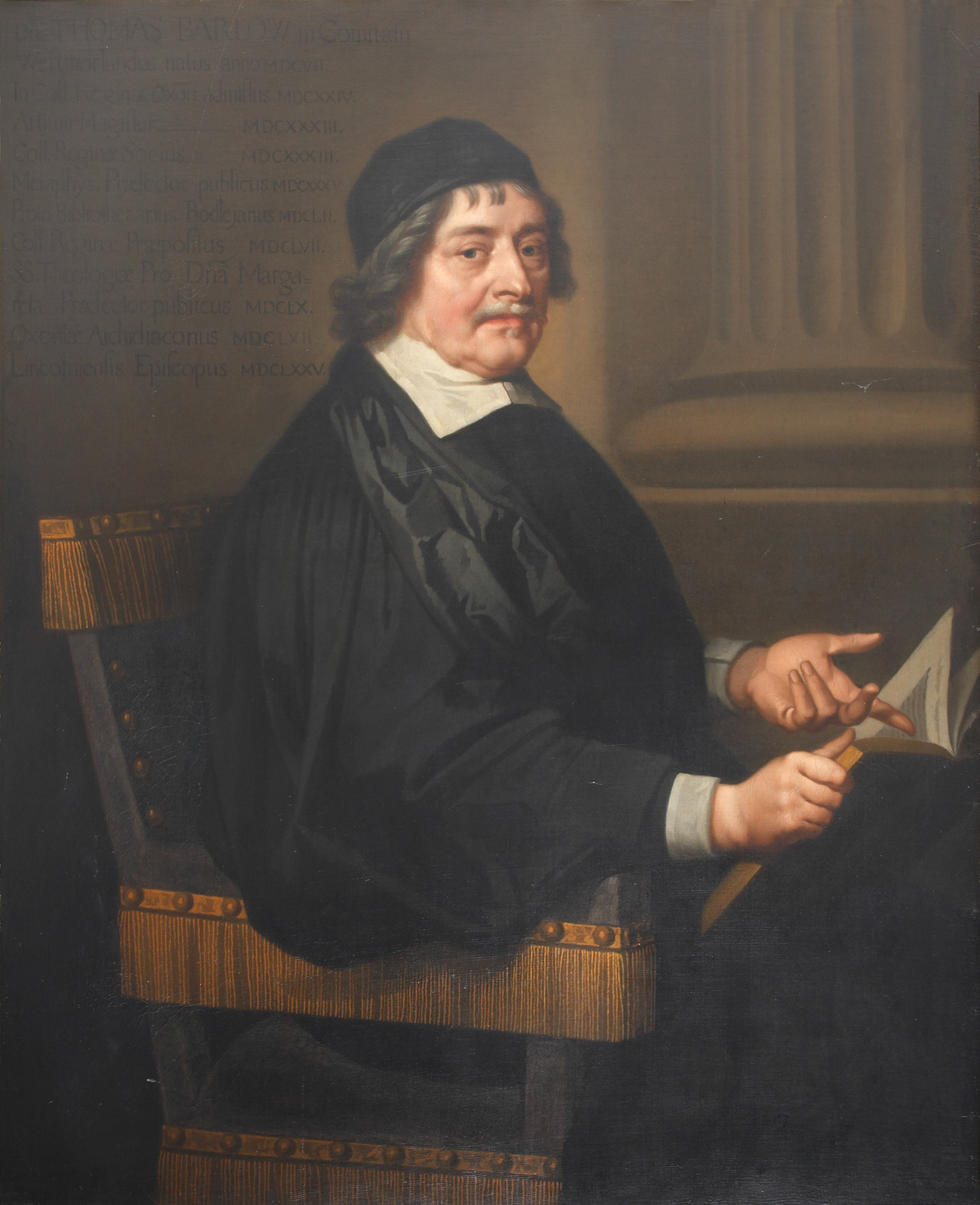
Thomas Barlow, the third librarian

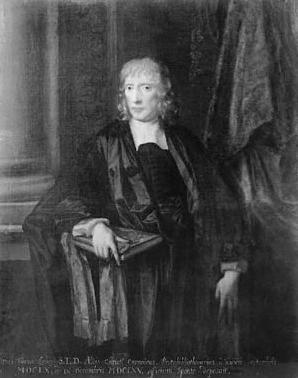
Thomas Lockey, the fourth man to be Bodley's Librarian

The librarians' affiliations with the colleges of the University of Oxford are given, marked with (A) for alumni and (F) for Fellows of the college.

Name	In office	College	Notes
Thomas James	1599–1620	New College (A, F)	James was chosen by Bodley to be the first librarian; the agreement in 1610 with the Stationers' Company that they would provide a copy of each book they printed was his idea.
John Rouse	1620–52	Balliol (A), Oriel (F)	Rouse acquired significant collections of manuscripts for the library during his period in office. During the English Civil War, he followed library rules that prohibited books being borrowed and refused to lend a copy of Histoire universelle by Agrippa d'Aubigné to King Charles I when the king was in Oxford; Charles accepted his refusal with good grace.
Thomas Barlow	1652–60	Queen's (A, F)	Barlow acquired John Selden's collection of books and manuscripts for the library; he resigned upon becoming Lady Margaret Professor of Divinity, and later became Bishop of Lincoln.
Thomas Lockey	1660–65	Christ Church (A, F)	Lockey began, but did not finish, a catalogue of Selden's collection. The 17th-century Oxford antiquarian Anthony Wood described him as "not altogether fit" to be librarian.
Thomas Hyde	1665–1701	Queen's (F)	Hyde was sub-librarian from 1659 until he succeeded Lockey. He later also became Laudian Professor of Arabic and Regius Professor of Hebrew. He resigned from the Bodleian in 1701, tired of "the toil and drudgery of daily attendance in all times and weathers".
John Hudson	1701–19	Queen's (A), University (F)	Hudson worked to expand the collection of the library despite its financial difficulties, donating 600 books personally and persuading authors and publishers to present copies (the Licensing of the Press Act 1662 having lapsed in 1695, removing the library's right to be given books by publishers). Although enthusiastic, "he had a reputation as a negligent if not incapable librarian", with critics noting that Hudson "confused his book business with his responsibilities as librarian".
Joseph Bowles	1719–29	Hart Hall and St Mary Hall (A), Oriel (F)	Bowles was Bodley's Librarian from about age 24 until his death aged 34. He was said to have been "unequal to the position he obtained".
Robert Fysher	1729–47	Christ Church (A), Oriel (A, F)	Fysher won a contested election for the position by 100 votes to 85. He completed the library catalogue begun by Bowles, but ill-health towards the end of his life inhibited his work.
Humphrey Owen	1747–68	Jesus (A, F)	Owen was also elected Principal of Jesus College in 1763, and his successor as Bodley's Librarian, John Price, performed Owen's duties at the Bodleian for at least two years thereafter. Owen worked to improve the Bodleian's facilities, and various important acquisitions were made during his time, including the Rawlinson bequest which was the largest collection of manuscripts to be received from one donor.
John Price	1768–1813	Jesus (A)	Price, who had been acting as librarian during the time of Owen, beat William Cleaver for the position after Owen's death. Although he was Bodley's Librarian for 45 years, Price did not distinguish himself in the role, with the scientist Thomas Beddoes writing to the curators of the library in 1787 to report that Price was guilty of "a regular and constant neglect of his duty", failing to attend the library, lending out books before adding them to the catalogue, a poor choice of books and spending money on the library's rooms rather than books, among other charges.
Bulkeley Bandinel	1813–60	New College (A, F)	Bandinel, Price's godson, had been appointed under-librarian by Price in 1810. Under the autocratic Bandinel, the staff, budget, opening hours and librarian's salary were soon increased, and he presided over significant expansions in the Bodleian's holdings: new books, foreign and early books, manuscripts, and gaps in earlier collections. Over 160,000 items were acquired between 1813 and 1837. He led the publication of a new library catalogue in four volumes in 1843 and 1851, replacing the 1738 edition. Ill health eventually led to his retirement.
Henry Coxe	1860–81	Worcester (A)	Coxe looked to the practices of other libraries to improve the Bodleian, changing the cataloguing system to the "moveable slip" system of the British Museum, adding a second reading room in 1862, obtaining the use of the Radcliffe Camera (which, being lit by gas, could be used in the evenings), and arranging new acquisitions by subject. He was described by one contemporary as "perhaps the most generally known and universally beloved character in Oxford".
Edward Nicholson	1882–1912	Trinity (A)	Nicholson was previously Honorary Librarian of the Oxford Union Society and Principal Librarian and Superintendent of the London Institution. He was a surprise choice as Bodley's Librarian, as the position had traditionally been held by scholar-librarians. Nicholson introduced some reforms, including changing the system of cataloguing and employing boys to carry out some tasks, freeing up the time of the more experienced staff. However, these changes had internal opponents, including Falconer Madan, the senior sub-librarian (and Nicholson's eventual successor). Under Nicholson, the Bodleian's first purpose-built underground book store was constructed; at the time, it was the largest in the world. His last dispute with staff concerned his appointment of a woman to a permanent position. One writer said of him, "I have always regarded him as almost the refounder of the Library."
Falconer Madan	1912–19	Brasenose (A, F)	Madan joined the Bodleian in 1880, cataloguing manuscripts and Latin and Greek language books, and producing a new manuscripts catalogue. His relationship with Nicholson, when Nicholson was the librarian, deteriorated to the point where they only communicated in writing, with Madan criticising Nicholson to others (including in newspapers anonymously). He has been described as "one of the last scholar-librarians" and "the last to be equally at home in the worlds of both manuscripts and printed books".
Sir Arthur Cowley	1919–31	Trinity (A), Magdalen (F)	Cowley, who became a leading Semitic scholar, worked at the Bodleian before spending seven years at the University of Cambridge as Reader in Bibliography. As Bodley's Librarian, he abandoned (for reasons of expense) publication of the catalogue of printed books and began a new catalogue on printed slips for post-1919 publications. He worked towards a united management system for the libraries of the university, with the Bodleian taking over other libraries as dependent institutions. Cowley's preferred option for expansion (additional buildings opposite the library's main site) was eventually accepted just before he retired.
Sir Edmund Craster	1931–45	Balliol (A), All Souls (F)	Craster became sub-librarian in 1912, and was also Keeper of Western Manuscripts from 1927. After leaving the Bodleian, he became the librarian of All Souls College in 1946, and wrote a history of the Bodleian in 1952.
Harry Creswick	1945–47	Christ Church (F)	Creswick moved from the Cambridge University Library in 1939 to be deputy librarian of the Bodleian Library; after leaving Oxford in 1947, he returned to Cambridge as University Librarian in 1949.
Nowell Myres	1948–65	New College (A), Christ Church (F)	Myres was the librarian at Christ Church from 1938, and a noted historian and administrator. During his time as Bodley's Librarian, he oversaw the integration of the New Bodleian extension built in 1939 with the main library, and significant structural work to, and reordering of, the original buildings. The Bodleian Law Library was opened in 1964. He resigned when the university authorities refused to give the premises of the Indian Institute to the Bodleian.
Robert Shackleton	1966–79	Oriel (A), Brasenose (F)	Shackleton, a modern languages scholar, was librarian of Brasenose College from 1948 to 1966 and one of the Bodleian's curators from 1961, chairing an Oxford committee on the university's libraries from 1965 to 1966. As Bodley's Librarian, he promoted the sharing between libraries of automated techniques to catalogue books. His management style, however, did not fit with the practicalities of university finance and the increasing demands of library users, and he resigned to become Marshal Foch Professor of French Literature at All Souls College.
Richard Fifoot	1979–81	Exeter (F)	Fifoot had previously worked at the libraries of the Universities of Leeds and Nottingham, and spent 19 years as librarian of the University of Edinburgh before moving to the Bodleian.
John Jolliffe	1982–85	Nuffield (F)	Jolliffe worked at the British Museum before becoming Keeper of Catalogues at the Bodleian in 1970, and was involved in the development of the use of computers in the Bodleian. He died aged 55 after a short illness.
David Vaisey	1986–96	Exeter (A, F)	Vaisey worked at the Bodleian from 1963 onwards, becoming Keeper of Western Manuscripts in 1975. On his retirement, he was given the title "Bodley's Librarian Emeritus", and was Keeper of the Archives of the university between 1995 and 2000.
Reginald Carr	1997–2006	Balliol (F)	Carr was previously librarian of the University of Leeds. At Oxford, he set up Oxford University Library Services (now renamed "Bodleian Libraries") to integrate the university's centrally funded libraries, and was its first director. Other work during his time as Bodley's Librarian included setting up the Oxford Digital Library, extending the scope of legal deposit to cover electronic publications, and significant work on buildings and fundraising. He was the second person, after his immediate predecessor David Vaisey, to be given the title "Bodley's Librarian Emeritus" on retirement.
Sarah Thomas	2007–13	Balliol (F)	Thomas, the first foreigner and first woman appointed to the position, was previously librarian of Cornell University (1996–2007), and has worked at Harvard University and the Library of Congress. She was a Professorial Fellow of Balliol College. She returned to Harvard as vice president for the Harvard Library in 2013.
Richard Ovenden	2014 onwards	Balliol (F)	Ovenden joined the Bodleian Library in 2003 as Keeper of Special Collections and Western Manuscripts. Formerly a Professorial Fellow of St Hugh's College, he is now a Fellow of Balliol.
