= Denise Newman =

Denise Newman may refer to:

- Denise Newman (diver)
- Denise Newman (actress)
