= Sarah Thomas (librarian) =

American librarian

Sarah Elizabeth Thomas is an American librarian best known for her leadership positions in a number of research libraries. In May 2013 it was announced that she had been appointed vice president for Harvard University Library; she took up the post in August 2013.

== Early life ==
Thomas was raised in Haydenville, Massachusetts, United States, and graduated from Smith College in 1970. She qualified as a professional librarian at Simmons College in 1973 and received her Ph.D. from Johns Hopkins University in 1982 for a thesis on the Austrian author Hugo von Hofmannsthal and his relations with his publisher.

== Career ==
Between 1996 and 2006, Thomas held the positions of adjunct professor of German and Carl A. Kroch University Librarian at Cornell University. At Cornell, her tenure was marked by a vigorous growth of the Library's digital collection. Thomas led multiple initiatives that helped Cornell to offer most the most modern services and amenities to users. Under her leadership the library expanded significantly, new buildings were constructed and existing ones were renovated.

Between 2007 and 2013, she held the office of Bodley's Librarian and Director of the Bodleian Libraries at the University of Oxford. As Bodley's Librarian, she was responsible for the operation of the largest university libraries in the United Kingdom, and one of the major research libraries in the world. Her previous experience in major United States research libraries included Harvard's Widener Library, Johns Hopkins, the National Agricultural Library, the Library of Congress, and the Research Libraries Group.

== Accomplishments ==
She is the first woman to have held the position of Bodley's Librarian, and the second librarian (after her predecessor, Reginald Carr) also to have been in charge of the university's integrated library service (known as "Oxford University Library Services" when it was established in 2000, but renamed "Bodleian Libraries" on March 2, 2010 – Bodley's 465th birthday). Thomas, an American, is also the first foreign librarian to have run the Bodleian. In an interview she gave shortly after taking up the position, she recalled visiting Oxford when she was working at the Library of Congress to speak at the Sheldonian Theatre. She said that she remembered thinking "I could just die then and be happy". When recruitment consultants approached her about applying for the post and she saw the job description, she said, "it was love at first sight. It was everything I wanted to do, but bigger. Integration, the digital library, the estates programme, the opportunity to be inside a truly magnificent institution and have a role at a pivotal moment in its history – that was just too enticing for me."

In 2007, Thomas was awarded the Melvil Dewey Medal by the American Library Association, and in 2010 was awarded the Smith College Medal. She was elected a Member of the American Philosophical Society in 2013.

She is a Trustee of the Natural History Museum, OCLC, and Historic Deerfield.

== Personal life ==
Thomas is married to Peter B. Hirtle, an archivist. They have two sons.
