= Edward Nicholson (librarian) =

British author and Bodley's Librarian

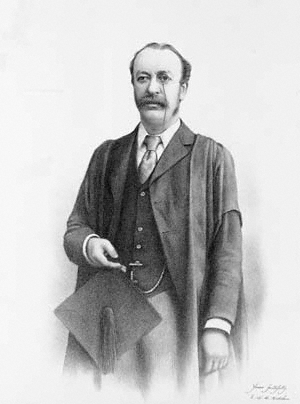
- Born: Edward Williams Byron Nicholson; 16 March 1849; St. Helier, Jersey
- Died: 17 March 1912 (aged 63); Oxford, England
- Occupations: Author, librarian
- Spouse: Helen Grant (m. 1876)
- Children: 3

Edward Williams Byron Nicholson (16 March 1849 – 17 March 1912) was a British author and Bodley's Librarian. He was the head of the Bodleian Library at the University of Oxford, from 1882 until his death in 1912. Nicholson was also an early advocate of animal rights.

== Early life and career ==
Nicholson was born in St. Helier, Jersey. His father, a former member of the Royal Navy, participated in the California Gold Rush and died in America, leaving Nicholson's mother in poverty. She moved back to her mother's house in Llanrwst, north Wales. Nicholson was educated at Llanrwst Grammar School, Liverpool College (for one term) and Tonbridge School. He studied at Trinity College, Oxford, from 1867, initially reading classics before obtaining a third-class degree in Law and Modern History in 1871. During his time at Oxford, he won the Gaisford Prize for Greek Verse in 1871 and the Hall-Houghton Junior Greek Testament Prize in 1872. Nicholson married Helen Grant on 1 February 1876; they had three daughters.

Nicholson had been the librarian at Tonbridge School and was the honorary Librarian of the Oxford Union Society from 1872 to 1873, and produced catalogues of the contents of each library, demonstrating his aptitude for cataloguing. After spending some time teaching, he became Principal Librarian and Superintendent of the London Institution in 1873. He reinvigorated the organisation, which promoted education through lectures and a library, and helped to increase its activities, membership and income, as well as the quality of its library. An international conference of librarians was held in London in 1877, largely through his work, leading with his help to the foundation of the Library Association of the United Kingdom. He was a council member until 1881, when he resigned complaining that the council had failed to instigate "one single improvement however trifling in library-management or library-appliances".

== Oxford ==
Bodley's Librarian (the head of the Bodleian Library at the University of Oxford), Henry Octavius Coxe, died in 1881. Nicholson applied for the post, relying on his experience as a librarian and his organisational skills to compensate his lack of experience in palaeography, bibliography and languages. He was a surprise choice, as the position had traditionally been held by scholar-librarians, but he had the support of Benjamin Jowett (Vice-Chancellor of the University from 1882 and Master of Balliol College) and others who thought that the Bodleian needed reform. The library was cramped, under-staffed and poorly catalogued, but was still regarded as one of the leading libraries in the world. Nicholson instituted a number of reforms and improvements: he obtained further space for the library in the rooms of nearby buildings; he changed the system of cataloguing; more books were acquired; open access to some reference books in the Radcliffe Camera was introduced; and boys were employed to carry out some tasks, freeing up the time of the more experienced staff. However, these changes had internal opponents, including Falconer Madan, the senior Sub-Librarian (and Nicholson's eventual successor). The battles between Nicholson and some of his staff, which included anonymous complaints in newspapers, were an ongoing problem and affected Nicholson's health. One writer, however, later said of Nicholson, "I have always regarded him as almost the refounder of the Library".

The library continued to suffer from inadequate space and money, but Nicholson made the most of the building and his staff, even though increasing the number of books added pressure on the available space. Nicholson proposed an underground book store in 1899 and work on this (the first specially-constructed underground book store to be built), along with other expansion work, began in 1907. However, by this time, his struggles and hard work had affected his health: he was confirmed as suffering from heart disease in 1890, he had a breakdown in 1901, and collapsed in the street in 1907 on two occasions. His last dispute with staff concerned his decision to appoint a woman to a permanent position. He was very reluctant to take a leave of absence from the library, suspecting motivations behind the suggestions, but finally did so less than a month before his death.

Outside the library, he enjoyed chess, swimming, cycling, and writing limericks. He was noted for his kindness and consideration, and was particularly appreciated by junior staff at the library.

He died at home in Oxford on 17 March 1912.

== Animal rights ==
Nicholson was an early advocate of animal rights. He argued in his book, The Rights of an Animal (1879) that animals have the same natural right to life and liberty that human beings do, disregarding Descartes' mechanistic view—or what he called the "Neo-Cartesian snake"—that they lack consciousness. He argued that animals having no powers of reason is inconsistent with observations of household pets. Nicholson noted that animals like people, have nervous systems and experience pain and pleasure. He concluded that "animals have the same abstract rights of life and personal liberty with man."

Nicholson dedicated the book to Arthur Helps and John Lawrence. It contains a reprint of Lawrence's chapter "The Rights of Beasts".

The book was criticized in the Nature journal, in 1879. The reviewer commented that "animals, as sentient creatures, have some rights—i.e., that man may not kill or torture them needlessly without incurring some moral blame—no one nowadays would undertake to dispute. It therefore seems useless to fill, a number of pages with a number of truisms on the theme that animals have some rights in common with man."

== Publications ==
Nicholson published on various topics, such as classical literature and Celtic antiquities. His writings included:

- The Christ-Child, and other poems, 1877.
- The Rights of an Animal, 1879.
- The Bodleian Library in 1882–1887, 1888.
- Golspie, contributions to its folklore, collected and edited by Edward WB Nicholson London, 1897.
- The Gospel according to the Hebrews, 1879.
- Keltic Researches: Studies in the History and Distribution of the Ancient Goidelic Language and People. London, 1904.
- "The Vandals in Wessex", 1906.
- Can We Not Save Architecture in Oxford?, 1910.
