= Bulkeley Bandinel =

19th-century English priest and librarian

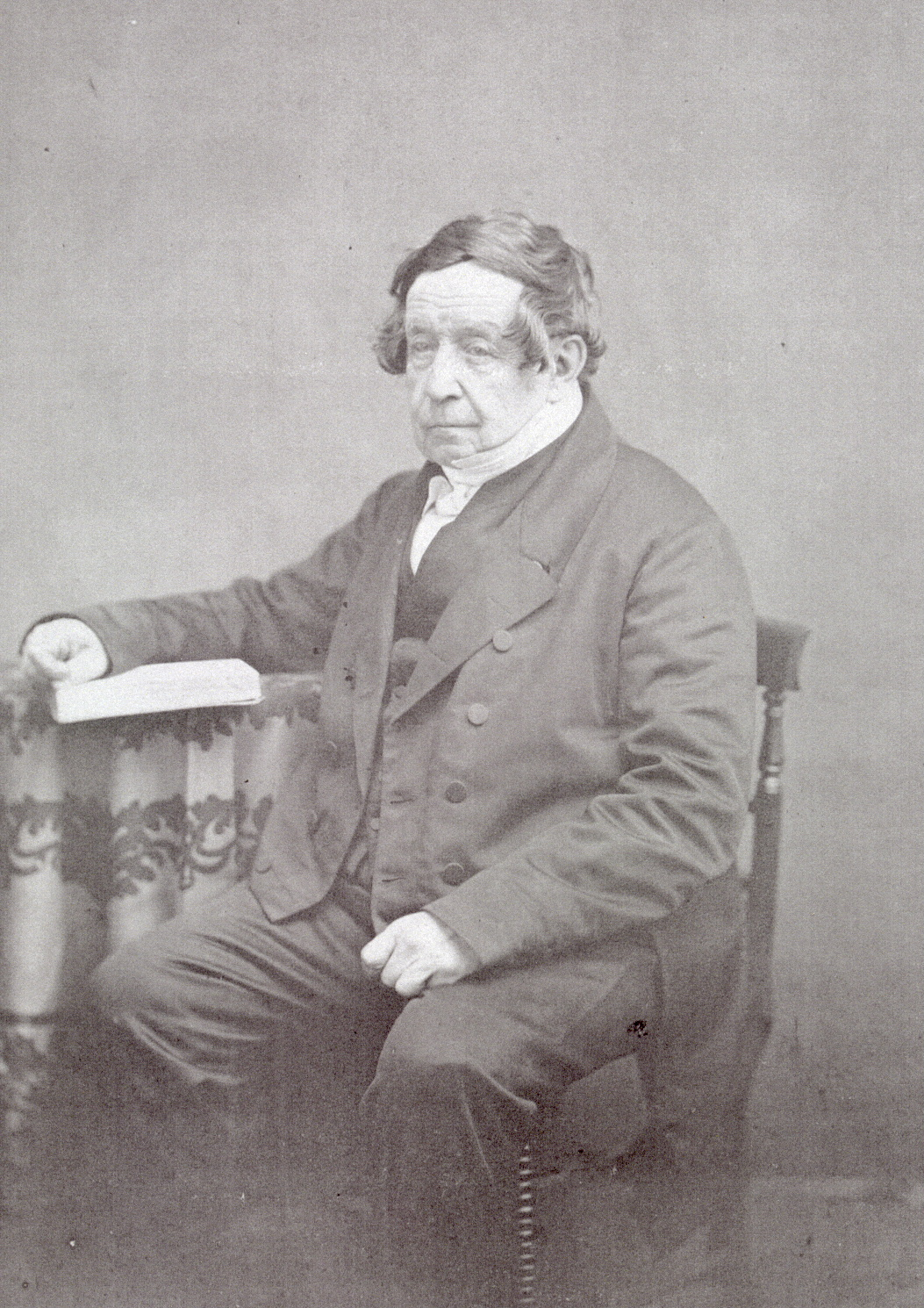
- Bulkeley Bandinel
- Born: 21 February 1781; St Peter-in-the-East, Oxford, England
- Died: February 6, 1861 (aged 79); Oxford, England
- Burial place: St Sepulchre's Cemetery, Oxford
- Father: James Bandinel of Netherbury

Bulkeley Bandinel (21 February 1781 – 6 February 1861) was a British scholar, ecclesiastic and librarian.

== Early life ==
He was born in the parish of St Peter-in-the-East, Oxford, first-born son of Rev. Dr. James Bandinel of Netherbury by his wife, Margaret (née Dumaresq). His ancestors, originally from Italy, had moved to Jersey early in the seventeenth century. His father was the first of the family to settle in England. Bulkeley was named after his father's friend, Viscount Bulkeley of Cashel.

Educated at Reading under Richard Valpy and then at Winchester College, Bandinel entered New College, Oxford, in 1800 (B.A. 1805, M.A. 1807, B.D. and D.D. 1823) and was a Fellow there until 1813. He was ordained as a priest in the Church of England in 1805.

== Career ==
During Admiral Sir James Saumarez's Baltic campaign of 1808, Bandinel served a short while as chaplain on board HMS Victory. Returning, he settled in Oxford and rose within the university's ranks. From 1810 he was Sub-Librarian of the Bodleian Library under his godfather John Price, and rose to become Bodley's Librarian in 1813 upon Price's death. It was a position he held until his own death in 1861. Bandinel was Dean of New College and Proctor of the university in 1814, and a Delegate of the University Press from 1813.

In addition, his clerical posts included curacies at nearby Wytham from 1816, and at Albury, Oxfordshire, from 1820. In 1822 he was promoted to the rectory of St Andrew's Church, Haughton-le-Skerne formerly held by his brother-in-law, Thomas Le Mesurier. But Bandinel, occupied with administering the Bodleian and paying from his own purse for bold acquisitions of rare books and manuscripts, rarely visited his living in the North and the parish was run by a curate in his place.

The Bodleian's collections increased greatly under his direction and his knowledge of literary circles was rarely seconded. His patience with both ill-informed library visitors and colleagues would often run thin, many a guest falling victim to his short temper, but it is said that his courtesy was guaranteed to anyone of note who wished to consult him. He was one of the three contributors to Collectanea Topographica et Genealogica.

Macray in his Annals of the Bodleian Library recounts that Bandinel resigned his librarianship in 1860 "after forty-seven years of office as in the capacity of Head, and a total of fifty of work in the Library... At the age of seventy-nine the natural infirmities of age were felt by himself to incapacitate him for the duties which he had so long and so regularly discharged; while at the same time the continually increasing pressure of work and requirements of the Library made those duties much more onerous than they had been even a quarter of a century before." He gave way to his subordinate, Henry Octavius Coxe.

== Personal life ==
Bandinel married Mary Phillips, daughter of John Phillips of Culham, Oxfordshire in 1813. He died in 1861 at his home in Oxford and was buried in St Sepulchre's Cemetery there.
