= C. H. S. Fifoot =

British legal scholar (1899–1975)

Cecil Herbert Stuart Fifoot FBA (1899 – 31 January 1975) was a British legal scholar. A fellow of Hertford College, Oxford, from 1924 to 1959, he was known for his works on English legal history and for his textbook on English contract law, commonly known as Cheshire and Fifoot's Law of Contract, now in its seventeenth edition.

== Life and career ==
Cecil Fifoot was born in Penarth, near Cardiff, the son of Sydney Fifoot, manager of the Great Western Colliery Company, and of Maria Trevor. He was educated at Berkhamsted School, before being commissioned into the Royal Field Artillery in 1917, aged 18. He was sent with a mortar unit to France, where he was injured in July 1918, leaving him partially deaf, and spent the rest of the war in hospital.

In 1919, Fifoot entered Exeter College, Oxford, with the original intent to study history before switching to jurisprudence. He studied under Geoffrey Cheshire, with whom he later co-authored an influential work on the law of contract. Fifoot took first-class honours in Jurisprudence in 1921 and was called to the bar at the Middle Temple in 1922. He began to practice in South Wales, before giving up legal practice in 1924 and accepting a tutorial fellowship at Hertford College, Oxford, where he remained a fellow until his retirement 1959. Among his students were Carl Albert and Sir Ian Brownlie.

Fifoot was a renowned lecturer; his lectures were said to be so popular that it was common practice for the windows of the Old Hall of Lincoln's Inn to be opened when he was lecturing there, so as to allow those standing outside to hear him. At Oxford, he was University Lecturer in Law from 1930 until 1945, when he was appointed All Souls Reader in English Law. He was also Reader in Common Law to the Inns of Court from 1954 to 1967. He delivered the Hamlyn Lectures in 1959 and the David Murray Lecture at Glasgow University in 1970.

In addition, Fifoot was Oxford's Senior Proctor from 1935 to 1936, Bursar of Hertford College from 1926 to 1934, and Dean from 1940 to 1944. He was elected a Fellow of the British Academy in 1954 and an honorary fellow of Hertford College in 1962.

In 1959 Fifoot retired to Eastbourne, but continued to lecture for the Inns of Court until 1967. He moved to Edinburgh in 1969, where he died in 1975.

=== Family ===
Fifoot married Hjördis Baars, younger daughter of Dr Eriksen of Kongsberg, Norway, in 1924. Their only son, Richard Fifoot, was Bodley's Librarian from 1979 to 1981.

== Scholarship ==
Fifoot was known as a historian of English law. An admirer of F. W. Maitland, Fifoot authored a biography of Maitland (Frederic William Maitland: A Life, 1971) and edited his letters for the Selden Society. He also wrote two monographs on the development of English law and a biography of Lord Mansfield.

Fifoot was also an important contract law scholar. His textbook on the English contract law, The Law of Contract (1946), co-authored with his former tutor Geoffrey Cheshire, quickly became a leading textbook on the subject. Originally known as Cheshire and Fifoot's Law of Contract, it is now in its seventeenth edition (2017) as Cheshire, Fifoot, and Furmston's Law of Contract.

== Publications ==
- English Law and its Background, 1932
- Lord Mansfield, 1936
- The Law of Contract (with Dr G. C. Cheshire), 1945, 8th edition 1972
- Cases on the Law of Contract (with Dr G. C. Cheshire), 1945, 6th edition 1973
- History and Sources of the Common Law, 1949
- Law and History in the 19th Century: Selden Society Lecture Delivered in The Hall of the Middle Temple on 13th March 1956. London: Bernard Quaritch. 1956 – via Internet Archive.
- Judge and Jurist in the Reign of Victoria (the 1959 Hamlyn Lectures). London: Stevens and Sons Limited. 1959 – via Internet Archive.
- C. H. S. Fifoot, ed. (1965). The Letters of Frederic William Maitland. Cambridge University Press: Cambridge University Press and the Selden Society – via Internet Archive.
- Pollock and Maitland, 1970 (the 31st David Murray Lecture at Glasgow University)
- Frederic William Maitland: A Life. Cambridge, Massachusetts: Harvard University Press. 1971. ISBN 978-0-674-31825-0 – via Internet Archive.
