= Edinburgh University Library =

Library of the University of Edinburgh

Coordinates: 55.9428°N 3.1890°W

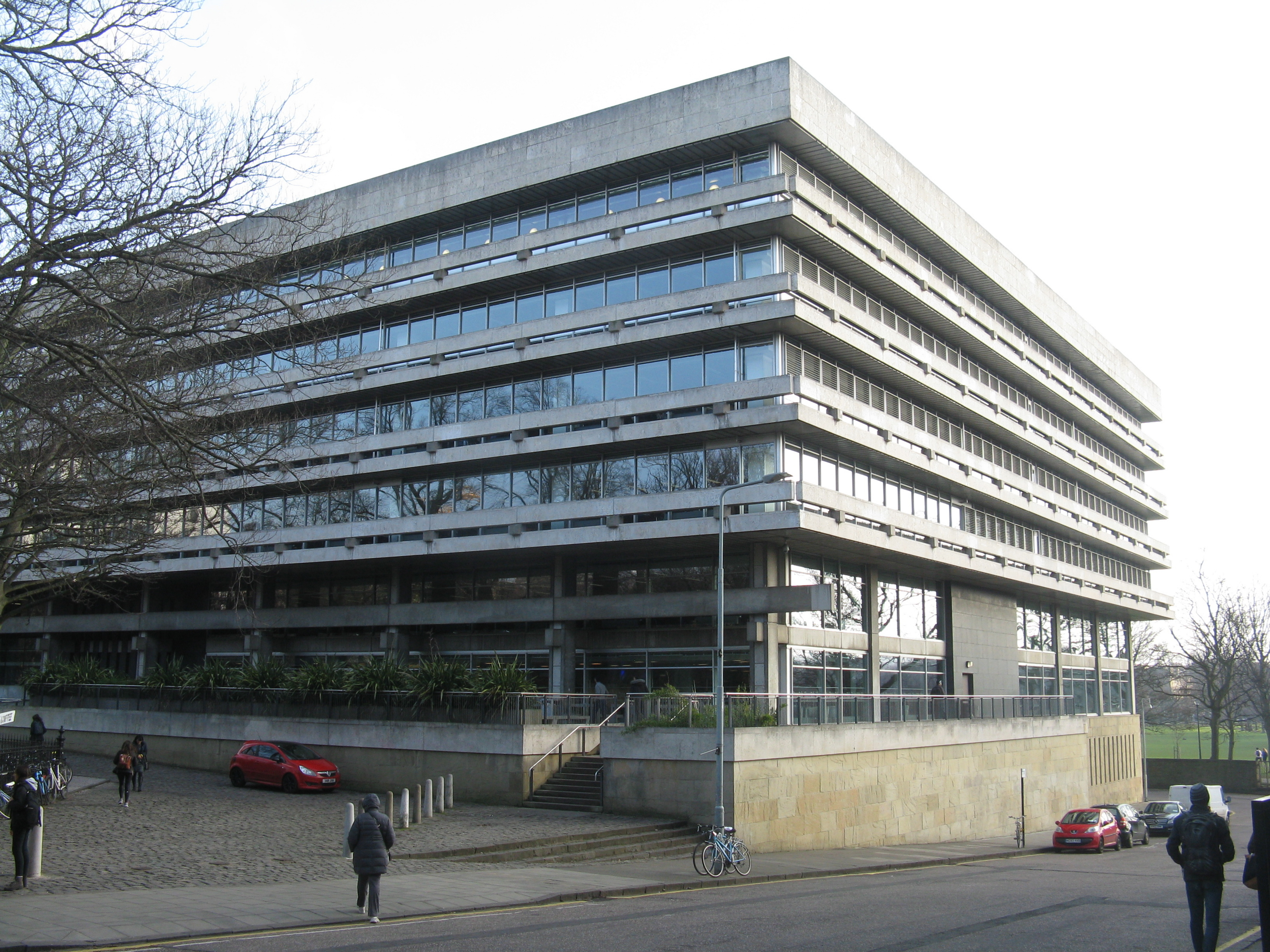
Edinburgh University Main Library

Edinburgh University Library is the main library of the University of Edinburgh and one of the most important libraries of Scotland. The University Library was moved in 1827 to William Playfair's Upper Library in the Old College building. The collections in Edinburgh University Old College were moved in 1967 to the purpose-built eight-storey Main Library building at George Square, one of the largest academic libraries in the world. Today, Edinburgh's university-wide library system holds over 3.8m books, e-books and e-journals in total.

== History ==
The university was founded by Royal Charter from King James VI in 1582 and opened in 1583, however the library pre-dated this by three years. The initial collection was a bequest of 276 theological books from Clement Littill, an advocate who left his collection to the town in 1580. Until 1708, the teaching staff consisted of four regents and the Principal, the former taking each class through a year's part of the whole arts curriculum of logic, metaphysics, ethics and physics, which included the elements of mathematics and astronomy. Until the middle of the 17th century, by which time the library must have exceeded the 2,400-odd volumes listed in Robert Lumsden's shelf catalogue of 1637, the teaching tended to be commentaries on Aristotle.

== Collections ==
The Heritage Collections Department has about 200,000 items in all branches of knowledge. There are 1,200 incunabula, about 9,000 printed books from 16th century, 35,000 from the 17th and 18th centuries, and 60,000 from the 19th century. An important part of this collection is German Reformation tracts.

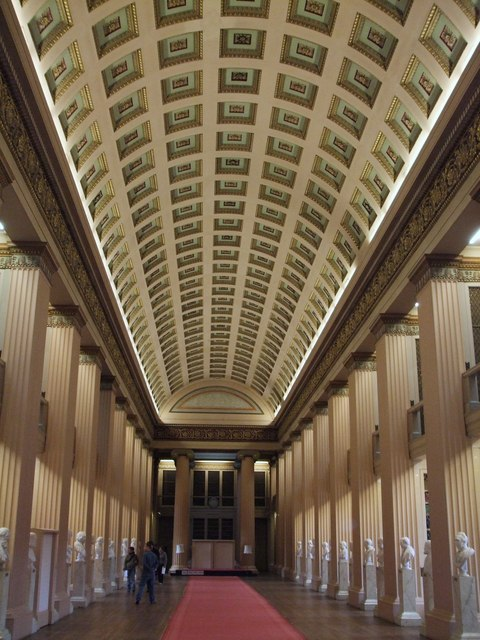
Playfair Library

Exterior of the University Main Library in George Square

Lego Main Library (360° video)

Among the many collections of the library are two which were formerly in the possession of the 19th-century Shakespearian scholar James Halliwell-Phillipps. The first collection was acquired by the library between 1872 and 1889, including a Shakespearian collection. The second collection was acquired in 1964 by purchase from Sotheby's.

The University of Edinburgh is also the host of a research project in conjunction with the British Library and ATILF called The Making of the Queen's Manuscript, which focuses on Christine de Pizan's Harley MS 4431. The project is housed "partly in the French section of the School of Literatures, Languages and Cultures, partly in the Special Collections department of Edinburgh University Library (EUL)" under the supervision of the Project Director, Dr. James Laidlaw and the Project Officer, Dr. Andrew Grout, the Special Collections Digital Library Officer.

== Main Library building ==
The Main Library is situated on the south-west corner of George Square, chosen because this was the quietest section of the square. Opened in 1967, the eight-storey building was designed by J.M.Marshall and Andrew Merrylees of Spence, Glover and Ferguson, The horizontal library exterior is deliberately designed to look like a bookcase; the architecture features brutalist elements but also clear oriental features. The exterior columns on the north side feature bracketing and are non-weight bearing. Upon opening, it was the largest university library in the UK, with each floor an acre in size. Today the Main Library is a category A listed building whose design influenced several other university libraries such as those at University of Glasgow, Newcastle Central Library, and University College Dublin.

== Librarians of the University of Edinburgh ==
The current Librarian to the University of Edinburgh is Gavin McLachlan. The current Director of Library and University Collections is Jeremy Upton. Previous Directors, Keepers and Librarians to the University include: Kenneth Logie, Andrew Munro, Thomas Spier, Andrew Suttie, Francis Adamson, James Nairne, John Mien, John Stevenson, John Kniland, John Dunlop, William Somerville, William Henderson, Robert Henderson, George Stuart, James Robertson, Andrew Dalzel, George Dunbar, Andrew Duncan, Alexander Brunton, John Small, Hugh Webster, Alexander Anderson, Frank Carr Nicholson, Lauriston William Sharp, Erik Richard Sidney Fifoot, Brenda Moon and Ian Mowat, Sheila Cannell, and Dr John Scally.

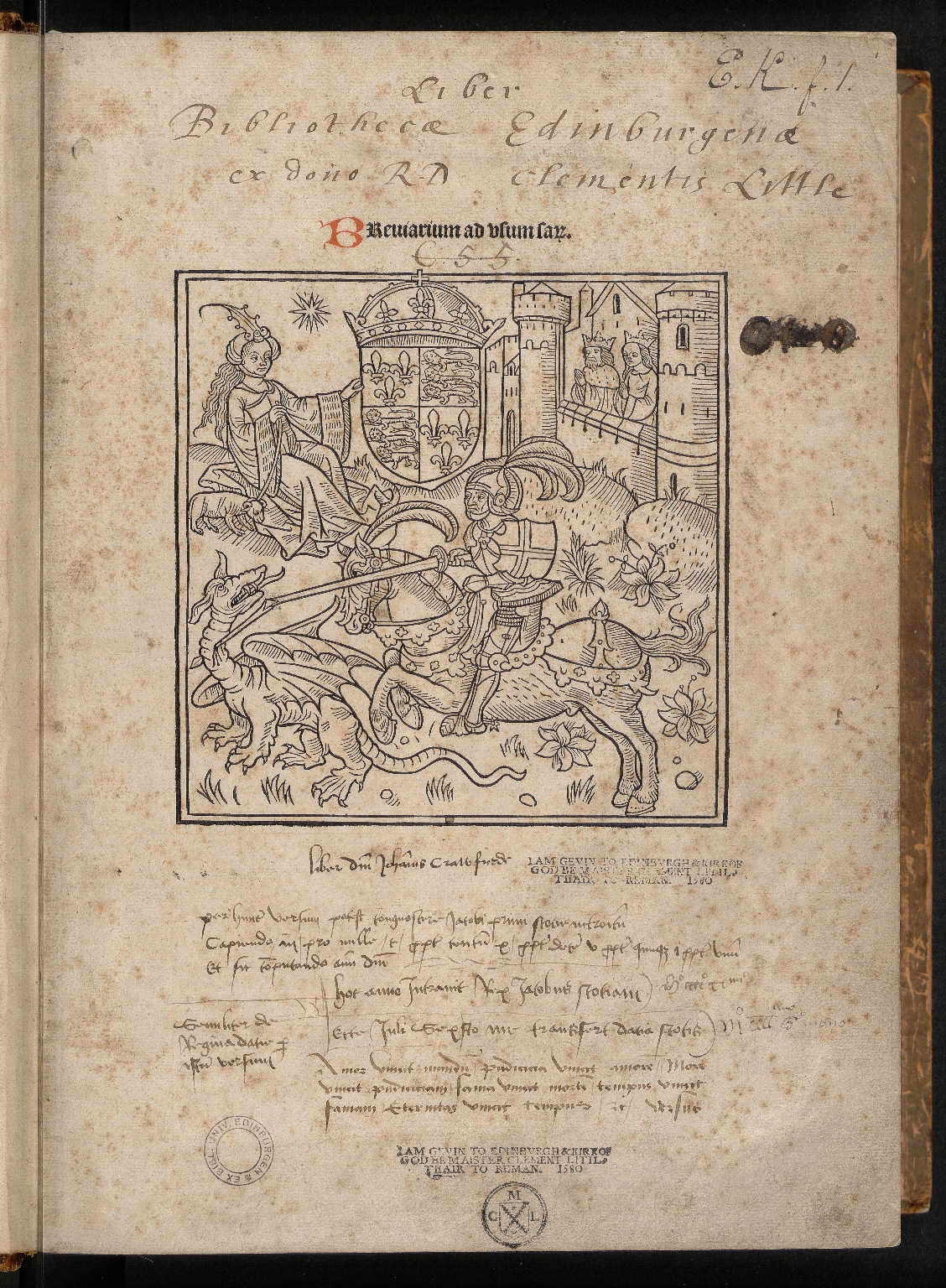
Page from Brevarium Sarum, donated to the library by Clement Litill.

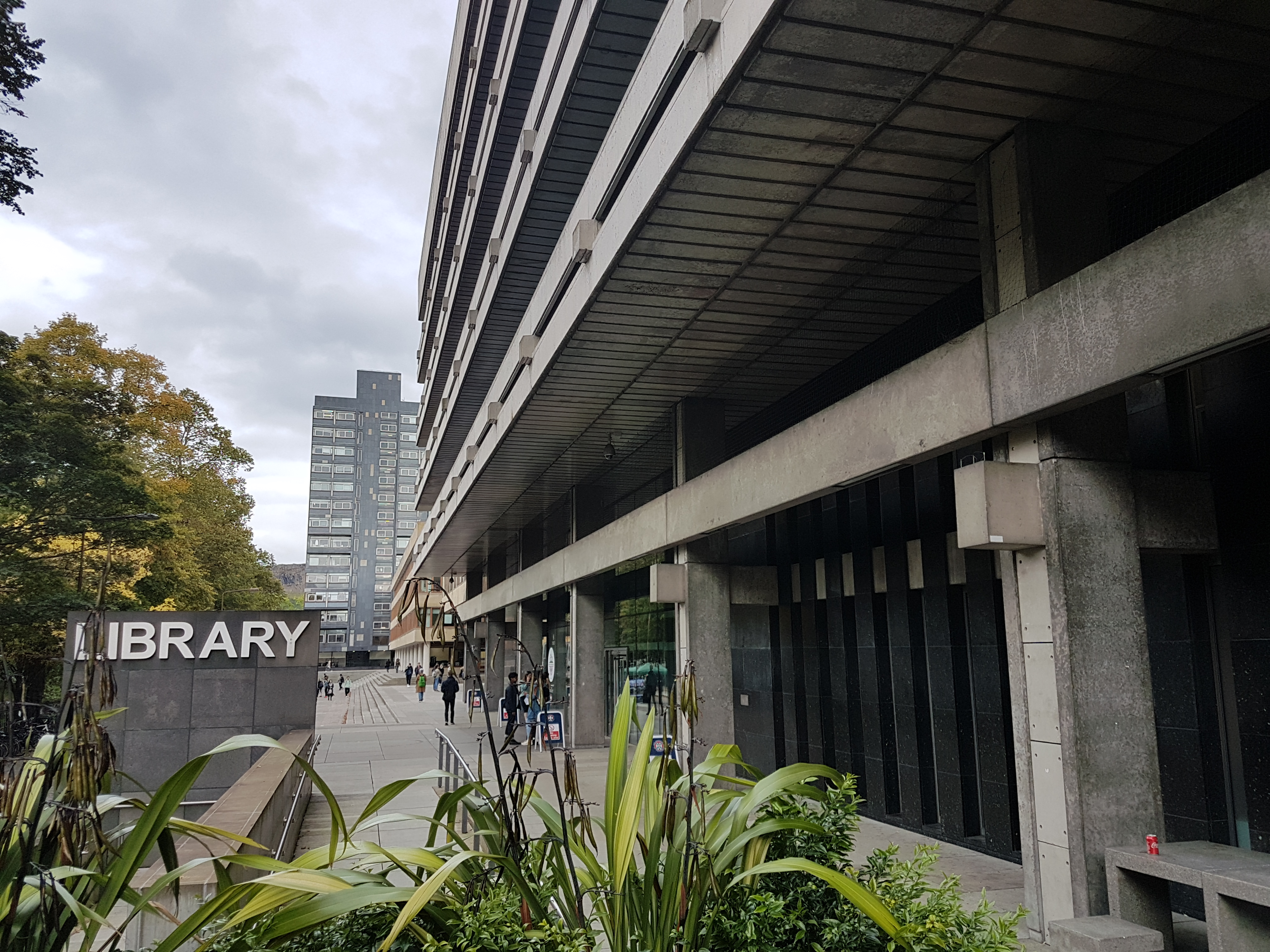
University of Edinburgh Main Library.

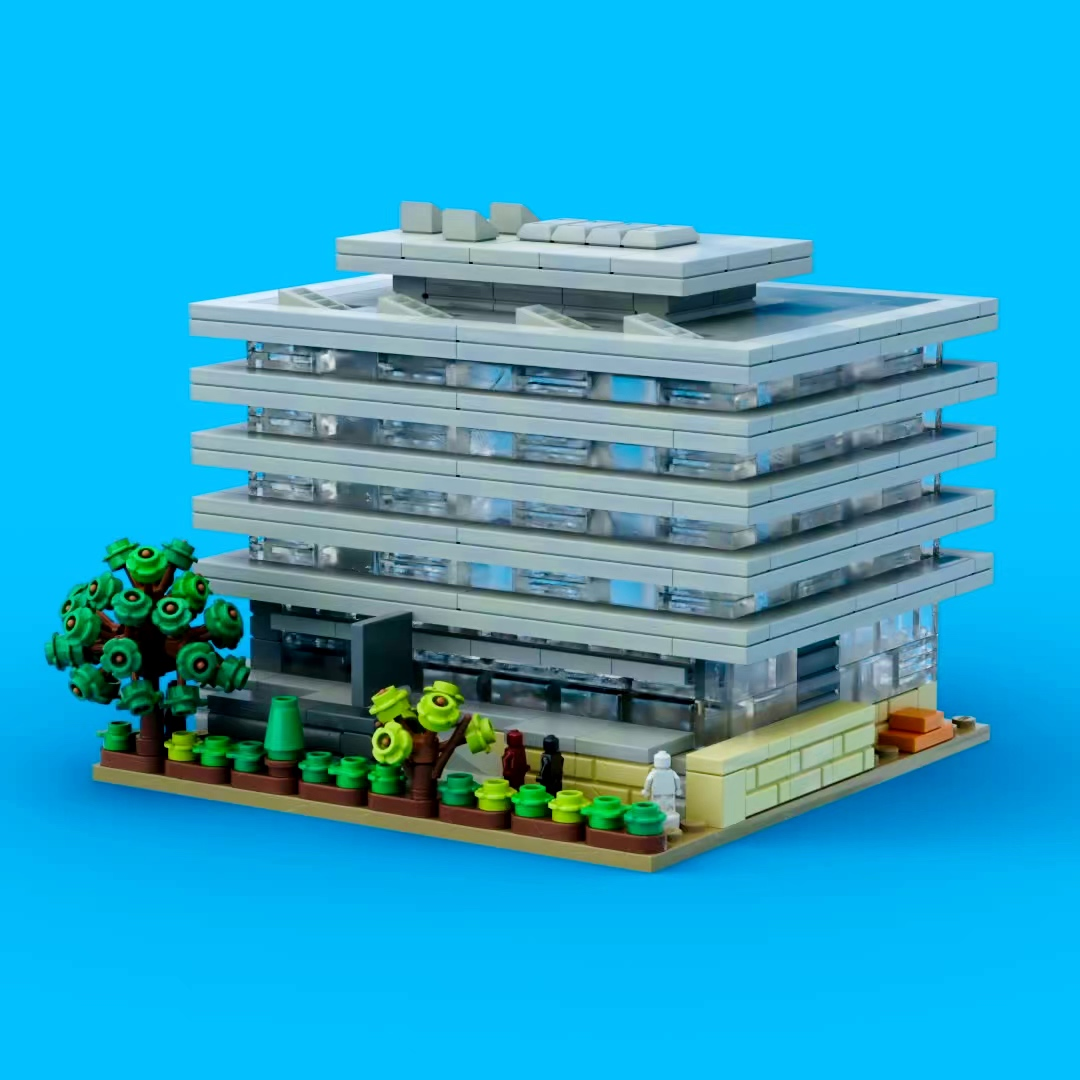
Detailed Lego model of the University Main Library

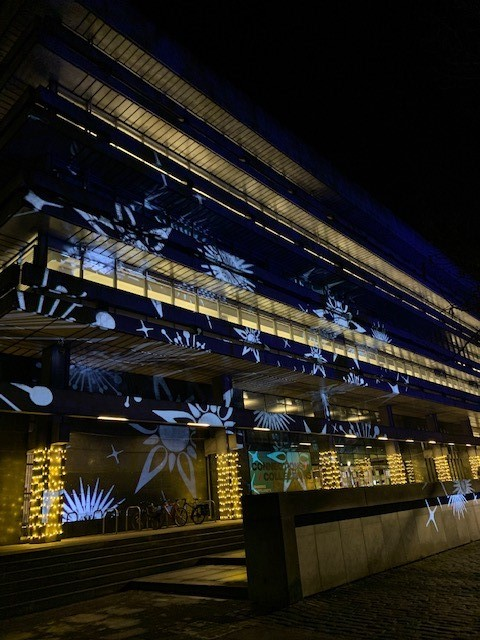
Exterior of University main library

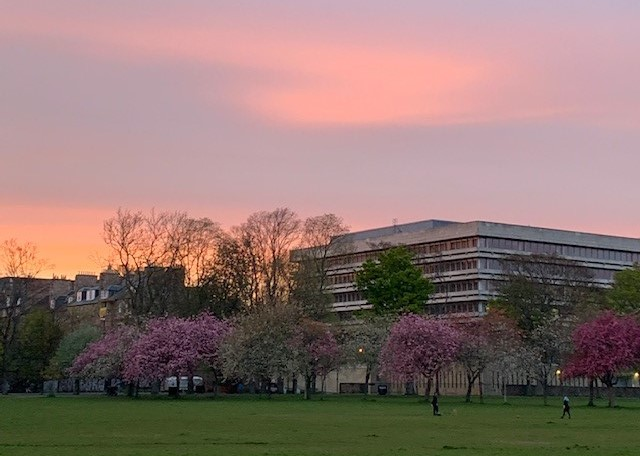
University of Edinburgh Main Library, photographed from The Meadows.

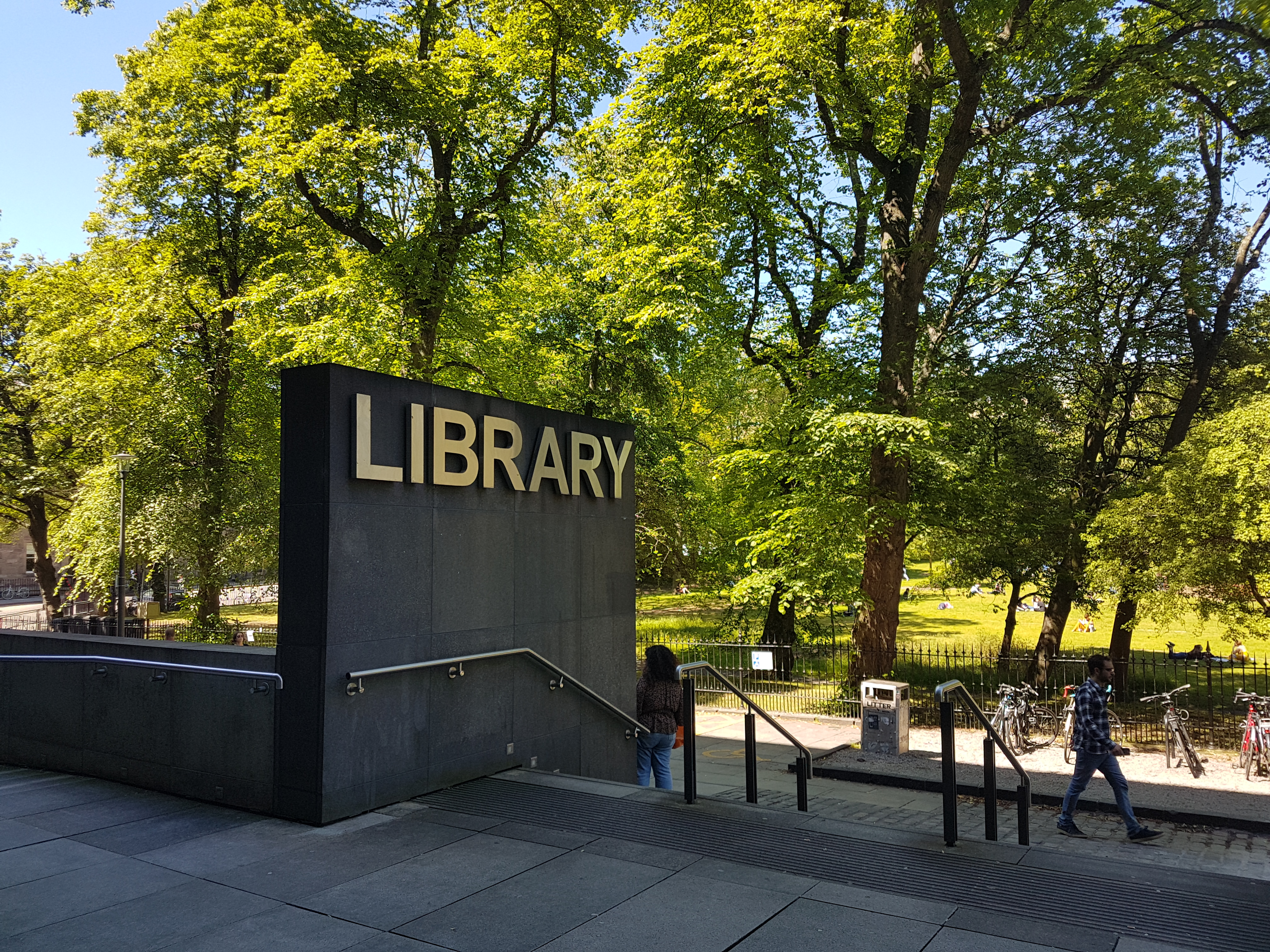
Library main entrance.

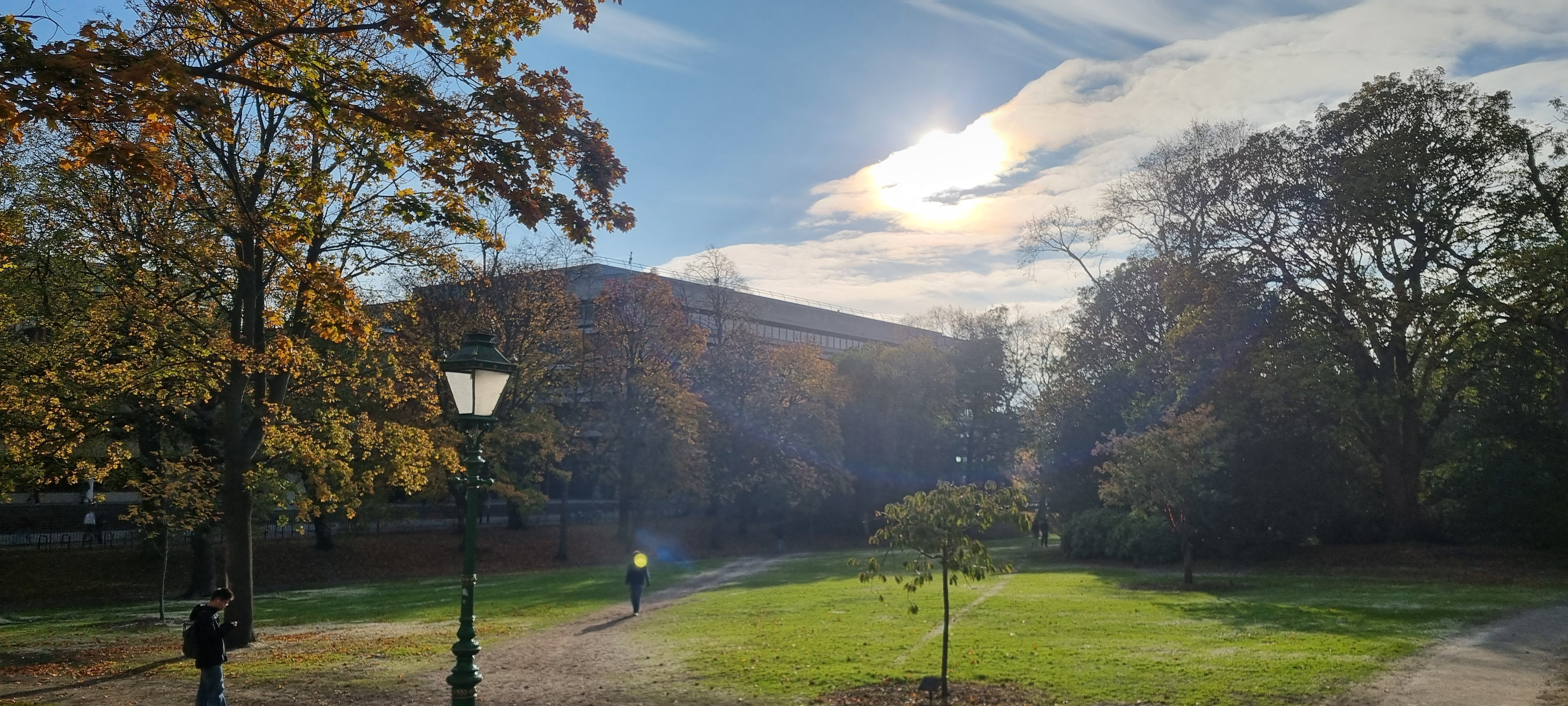
University of Edinburgh Main Library in autumn sun

== See also ==
- University of Edinburgh
