= Harry Creswick =

Harry Richardson Creswick (1902 – 14 October 1988) was a British librarian who was head of the university libraries at both Oxford and Cambridge.

== Life ==
Creswick was born in 1902 and educated at Queen Elizabeth's Grammar School, Barnet before studying at Trinity College, Cambridge.

He joined the staff of the Cambridge University Library in 1926 and worked there until 1938. In the following year, he moved to the University of Oxford as Deputy Librarian of the Bodleian Library.

In 1939 he held the Sandars Readership in Bibliography at Cambridge University lecturing on "Some recent work on early English printed books."

In 1945, he succeeded Edmund Craster as Bodley's Librarian (the head of the library); he was also a Fellow of Christ Church, Oxford.

Creswick left the Bodleian in 1947 and in 1949 returned to Cambridge as Librarian of the University and a Fellow of Jesus College, Cambridge.

He retired in 1967, and died on 14 October 1988.

Academic offices
Preceded by A.F. Scholfield	University Librarian (Cambridge); 1923–1949	Succeeded by Eric Bertrand Ceadel
