= Marshal Foch Professor of French Literature =

Professorship at the University of Oxford

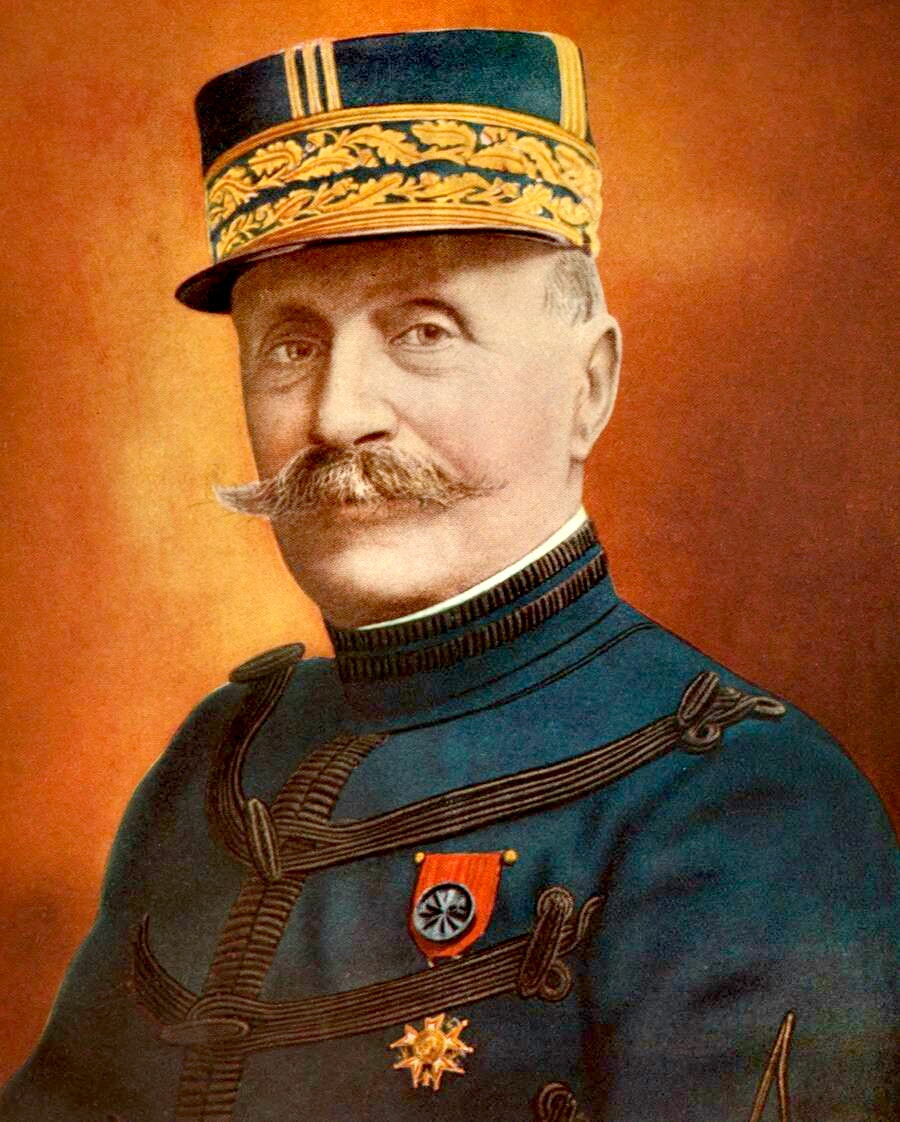
Marshal Foch, in whose honour the professorial chair is named

The position of Marshal Foch Professor of French Literature at the University of Oxford was founded in 1918 shortly after the end of the First World War. Ferdinand Foch, or "Marshal Foch", was supreme commander of Allied forces from April 1918 onwards. The chair was endowed by an arms trader, Basil Zaharoff, in Foch's honour; he also endowed a post in English Literature at the University of Paris in honour of the British Field Marshal Earl Haig. Zaharoff wanted the University of Paris to have a right of veto over the appointment, but Oxford would not accept this. The compromise reached was that Paris should have a representative on the appointing committee (although this provision was later removed). In advance of the first election, Stéphen Pichon (the French Foreign Minister) unsuccessfully attempted to influence the decision. The first professor, Gustave Rudler, was appointed in 1920. As of 2015, the chair is held by Catriona Seth. The position is held in conjunction with a Fellowship of All Souls College.

== History ==
The position of Marshal Foch Professor of French Literature in the Faculty of Medieval and Modern Languages at the University of Oxford was founded in 1918 shortly after the end of the First World War. It honours the French general Ferdinand Foch, known as "Marshal Foch", who from April 1918 was supreme commander of the Allied forces. Basil Zaharoff, a Greek-born French arms trader and financier, gave £25,000 (equivalent to £1,651,117 in 2023 in 2023) to the university to establish the chair and to support French studies in other ways, such as the award of scholarships to students for travel, e.g. the Zaharoff Travelling Scholarship. Oxford marked Zaharoff's generosity by conferring upon him an Honorary Doctorate of Civil Law (DCL) in October 1920.

News of the donation was announced in The Times on 21 November 1918, shortly after Foch was one of the signatories of the Armistice with Germany on 11 November that ended hostilities. The Times said that the name of the professorship was "most felicitously chosen", commemorating the "recent great events" and preparing for the "intellectual entente of the coming years." It also noted that French language and literature, for the first time, would be "enthroned in Oxford side by side with Greek and with Latin" – professorships in both subjects having existed at Oxford for many years before Zaharoff's donation. Zaharoff also founded the Earl Haig Chair of English Literature at the University of Paris, in honour of Douglas Haig, 1st Earl Haig, Field Marshal and commander of the British forces on the Western Front from 1915 until the end of the Great War. The necessary changes to the university's statutes were made at a meeting of Congregation (Oxford's governing body) on 18 February 1919. During the debate, Sir Herbert Warren, the president of Magdalen College, Oxford, stated that the Professor was to be paid £500 annually (equivalent to £28,418 in 2023), "making it a first-rate chair."

Zaharoff initially stipulated that Oxford's choice of Marshal Foch Professor should be approved by the University of Paris. This provision was unacceptable to Oxford University's authorities, who regarded it as ceding control over the appointment. As a compromise, it was agreed that Paris should be represented on the committee selecting the professor. According to the historian Elizabeth Greenslade, "the French regarded the appointment to the new chair as an opportunity to improve Franco-British inter-university relations." Stéphen Pichon (the French Minister of Foreign Affairs) had a preferred candidate in mind. He asked the French Ambassador in London to reach an agreement with Gustave Lanson, the representative of the University of Paris, that Lanson would support Pichon's choice during the selection process. No agreement was reached. In the end, neither Pichon's choice, nor the candidate supported by both Lanson and Zaharoff, were appointed, as Oxford wanted candidates with British teaching experience. The first professor, Gustave Rudler (formerly of the University of London), took up the position in 1920; he was one of eight French applicants for the post, and also defeated five British candidates. The anonymous London correspondent of The Manchester Guardian wrote in 1919 that London University "sustains an immense loss" through Rudler's appointment and "can ill afford to lose him", since he had "raised the study of French literature to an entirely new plane".

The post is associated with a non-stipendiary Fellowship of All Souls College. Changes to the university's internal rules since 1920 have abolished specific statutes for the duties of, and rules for appointment to, individual chairs such as the Marshal Foch Professorship. The University Council is now empowered to make appropriate arrangements for appointments and conditions of service, and the college to which any professorship is allocated (All Souls in this instance) has two representatives on the board of electors.

== Professors ==
Details about the Marshal Foch Professors
Name	Years	Education	Notes (Note: All the professors have been fellows of All Souls College, Oxford, from the start of their professorships, with the exception of Rudler, whose fellowship began in 1926.)
Gustave Rudler	1920–49	University of Paris	Rudler had previously taught at the Sorbonne and at Bedford College, London. He was particularly interested in the life and works of Benjamin Constant, the subject of his doctoral thesis as well as later publications. He also published editions of works by Jean Racine and Molière, and studied the historian Jules Michelet. Rudler was the co-founder and first editor of the French Quarterly, a periodical that ran from 1919 to 1932 which was the first English-language periodical to cover French literary matters. He was regarded at Oxford as a devoted teacher, lecturing entirely in French and asking questions of his audience that had to be answered in French.
Jean Seznec	1950–72	École Normale Supérieure, Paris	Seznec taught at the University of Cambridge and the French Institute in Florence before the Second World War, when he moved to America to be a professor at Harvard University.
Jacques Scherer	1973–79	École Normale Supérieure, Paris, and Sorbonne University, Paris	Scherer was previously Professor of French Literature at the University of Nancy and then at the Sorbonne. After leaving Oxford, he was a professor at University of Paris III: Sorbonne Nouvelle.
Robert Shackleton	1979–86	Oriel College, Oxford	Shackleton was Librarian of Brasenose College, Oxford, from 1948 to 1966 and Bodley's Librarian (head of Oxford's Bodleian Library) from 1966 to 1979.
Jean-Yves Tadié	1988–91	École Normale Supérieure, Paris	Tadié lectured at universities in Caen, Tours and Paris (University of Paris III: Sorbonne Nouvelle) before serving as head of the French Department at Cairo University from 1972 to 1976. He was director of the French Institute in London from 1976 to 1981. His publications include a biography of Proust (in French and English versions).
Malcolm Bowie	1992–2002	University of Edinburgh and University of Sussex	Bowie taught at the University of Cambridge before becoming Professor of French Literature and Language at the University of London. After leaving Oxford, he was Master of Christ's College, Cambridge (the head of the college) from 2002 to 2006.
Michael Sheringham	2004–15	University of Kent	Sheringham previously taught at the University of Kent (where he was Professor of French Literature from 1992 to 1995) and at Royal Holloway, University of London (where he was Professor of French from 1995 to 2004).
Catriona Seth	2015 onwards	University of Oxford (Magdalen College) and Université de Paris-Sorbonne	Seth was a lecturer at the Université de Rouen before becoming Professor of 18th-century French Literature and Language at the Université de Lorraine.

== See also ==
- List of professorships at the University of Oxford

== Notes and references ==
Notes
