= Brenda Moon =

British library leader active in Scotland (1931–2011)

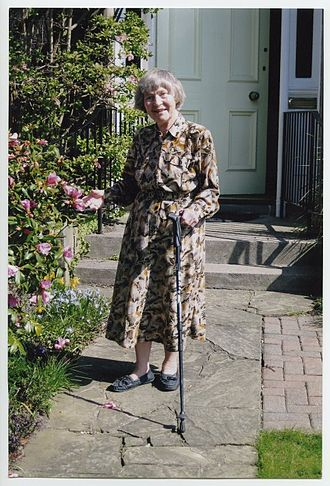
- Born: 11 April 1931; Newcastle-Under-Lyme, Staffordshire
- Died: 7 March 2011 (aged 79); Edinburgh, Scotland
- Education: University of Oxford
- Known for: Librarianship, collections, archives, digitisation

Brenda Elizabeth Moon (11 April 1931 – 7 March 2011) was Librarian to the University of Edinburgh from 1980 to 1996. She was the first female chief of a university library in Scotland, and one of the first female librarian chiefs of a major UK research university. During her tenure, she played a role in bringing Edinburgh University Library into the digital age. Under her guidance, Edinburgh became one of the first major UK university libraries to tackle issues of automation at scale.

== Education ==
Moon was born in Newcastle-under-Lyme, Staffordshire. Having receiving education in Birmingham, at King Edward's Grammar School for Girls and went to St Hilda's College, Oxford. She completed her professional training at UCL. She was joint winner of the Cowley Prize for Bibliography in 1955 and became a Fellow of the Library Association in 1958.

== Professional contribution ==
Moon was a co-founder of the Consortium of University Research Libraries (now RLUK) an organisation established to champion the specific issues of larger research libraries. She was elected a Fellow of the Royal Society of Edinburgh (RSE), subsequently acting as its curator from 2002 to 2005. Before joining University of Edinburgh in 1980 she worked as a librarian in the universities of Sheffield and Hull, where she served as deputy to Philip Larkin. She became an Assessor to the Curators of the Bodleian Library on its automation plans (1987). At the Edinburgh University Library, she contributed to expansion of the library's collections. She brought the papers of modern Scottish writers such as George Mackay Brown, Norman MacCaig, and Hugh MacDiarmid to the Library alongside the papers of Arthur Koestler, the papers of John Middleton Murry, the Barry Bloomfield and A H Campbell Collections of editions of W H Auden and the Corson Collection of Sir Walter Scott Materials.

She had a lifelong personal research interest in writing about women travellers. While working at Edinburgh, she gained a MPhil (Leeds University) writing a thesis about Marianne North. After retiring, she attained a PhD (Hull) for a thesis on Amelia B. Edwards later published as a book, Most Usefully Employed: Amelia B Edwards, Writer, Traveller, and Campaigner for Ancient Egypt (2006).

== Legacy ==
Following her death her extensive personal collection of books was shared amongst the libraries of Edinburgh and Hull universities with a significant proportion being sold for her favourite charity, Christian Aid. The University of Edinburgh named a room in the library in her honour but this room was subsequently lost in a remodeling of the library space. On International Women's Day 2019, the university named the Boardroom in Argyle House in Edinburgh's West Port after Moon.
