= Michael Sheringham =

British academic (1948–2016)

Michael Hugh Tempest Sheringham FBA (2 June 1948 – 21 January 2016) was Marshal Foch Professor of French Literature at the University of Oxford from 2004 until his retirement in 2015. He had previously acted a lecturer at University of Kent and University of Ulster

== Biography ==
Sheringham was born in Cairo on 2 June 1948. His father, John Guy Tempest Sheringham was a civil servant, and his mother, Yvette Agnès (née Habib) was a journalist and poet. The family returned to UK in the early 1950, and settled near Reading, where Sheringham attended Wallingford County Grammar School. He then studied at University of Kent between 1966 and 1970.

On 20 September 1974, Sheringham married Priscilla Monique (Cilla) Duhamel, whom he had met at the University of Kent, and they had two children together. Around the same time as his marriage, he gained his first teaching role at University of Ulster. The following year he left Northern Ireland and returned to the University of Kent, where he became a lecturer.

Sheringham taught at the University of Kent (where he was Professor of French Literature from 1992 to 1995) and at Royal Holloway, University of London (where he was Professor of French from 1995 to 2004). He was appointed a Fellow of the British Academy in 2010. Marshal Foch Professor of French Literature at the University of Oxford from 2004 until his retirement in 2015. He was also a Fellow of All Souls College, Oxford.

Sheringham died at home in Oxford from prostate cancer on 21 January 2016.
