= Jean Seznec =

Historian and mythographer

Jean Seznec (19 March 1905, in Morlaix – 22 November 1983, in Oxford) was a historian and mythographer whose most influential book, for English-speaking readers, is La Survivance des dieux antiques (1940), translated as The Survival of the Pagan Gods: Mythological Tradition in Renaissance Humanism and Art (1953). Expanding the scope of work by Warburg Institute scholars Fritz Saxl and Erwin Panofsky, Seznec presented a broad view of the transmission of classical representation in Western art.

== Career ==
Seznec won a place at the French Academy in Rome in 1929, where he studied under Émile Mâle, whose methodology influenced his own work. At the outbreak of World War II, Seznec returned from his position in Florence as director of the French Institute, to enlist. His major work was published in 1940, just as France fell. After the war he accepted a position in Romance Languages and Literatures at Harvard University, where he taught from 1941 to 1949. He then was elected Marshal Foch Professor of French Literature at Oxford University, a chair that he held, along with a fellowship of All Souls College, Oxford, from 1950 until his retirement in 1972. He edited exhibition catalogues and the edition of Paris Salon art criticism written by the Encyclopédiste Denis Diderot between 1759–1781, an important primary resource for understanding the history of taste. A conference was held in his memory at the Warburg Institute in 2000.

Thanks largely to Seznec, it is widely understood that the Olympian gods, and the earlier spirits of field and spring, did not die with the advent of Christianity, but lived on. His work traces the process in which they were already transformed during late antiquity, whether embedded within history as transfigured former human beings in the Euhemerist view that was embraced by Christian apologists (interpretatio christiana), or given planetary roles as astral divinities in the worldview of astrology and magic or allegorized as moral emblems. They surviving in pictorial and in literary traditions and among the common people went underground to feature in folk culture, took on strange new guises and were transformed in various ways, their myths recast to suit some of the mythic saints of late antiquity. Their imagery permeated Medieval intellectual and emotional life. The transformed mythology re-emerged in the iconography of the early Tuscan Renaissance, with new attributes that the ancients had never imagined, and enjoyed tremendous renewed popularity during the Renaissance.

Seznec's work benefits from the illustrated formats it has been receiving in modern paperback formats. Studies such as Joscelyn Godwin's The Pagan Dream Of The Renaissance (2002) depend on it. Godwin further explores Seznec's theme, how pagan deities captivated the European imagination during the Renaissance, taking their place side-by-side with Christian iconography and doctrines.

== Works ==
- La survivance des dieux antiques. Essai sur le rôle de la tradition mythologique dans l’humanisme et dans l’art de la Renaissance (Studies of the Warburg Institute, 11), London: The Warburg Institute 1940; 2nd ed. Paris: Flammarion 1980, repr. 1993
  - English tr.: The survival of the pagan gods. The mythological tradition and its place in Renaissance humanism and art. Tr. Barbara F. Sessions, New York 1953, repr. Princeton, N.J.: Princeton UP 1972, 1995
  - German tr.: Das Fortleben der antiken Götter. Die mythologische Tradition im Humanismus und in der Kunst der Renaissance. Tr. H. Jatho, 1990
  - Spanish tr. : Los dioses de la Antigüedad en la Edad Media y en el Renacimiento. Tr. Juan Aranzadi, Taurus, Madrid 1983

== See also ==
- Aby Warburg
