= Robert Shackleton =

British linguist and librarian (1919–1986)

Robert Shackleton CBE

Marshal Foch Professor of French Literature, University of Oxford
- In office 1979 – 9 September 1986

Bodley's Librarian, Bodleian Library, University of Oxford
- In office 1966–1979

Personal details
- Born: 25 November 1919 Todmorden, West Riding of Yorkshire, England
- Died: 9 September 1986 (aged 66)
- Occupation: Philologist, librarian

Robert Shackleton CBE (25 November 1919 – 9 September 1986) was an English French language philologist and librarian.

Shackleton was born in Todmorden, West Riding of Yorkshire. He was educated at Oriel College, Oxford, and taught French at Brasenose College, Oxford, from 1946 to 1966. He also served as college librarian from 1948 to 1966.

From 1966 to 1979 he served as Bodley's Librarian, the director of the Bodleian Library. In 1983-84 he held the Lyell Readership in Bibliography and lectured on "The Bibliographical History of Montesquieu."

From 1979 to 1986 he was Marshal Foch Professor of French Literature at the university, a position that carried with it a Fellowship at All Souls College, Oxford.

He was appointed a Commander of the Order of the British Empire (CBE) in 1986.

He was a bibliophile who amassed a considerable collection of books relating to the Enlightenment, much of which is now in the John Rylands Library in Manchester. He also bequeathed a collection of c.1,000 volumes concerning Charles de Secondat, Baron de Montesquieu (1689–1755) to the Bodleian Library. He is the author of Montesquieu: A Critical Biography a standard introduction to Montesquieu's life and thought as well as to the historical and intellectual background.
