= John Lawrence (writer) =

English writer (1753–1839)

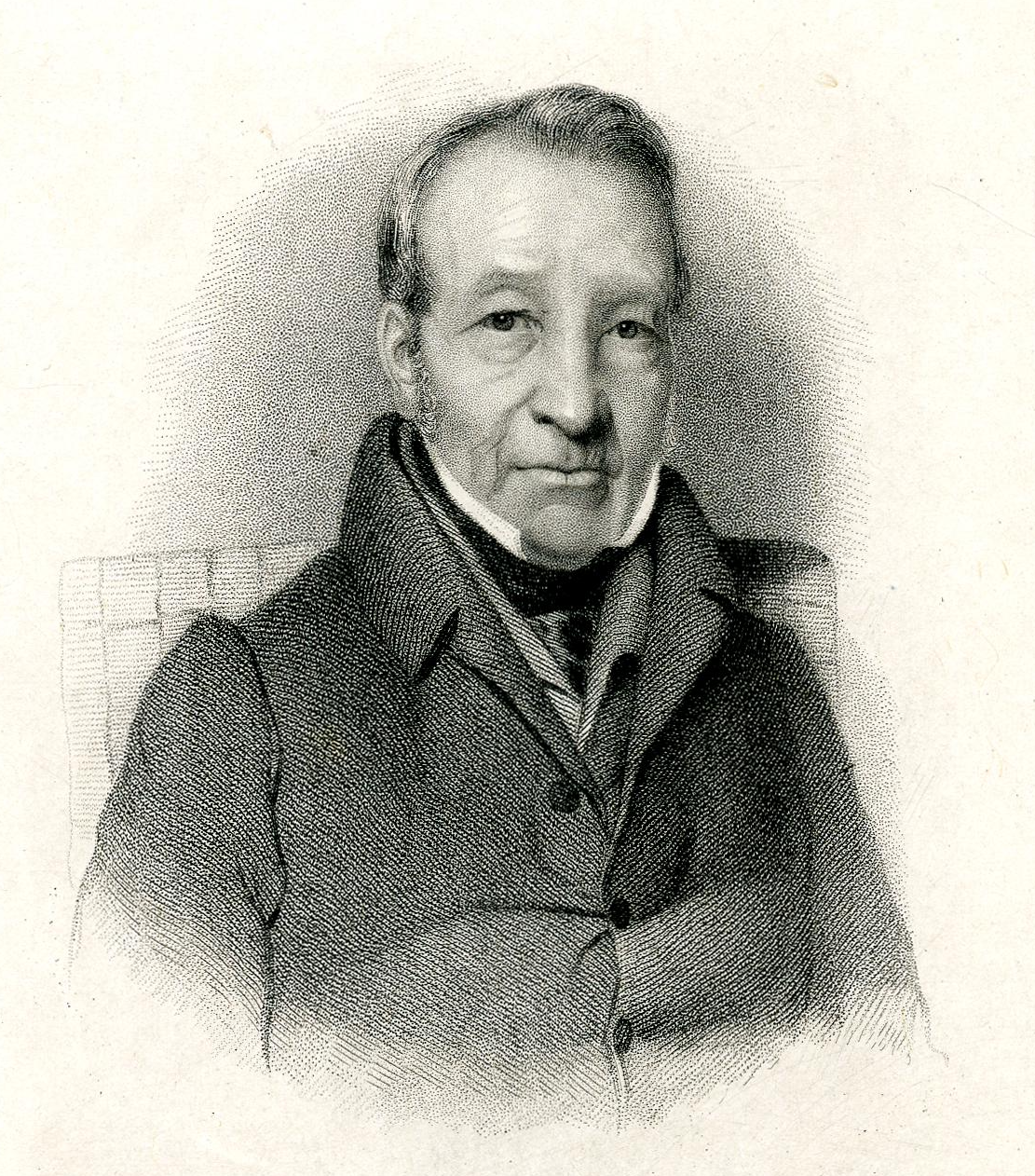
- Portrait of John Lawrence, 1832
- Born: 22 January 1753; Colchester, England
- Died: 17 January 1839 (aged 85); Peckham, England
- Occupation: Writer
- Spouse: Ann Barton (m. 1783)
- Children: 6

John Lawrence (22 January 1753 – 17 January 1839) was an English writer on political and agricultural subjects and an early advocate of animal welfare and rights.

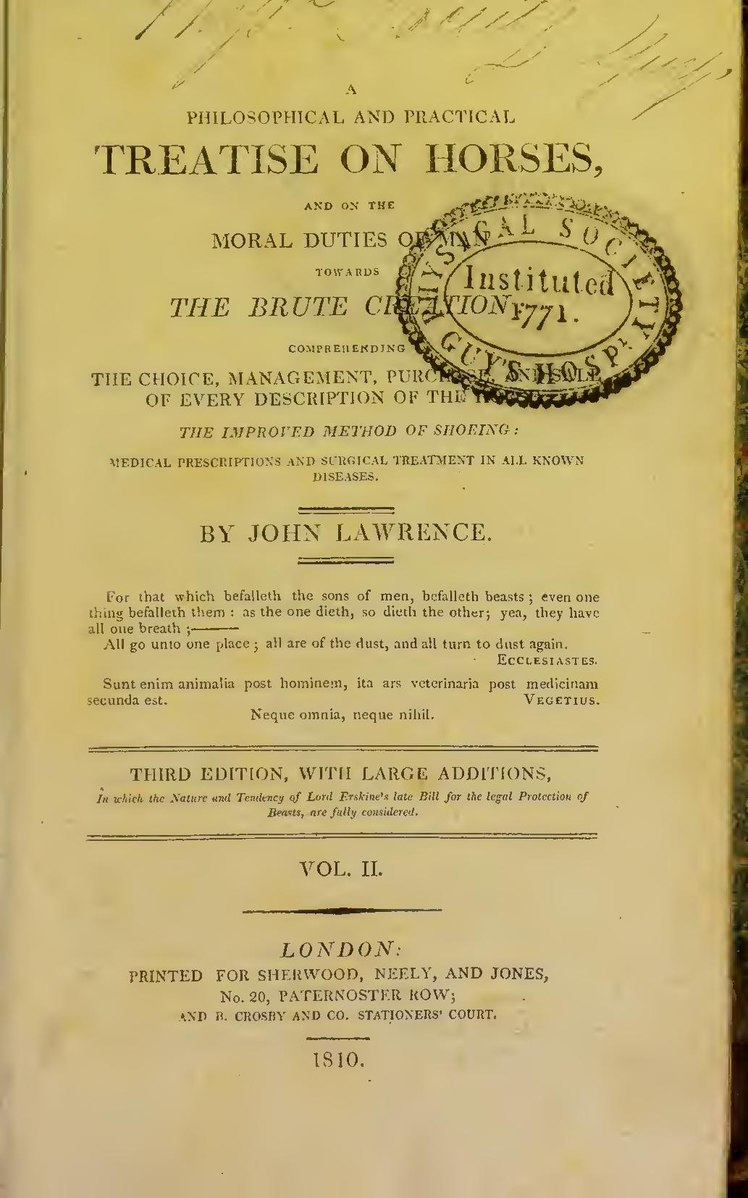
Title page of 3rd edition (1810) of John Lawrence's "A Philosophical and Practical Treatise on Horses"

== Early life ==
Lawrence was born 22 January 1753 in or near Colchester, the son and grandson of brewers. His father John died when Lawrence was 10, and Lawrence later invested his inheritance in a stock farm. When he was 15 he wrote a school essay "in favour of kindness to animals". His first publications were political and showed admiration of the French Revolution and advancing the rights of man.

== Works on animals and animal rights ==
In 1796 he published the first volume of his most successful work, A Philosophical and Practical Treatise on Horses and on the Moral Duties of Man towards the Brute Creation. In his New Farmer's Calendar (1800) and The Modern Land Steward (1801) he advocated for killing food animals painlessly. In an 1805 Dictionary of the Veterinary Art, Lawrence's "enlightened" views on the rights of beasts are recommended to veterinarians. In his British Field Sports (1818) he proposed a system of "sporting ethics" "to root out 'that horrible propensity in the human breast, a sense of sport and delight in witnessing the tortures of brute animals.'" He was consulted by Richard Martin about Martin's Cruel Treatment of Cattle Act 1822, one of the first pieces of animal welfare legislation.

Lawrence was considered in his time an authority on horses; his History of the Horse went through fourteen editions in his lifetime, and he was a regular contributor to publications such as The Sporting Magazine.

After a period in which he was largely forgotten, Lawrence's arguments for animal rights were republished in 1879 by Edward Nicholson in his The Rights of an Animal: A New Essay in Ethics. Lawrence was also quoted extensively in Henry Stephens Salt's 1894 Animals' Rights: Considered in Relation to Social Progress.

== Quotes ==
In his 1796 "Philosophical and Practical Treatise on Horses", Lawrence wrote of the rights of animals: They arise then, spontaneously, from the conscience, or sense of moral obligation in man, who is indispensably bound to bestow upon animals, in return for the benefit he derives from their services, "good and sufficient nourishment, comfortable shelter, and merciful treatment; to commit no wanton outrage upon their feelings, whilst alive, and to put them to the speediest and least painful death, when it shall be necessary to deprive them of life."

Lawrence was one of the first to call for laws to protect animals. I therefore propose, that the Rights of Beasts be formally acknowledged by the state, and that a law be framed upon that principle, to guard and protect them from acts of flagrant and wanton cruelty, whether committed by their owners or others.

== Family and death ==
Lawrence spent time living in Bury St. Edmunds, close to his farm, in London in Lambeth Marsh and Somers Town, and at the end of his life in Peckham, then just outside London. About 1783 Lawrence married Ann Barton, with whom he had a son and five daughters. Only his youngest daughter left descendants.

Lawrence died of influenza on 17 January 1839 and was buried in Norwood.

== Works ==
- "The Patriot's Calendar" (3 editions, for the years 1794, 1795, and 1796)
- 'Rights and Remedies, or the Theory and Practice of true Politics, with a View of the Evils of the Present War and a Proposal of immediate Peace,' London, 1795, 2 parts
- 'The Sportsman, Farrier, and Shoeing Smith's New Guide, being the substance of the Works of the late Charles Vial de St. Bell,' London, 1796
- 'A Philosophical and Practical Treatise on Horses and on the Moral Duties of Man Towards the Brute Creation,' London, 1796-1798, 2 vols. (2nd rev. ed. 1802, 3rd rev. ed. 1810)
- 'The New Farmer's Calendar, a Monthly Remembrancer for all kinds of Country Business, comprehending all the Material Improvements in the New Husbandry with the Management of Live Stock, by a Farmer and Breeder.' London, 1800 (rev. ed. 1801)
- 'The Modern Land Steward, in which the Duties and Functions of Stewardship are considered and explained, with their several relations to the interests of the Landlord, Tenant, and the Public.' London, 1801
- 'A General Treatise on Cattle, the Ox, the Sheep, and the Swine, comprehending their Breeding, Management, Improvement, and Diseases.' London, 1806 (2nd ed. with additions 1809)
- 'The History and Delineation of the Horse in all his Varieties, with an Investigation of the Character of the Racehorse and the Business of the Turf, the engravings from original paintings, with instructions for the General Management of the Horse.' London, 1809
- 'Practical Treatise on Breeding, Rearing, and Fattening all kinds of Domestic Poultry, Pheasants, Pigeons, and Rabbits, Swine, Bees, Cows, &c..' "Bonington Moubray" (i.e. Lawrence), London, 1813 (eight editions by 1842)
- 'British Field Sports, embracing Practical Instructions in Shooting, Hunting, Coursing, Racing, Cocking, Fishing, &c, with Observations on the Breaking and Training of Dogs and Horses and the Management of Fowling-pieces, by "W. H. Scott" (i.e. Lawrence), London, 1818
- 'The Sportsman's Repository, comprising a series of engravings representing the Horse and the Dog by John Scott, with a description of the different species of each.' London, 1820
- 'A Memoir of the late Sir T. C. Bunbury.' Ipswich, 1821 (Bunbury was a prominent figure in English horse-racing.)
- 'The National Sports of Great Britain, by Henry Aiken, with descriptions in English and French.' London, 1821, fol. (coloured lithographs by Aiken, text by Lawrence, anonymous)
- 'The Horse in all his Varieties and Uses: His Breeding, Rearing, and Management'. London, 1829
