= Jacques Scherer =

French scholar

Jacques Scherer (24 February 1912 – 4 June 1997) was a French scholar, who was a professor in universities in France and at the University of Oxford.

== Career ==
Jacques Scherer was educated at the Ecole Normale Supérieure and then studied at the Sorbonne University in Paris, gaining his doctorate. He was Professor of French Literature at the University of Nancy from 1946 to 1954, when he moved to Sorbonne University as Professor of French Literature and Theatre. He left in 1973 on his appointment as Marshal Foch Professor of French Literature at Oxford, a position that carried with it a Fellowship of All Souls College, Oxford. In 1979, he returned to France as Professor at University of Paris III: Sorbonne Nouvelle. He retired in 1983 and was made Emeritus Professor.

== Publications ==
His publications included:

- L’expression littéraire dans l’œuvre de Mallarmé (1947)
- La dramaturgie classique en France (1950)
- La dramaturgie de Beaumarchais (1954)
- Le "Livre" de Mallarmé (1957, second edition 1977)
- Structures de Tartuffe (1966)
- Grammaire de Mallarmé (1977)
- Le théâtre de Corneille (1984)
- Le théâtre en Afrique noire francophone (1992)
- Dramaturgies de vrai-faux (1994)
