= Thomas Lockey =

English librarian and Anglican priest (c. 1602–1679)

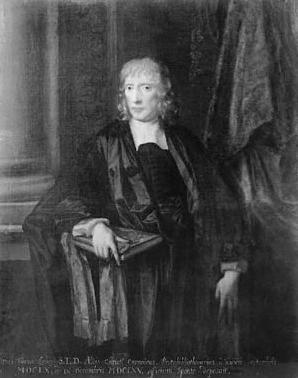
A portrait of Thomas Lockey

Thomas Lockey (c. 1602 – 29 June 1679) was an English librarian and Anglican priest, who was Bodley's Librarian from 1660 to 1665.

== Life ==
Lockey's parentage is unknown, as is his date of birth, which was probably sometime in 1602. He was a scholar at Westminster School, proceeding to Christ Church, Oxford in 1618. He matriculated on 16 March 1621, obtained his Bachelor of Arts degree in 1622, his Master of Arts degree in 1625 and his Bachelor of Divinity degree in 1634. He was ordained as a priest in the Church of England and served as vicar of East Garston, Berkshire, until 1633, and may have been the "Thomas Lockey" who was a prebendary of Chichester Cathedral from 1639 to 1642. Lockey lived in Oxford, working as a tutor at Christ Church and preaching. One of his sermons, in January 1651, offended the Parliamentarians in charge of the university at that time, and he was thereafter banned from preaching and teaching; he left Oxford and did not return until the Restoration of King Charles II.

Lockey was appointed Bodley's Librarian (the head of the Bodleian Library at the University of Oxford) on 28 September 1660, having been appointed prebendary of Salisbury Cathedral earlier in the year. He obtained his Doctor of Divinity degree in November 1660. As Librarian, he was known for being courteous, but the antiquarian Anthony Wood described him as "not altogether fit for that office." Thomas Hearne, writing in the first half of the 18th century, described Lockey as "a very curious, nice man", who was "reckon'd the best in the university for classical learning".

As Librarian, Lockey began, but did not finish, a catalogue of John Selden's books and manuscripts that had been acquired by the library during the time in office of his predecessor, Thomas Barlow. His final act as Librarian was to give a speech in Latin when the Chancellor of the University of Oxford and the Chancellor of the University of Cambridge (Edward Hyde, 1st Earl of Clarendon, and Edward Montagu, 2nd Earl of Manchester) visited the Bodleian on 8 September 1665. He resigned on 29 November 1665.

He was made a canon of Christ Church Cathedral in 1663, and was installed in 1665. He died of a "surfeit of cherries" on 29 June 1679, and was buried in the cathedral. His goods, which included a large number of books, statutes, paintings, rings, medals and a telescope, were valued at £652 13s 6d (approximately £114,000 as of 2023).
