= Collectanea Topographica et Genealogica =

Collectanea Topographica et Genealogica is an eight-volume miscellany of previously unpublished material related to genealogy collated by Sir Frederic Madden (1801–1873), Rev. Bulkeley Bandinel (1781–1861) and John Gough Nichols (1806–1873), that was published quarterly from 1834.

The editors' own summary of the contents of all eight volumes appeared at the end of the final volume, page 457.

== Contents ==
- Volume 1 (1834):
  - Details of the sales of bishops' lands
  - Church notes from Staveley and Crich in Derbyshire
  - Extracts from Parish Registers
  - Extensive family trees showing marriages between nobility and royalty
- Volume 2 (1835):
  - Details of roll of arms
  - Registers
  - Pedigrees
  - Deeds
  - Wills
  - List of monastic chartularies
- Volume 3:
  - Registers
  - Pedigrees
  - Deeds
  - An evaluation of the estates of the bishoprics of England and Wales
  - Descriptions of banners, standards, and badges from Edward III ro Henry VIII
- Volume 4:
  - Roll of arms
  - Pedigrees
  - Funeral certificates
  - Burials
  - Parish register extracts
  - Deeds
  - Charters
  - Wills
- Volume 5:
  - Parish register extracts
  - Wills
  - Baptisms
  - Burials
  - Deeds
  - Epitaphs
  - Pedigrees
  - Names of pilgrims from England to the Vatican in Rome
- Volume 6:
  - Pedigrees
  - Charters
  - An abstract of a chartulary of Hexham Abbey
  - Additions to Dugdales's baronage
- Volume 7:
  - Pedigrees
  - Registers
  - Memorials
  - Church Notes
  - Muster Rolls
  - Transcripts and Extracts of Wills
- Volume 8 (1843):
  - Pedigrees
  - Church Notes
  - Residents in Warwick
  - Wills
  - Burials
  - Contents Pages for all Eight Volumes

== Sources ==
- http://genealogyreviews.co.uk/fhmdec06_collect.htm
