= Catriona Seth =

British literary scholar (1964)

Professor Catriona Seth FBA
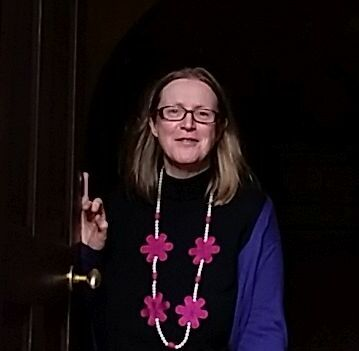
- Seth in 2016
- Born: 30 August 1964 (age 62); Worsthorne, Lancashire, England
- Title: Marshal Foch Professor of French Literature (2015–present)

Academic background
- Education: Magdalen College, Oxford; Paris-Sorbonne University

Academic work
- Discipline: French literature and History of ideas
- Sub-discipline: 18th-century French literature; Contemporary French literature; Autobiographical writing; Age of Enlightenment; Cultural history
- Institutions: University of Rouen; Nancy 2 University; University of Lorraine; Faculty of Medieval and Modern Languages, University of Oxford; All Souls College, Oxford

Catriona Jane Seth, FBA (born 30 August 1964) is a British scholar of French literature and the history of ideas. Since 2015, she has been Marshal Foch Professor of French Literature at the University of Oxford and a Fellow of All Souls College, Oxford.

== Early life and education ==
Seth was born on 30 August 1964 in Worsthorne, Lancashire, England. She holds Irish and British citizenship. She was brought up in England, Scotland, Switzerland, Belgium, and South America. She was educated at Colegio Francia in Caracas, Venezuela, at Lycée Sainte-Croix in Fribourg, Switzerland, and at Lycée français de Belgique in Belgium.

Seth studied law and modern languages (French and Spanish) at Magdalen College, Oxford, graduating with a Bachelor of Arts (BA) degree in 1986: as per tradition, her BA was promoted to a Master of Arts (MA Oxon) in 2001. She then studied at Paris-Sorbonne University, completing a Maîtrise degree in 1987, a Diplôme d'études approfondies (DEA) in 1988, and a Doctor of Philosophy (PhD) degree in 1995. Her doctoral thesis was on Évariste de Parny, the 18th-century French poet, and was supervised by Sylvain Menant.

== Academic career ==
Seth spent most of her academic career teaching in France. She completed the Agrégation in 1995, and the Habilitation à diriger des recherches (HDR) in 2004. From 1995 to 2000, she was a Professeur agrégé at the Académie de Rouen. From 2000 to 2006, she was a tenured lecturer in 18th-century French literature at the University of Rouen. From 2006, she was Professor of 18th-century French literature at Nancy 2 University. When Nancy 2 University was merged with other universities to become the University of Lorraine, she continued her teaching at the new institution. Between 2013 and 2014, she was also a World Leading Researcher at Queen's University, Belfast. She has been a visiting professor at Indiana University (Bloomington, USA), at the Université de Gafsa (Tunisia) and at the University of Augsburg (Germany). She has been a Guest Researcher at the University of Bergamo (Italy), a Bogliasco Foundation Fellow, a Chawton House Fellow and was Senior Anniversary Fellow at the Institute of Advanced Studies in the Humanities (IASH) of the University of Edinburgh in 2023.

On 1 October 2015, she was appointed Marshal Foch Professor of French Literature in the Faculty of Medieval and Modern Languages, University of Oxford. At the same time, she was elected a University Academic Fellow of All Souls College, Oxford.

== Honours ==
In October 2012, Seth gave the fifth annual Burgerhartlezing (Burgerhart Lecture) under the title Nobody's Children? Foundlings, Identity and Individual Rights in the Enlightenment. In March 2014, she gave the John Rule Memorial Lecture at the University of Southampton.

In July 2017, she was elected a Fellow of the British Academy (FBA), the United Kingdom's national academy for the humanities and social sciences. She was appointed an associate member of the Académie Royale des sciences, des lettres et des beaux-arts de Belgique in June 2018.

In July 2018, Seth was awarded an honorary doctorate "for services to education" by Queen's University Belfast.

In 2019, Seth was elected a Fellow of the Academia Europaea.

== Selected works ==
- Martine Bercot; Michel Collot; Catriona Seth, eds. (2000). Anthologie de la poésie française: XVIIIe–XXe siècles (in French). Paris: Gallimard. ISBN 978-2070115990.
- Michel Delon; Catriona Seth (2004). Sade en toutes lettres (in French). Desjonquères. ISBN 978-2843210679.
- Catriona Seth (2005). André Chénier: le miracle du siècle (in French). Paris: Presses Paris Sorbonne. ISBN 978-2840504184.
- Catriona Seth (2006). Marie-Antoinette: Anthologie et dictionnaire (in French). Paris: Laffont.
- Catriona Seth (2008). Les Rois aussi en mouraient. Les Lumières en lutte contre la petite vérole (in French). Paris: Desjonquères.
- Robert Kahn; Catriona Seth (2010). La Retraduction (in French). Mont-Saint-Aignan: Publications de l'Université de Rouen et du Havre. ISBN 978-2877758017.
- Catriona Seth; Eric Wauters (2010). Autour de Bernardin de Saint-Pierre: les écrits et les hommes des Lumières à l'Empire (in French). Mont-Saint-Aignan: Publications de l'Université de Rouen et du Havre. ISBN 978-2877755047.
- Catriona Seth ed. (2011). Laclos, Les Liaisons dangereuses (in French). Paris: Gallimard, Bibl. de la Pléiade.
- Catriona Seth (2013). La Fabrique de l'intime (in French). Éditions Robert Laffont. ISBN 978-2221135297.
- Catriona Seth (2014). Évariste Parny (1753-1814): Créole, révolutionnaire, académicien (in French). Paris: Hermann.
- Rotraud von Kulessa; Catriona Seth, eds. (2017). L'idée de l'Europe: au Siècle des Lumières (in French). Cambridge: Open Book Publishers. ISBN 978-1783743469.
- Catriona Seth; Rotraud von Kulessa, eds. (2017). The Idea of Europe: Enlightenment Perspectives. Cambridge: Open Book Publishers. ISBN 978-1783743810.
- Catriona Seth; Rotraud von Kulessa, eds. (2017). Die Europaidee im Zeitalter der Aufklärung. Cambridge: Open Book Publishers. ISBN 978-1783744015.
- Madame de Staël; Catriona Seth; Valérie Cossy, eds. (2017). Œuvres (in French). Paris: Gallimard. ISBN 978-2070143900.
- Marie-Antoinette; Catriona Seth, eds. (2019). Lettres inédites (in French). Paris: Albin Michel. ISBN 978-2226445285.
