= Gustave Rudler =

French scholar and academic

Gustave Rudler (11 January 1872 – 17 October 1957) was a French scholar and academic, who served as the first Marshal Foch Professor of French Literature at the University of Oxford from 1920 until 1949.

== Life ==
Gustave Rudler was born in Besançon, France; his father taught at the local lycée. Rudler studied in Paris at the Lycée Louis-le-Grand and the École Normale Supérieure and, after graduating, taught rhetoric at various lycées including Louis-le-Grand. For his doctoral thesis of 1908, for which he was directed by the scholar Gustave Lanson, he studied the French-born writer and academic Benjamin Constant, and the result was regarded as a major contribution to scholarship relating to Constant. After a period teaching at the Sorbonne, Rudler moved to Bedford College (now part of Royal Holloway, University of London) in 1913 as professor of French. Apart from military service during the First World War, he spent the remainder of his academic life in England. In 1920, he was appointed as the first Marshal Foch Professor of French Literature at the University of Oxford, and was also made a Fellow of All Souls College, Oxford. He was regarded as a devoted teacher, lecturing in French and asking questions of his audience that had to be answered in French. Retiring in 1949, he returned to Paris, where he died on 17 October 1957.

== Scholarship ==
Rudler was heavily influenced by Lanson's work and approach to literary criticism, and this was displayed in some of his work such as books on textual criticism published in 1902 and 1923. This approach was not to all tastes, and his influence in Britain led to a "scientific" approach to the study of French that was not appreciated by all. Rudler published extensively on the life and work of Constant, but also on the historian Jules Michelet, with editions of works by Jean Racine and Molière. He was the co-founder and first editor of the French Quarterly, a periodical that ran from 1919 to 1932 which was the first English-language periodical covering French literature.
