= Eric Bertrand Ceadel =

Eric Bertrand Ceadel (7 February 1921 – 1 June 1979) was a japanologist and university administrator. He was a University Lecturer in Japanese at the University of Cambridge, a Fellow of Corpus Christi College, Cambridge from 1962, and Librarian of the Cambridge University Library from 1967 until his death.

== War service ==
Ceadel had studied Classics at Christ's College, Cambridge, and had already published three articles as an undergraduate. From September 1941 he served in the British Army until he was demobilized in 1945 with the rank of captain. On the outbreak of war with Japan he was selected for the first of the twelve courses in Japanese which were run at the secret Bedford Japanese School, part of the Inter-Services Special Intelligence School in Bedford. The teacher was Captain Oswald Tuck RN. Most of the graduates of each 6-month course were sent to Bletchley Park to work on decrypted Japanese signals, but Ceadel was retained as a teacher for all the subsequent courses. He was responsible for the development of the teaching materials used and liaised closely with Bletchley Park to ensure that the instruction offered at the Bedford Japanese School kept pace with the needs of the cryptographers.

== Postwar career ==
After the war Ceadel returned to Cambridge as a research student at Christ's College, where he worked on the historical development of the Japanese literary language. In 1947 he was appointed to the first newly created lectureship in Japanese at Cambridge and in subsequent years he oversaw the development of Japanese studies at Cambridge. He first travelled to Japan in 1950 to buy books for the University Library. During the visit to Britain in 1953 of Crown Prince Akihito, who succeeded his father as emperor of Japan in 1989, he spent 26–28 May in Cambridge, visiting Trinity College, King's College, the University Library and the Fitzwilliam Museum: Ceadel's services during this visit were described as 'indispensable'. Subsequently, he was heavily involved in University administration, serving on the General Board, the Financial Board and the Council of the Senate. In 1967 he was appointed University Librarian.

== Publications ==
- "The ‘Askew Collations’ of Aeschylus", The Classical Quarterly vol. 34, pt 1-2 (1940), pp. 55 – 60
- "Resolved Feet in the Trimeters of Euripides and the Chronology of the Plays", The Classical Quarterly vol. 35, pt 1-2 (1941), pp. 66 – 89
- "The Division of Parts Among the Actors in Sophocles' Oedipus Coloneus", The Classical Quarterly vol. 35, pt 3-4 (1941), pp. 139 – 147
- "Published works of the late Professor Gustav Haloun " in Asia Major vol. 3 pt. 1 (1953)
- "The Oi River Poems and Preface " in Asia Major vol. 3 pt. 1 (1953)
- "Far Eastern Collections in Libraries in Great Britain, France, Holland and Germany " in Asia Major vol. 3 pt 2 (1953)
- "Japanese Research on Buddhism Since the Meiji Period" (with A. Hirakawa), Monumenta Nipponica vol. 11, pt 3 (1955), pp. 221 – 246, and vol. 11, pt 4 (1956), pp. 397 – 424
- "Tadamine's Preface to the ōi River Poems" in Bulletin of the School of Oriental and African Studies vol. 18, pt 2 (1956), pp. 331 – 343
- "The Two Prefaces of the Kokinshuu" in Asia Major vol. 7 (1959)
- (As editor) Literatures of the East: an appreciation (London: John Murray, 1953)
- Classified Catalogue of Modern Japanese Books in Cambridge University Library (Cambridge: W. Heffer and Sons Ltd., 1962)

== Sources ==
- Richard Bowring, ed., Fifty years of Japanese at Cambridge: a chronicle with reminiscences (Faculty of Oriental Studies, University of Cambridge, 1998).
- Gordon Johnson and Derek Brewer, "Foreword", in Nozomu Hayashi and Peter Kornicki, Early Japanese books in Cambridge University Library (Cambridge University Press, 1991), pp. xi-xiv.
- Peter Kornicki, "Eric Bertrand Ceadel, 1921-79: Japanese studies at Cambridge", in H. Cortazzi, ed., Britain and Japan: Biographical Portraits vol 5 (Folkestone: Global Oriental, 2005), pp. 337–343.
- Peter Kornicki, Eavesdropping on the Emperor: Interrogators and Codebreakers in Britain's War with Japan (London: Hurst & Co., 2021).
- Oswald Tuck The Bedford Japanese School (typescript completed in 1945 and preserved in the Archives of Churchill College Cambridge); published in Peter Kornicki, Captain Oswald Tuck and the Bedford Japanese School, 1942-1945 (London: Pollino Publishing, 2019).
- Obituary in The Times (23 Nov. 1979).

Academic offices
Preceded by Harry Creswick	University Librarian (Cambridge); 1923–1949	Succeeded by Frederick William Ratcliffe
