= Oswald Tuck =

British naval officer and Japanese teacher

Oswald Thomas Tuck
- Born: 1 September 1876; Lee, London
- Died: 26 February 1950 (aged 73); Bromley, Kent
- Military career
- Allegiance: United Kingdom
- Branch: Royal Navy
- Service years: 1899–1937, 1942–1946
- Rank: Instructor Captain

Instructor Captain Oswald Thomas Tuck (1 September 1876 – 26 February 1950) was a naval officer and teacher of Japanese. He served as a naval instructor in navigation and Japanese and later translated a confidential history of the Russo-Japanese War. He retired as an Instructor Captain in the Royal Navy but was recalled to duty in 1941 to run the Bedford Japanese School, which trained young men and women for work at Bletchley Park.

== Early years ==
Tuck was the fourth son and fifth and last child of Henry Barber Tuck (1834–1906) and Harriott Tuck (née Horn (1837–1907). He attended the Royal Hospital School, Greenwich, leaving in January 1892 with the highest results in his class. While still at school he applied to William Christie, the Astronomer Royal, to take the examination to become a 'computer' at the Royal Observatory. He was the only candidate and his examination papers were judged excellent. He began work at the Royal Observatory, Greenwich, on 11 January 1892, at the age of 15. As a 'supernumerary computer', it was his job to turn observational data into a standard form. In 1893 he was certified as competent in the use of the transit circle (a device similar to a meridian circle used to time the transit of stars across the local meridian) and the use of the Sheepshanks Equatorial telescope. In July 1894, after having worked at the Royal Observatory for two and half years, he resigned his position. He must have continued his astronomical studies for, in November 1895, at the age of 19, he was the youngest person ever elected a Fellow of the Royal Astronomical Society. He was proposed by Edward Walter Maunder, who was a senior member of staff at the Royal Observatory. He left the Royal Astronomical Society in 1901.

== Royal Navy service in East Asia ==
In 1894 he was appointed to teach astronomy and navigation on HMS Conway, a merchant marine training ship stationed on the Mersey near Liverpool. During this period of his life he was going to the theatre and to concerts in Liverpool and was also taking London University external examinations at University College Liverpool (now the University of Liverpool). In 1898 he passed Intermediate Science and applied to become a Naval Instructor. In June 1899 he received an appointment as a Naval Instructor, and was sent to East Asia. He served first in HMS Goliath, a battleship launched in 1898 and based on the China Station, and later in HMS King Alfred, an armoured cruiser which was the flagship of the China Station.

In June 1904, four years after Tuck had begun learning Japanese on his own initiative and two years after the Anglo-Japanese Alliance had come into force, the Admiralty made special arrangements for the study of Japanese by naval officers, allowing up to a year's residence in Japan. In August Vice-Admiral Sir Gerard Noel, Commander-in-Chief of the China Station, wrote to Sir Claude Maxwell MacDonald, the first British ambassador to Japan, seeking the services of a "suitable and reliable Instructor in the Japanese language for service with the British China Squadron", possibly a "suitable retired Japanese Naval Officer, who has perhaps been wounded in the war and would be glad of a little financial assistance". In February 1905, Macdonald replied to Noel to say that Baron Komura Jutarō, the Minister of Foreign Affairs, had been unable to find a suitable person. By this time Tuck was living in Japan and studying the language full-time, although he was finding the expenses involved much greater than he had expected. Later in 1905 Sir Claude MacDonald instructed John Harington Gubbins, who had been Japanese Secretary in the British Legation for many years and had a good command of Japanese, to examine Tuck on his knowledge of Japanese. Gubbins reported in September that Tuck had gained full marks in colloquial and more than 75% for each of the two written papers, and that he had a good knowledge of Chinese characters. "A little further study of newspapers, and a course of instruction in what is known as official dispatch style, would, I think, enable Mr. Tuck to attain the standard required for interpreters in the Japan Consular Service", he concluded. In December Tuck received a certificate stating that he had passed the examination for Interpreter in Japanese and a few days later received appointment as Interpreter in Japanese on HMS King Alfred. In February 1906 Vice-Admiral Noel wrote to Tuck and forwarded to him extracts from an Admiralty letter dated 25 October 1905, which stated that "it would be a convenience if the services of Mr. Oswald Tuck could be utilized in connection with the instruction in the Japanese language of Naval Officers on the China Station, having regard to his special qualifications for such work". In 1907 the Admiralty wrote to express their appreciation for Tuck's translation of a diary by a Russian officer serving on the Russian battleship Oryol.

In 1908 he was appointed as assistant to the British Naval Attaché, Captain Dundas, in Tokyo. On 13 January he received a letter from Captain Herbert King-Hall, an Assistant Director in the Naval Intelligence Department in the Admiralty, suggesting that he return to England for permanent employment in the Naval Intelligence Department. At the end of the year he decided to accept the appointment offered to him, and left Japan for the last time in his life.

== Return to England ==
He returned to England in 1909 and was attached to the Naval Ordnance Department of the Admiralty while nominally assigned to HMS President. He was eventually promoted to Instructor Commander when that rank was created in 1918, with seniority dating from 1913. During the First World War his appointment was described as 'for duty with the Naval Staff, lent to the Historical Section of the War Cabinet'. By 1921 he was Head of the Historical Section in the Training and Staff Duties Division of the Naval Staff at the Admiralty. He remained an Instructor Commander until he retired in 1924, when he was given the rank of Instructor Captain. He continued to work on the volumes of the official naval history of the Great War until 1937, in the capacity of Technical Assistant in the Historical Section of the Committee of Imperial Defence. On the strength of his work as a historian, in 1934 he applied to the University of Cambridge when the position of Vere Harmsworth Professor of Imperial and Naval History fell vacant, but it was in the end offered to a man he asked to be his referee, Admiral Sir Herbert Richmond.

== Japanese studies and life in Japan ==
Tuck first visited Japan in November 1900 and was immediately enthusiastic. He wrote to his future wife: 'I take back every word I have said against the Japanese; they are the most delightful people on the face of the earth. It is a perfect joy to go into a shop for the mere object of talking to the owner. Everyone has the most engaging way with them – and all merely for politeness, not for the sake of what they can get out of you.' He started 'struggling with Japanese' right away and by February of the following year he was already confident enough to write, 'I can now talk well enough to go about the country alone and I shall certainly do so when we get there; being able to eat the food of the country renders me quite independent.'.

In 1902, when HMS Goliath was stationed in Hong Kong, he continued to extend his knowledge of Japan by reading Lafcadio Hearn's Glimpses of unfamiliar Japan (1894) and The Mikado's Empire by William Elliot Griffis (1876). He was also practicing his Japanese with a young man named Tajima, and asked the Japanese consul to help find him a teacher. In May HMS Goliath put in to Yokohama and Tuck received the Admiral's permission to rejoin the ship at Nagasaki after travelling by train and boat to Beppu in Kyushu and then walking from there to Nagasaki. In the event he had to retrace his steps and rejoin the ship at Miyajima. By October, after a spell at Weihaiwei, the Goliath returned to Yokoyama and Tuck applied for leave to remain in Japan for four months to learn Japanese. He was permitted to bring on board a young Japanese man as a servant, Kondō Takezō: with Kondō he began learning Chinese characters. The Admiral rejected his application, saying that his job was to instruct midshipmen. He reapplied, and forwarded to the Admiral with a letter from H. Kirino, the acting Japanese consul in Hong Kong, saying, ‘I do hereby certify that Mr. Oswald T. Tuck RN of HMS Goliath can now speak Japanese tolerably well and after one year’s exclusive study there is no doubt of the possibility of his expert talking of the same.’

In 1908, when he was living in Japan as assistant to the British Naval Attaché, Captain Dundas, he began translating the confidential Japanese history of the Russo-Japanese War into English. He also spent a lot of time with Kikutake Jitsuzō (1889–1946), a young student. Kikutake later graduated with a degree in Mongolian from Tokyo University of Foreign Studies and then worked on the South Manchurian Railway in Manchukuo, the Japanese puppet state in north China.

== Japanese translation and historical work ==
After his return to England in 1909, he continued with his translation of the confidential Japanese history of the Russo-Japanese War and became assistant to the naval historian Sir Julian Corbett, who used his translation to write Maritime Operations in the Russo-Japanese War 1904–5. In the preface Corbett wrote: 'In everything that concerns the fleet a fresh examination of all the available authorities has been made. Foremost among them is the minute and exhaustive history prepared by the Japanese Naval Staff, which, though strictly confidential, has been courteously placed at the disposal of the Admiralty by the Japanese Government for the use of naval officers only. A translation, made by Naval Instructor Oswald T. Tuck, R. N., by direction of the Naval Intelligence Division, exists at the Admiralty and it is this work which is cited as the Japanese Confidential History'.

Up to 1937 he continued to translate and write historical monographs for the Navy, though none of these were published. According to Major E. Y. Daniel of the Royal Marine Light Infantry, who was assistant to Sir Julian Corbett and wrote a reference for Tuck in 1923, Tuck also wrote extensively of the Japanese role in the Great War. He also played an active part in the Japan Society, which he joined as a life member in 1909: he served on the Council and gave lectures on a variety of subjects in the 1920s and 1930s.

== Censorship ==
In September 1939 Tuck came out of retirement and was appointed Assistant Press Censor in Japanese at the Ministry of Information, serving under Arthur Waley, the scholar and translator of Chinese and Japanese. Tuck's knowledge of Japanese was put to use checking the dispatches that Japanese journalists based in London were sending back to Japan. In December 1941, after the outbreak of the Pacific War, Japanese journalists and other Japanese citizens in Britain were interned on the Isle of Man, so there was no further need for his services as a censor. The head of Press Censorship therefore offered Tuck's services to the Admiralty on 16 December and on 22 December Tuck had an interview with Colonel John Tiltman, who had decided to experiment with 6-month courses in Japanese to meet wartime needs for cryptanalysts at Bletchley Park. On 2 January 1942 Tuck met Commander Alastair Denniston, the head of Government Code and Cypher School at Bletchley Park, and he visited Bletchley on 13 January.

== Bedford Japanese School ==
Colonel Tiltman states that he had been advised to recruit students with scholarships to study the Classics at Oxford and Cambridge, and for this purpose he approached Dr Alexander Lindsay, the Master of Balliol College, Oxford, and Mr Martin Charlesworth, the President of St John's College, Cambridge. In fact, whereas most students studying scientific subjects or modern languages had already been called up for special war service, nobody had yet thought of a use for classicists, so Tiltman could take his pick of the best. The candidates were interviewed in January 1942 and the first class assembled in the Inter-Services Special Intelligence School at Bedford on 2 February. The few available dictionaries and textbooks all belonged to Tuck himself, and the course was devised by him in order to convey the essentials of the formal military Japanese that the students would later be handling. The course ended on 27 June after a little less than five months, but the results had been beyond all expectations and it was decided to recruit for a second course. After finishing the course the 22 men and one woman were sent to the Naval Section at Bletchley Park, to the Military Wing at Bletchley Park, to the Air Section at Bletchley Park or to the Foreign Office intelligence unit in Berkeley Street, London. Some of them were later sent out to Colombo, New Delhi or Mauritius, where they worked as translators and/or cryptanalysts at wireless intercept stations.

The second course began in August 1942 and from this point on Tuck was assisted by some of his most able students from the first course, particularly Eric Ceadel, who in 1947 became the first lecturer in Japanese at Cambridge University. The succession of courses ended with the eleventh course, which began on 5 May 1945 and ended on 10 November. By that time the war was over, so the projected courses 12 and 13 were cancelled. Tuck was asked to write a history of the Bedford Japanese School, and on 7 December 1945 Frank Birch, the Deputy Director of the Government Code & Cypher School, wrote to acknowledge receipt of Tuck's account: ‘What you haven’t said in your history (but, thank goodness, it sticks out a mile) is your tremendous triumph over wrongheaded experts, red tape, neglect and almost impossible conditions. The tremendous value of your contribution and its great significance in the total British effort in the Japanese war – that, I hope, will be recognised in the G.C.C.S. histories (it certainly will in the Naval history) now being written.’

In all more than 220 students were trained at the Bedford Japanese School, including nine women. After the war some returned to their former pursuits, such as Hugh Lloyd-Jones, who became Regius Professor of Greek at Oxford and was knighted, and Maurice Wiles, who became Regius Professor of Divinity at Oxford. Others abandoned their former interests and became sinologists or japanologists, such as David Hawkes, later Professor of Chinese at Oxford, Geoffrey Bownas, later Professor of Japanese at Sheffield University, and Albert Richard Davis, who became Professor of Chinese at Sydney University. Some became famous for other reasons, such as Denise Newman, who served as the only female skipper in the Royal Navy Auxiliary Service for eight years, and sailed single-handed across the Atlantic in 1988 at the age of 64, and Wilfrid Noyce, who was a member of the 1953 British Everest Expedition and later died in a mountaineering accident in the Pamirs.

== Final years ==
In 1946 Tuck was asked to take charge of a group of men who were required to translate captured Japanese materials at the Royal Naval College, Greenwich, and this lasted from 6 March to 22 November. Some had been students at Bedford Japanese School, while others had learnt Japanese in the Naval Section at Bletchley Park. During the year several of his former students from Bedford came to visit him, and in May he visited both Oxford and Cambridge where his former students, now back at university, were his hosts at commemorative dinners. Like others who worked at Bletchley Park during the war, Tuck received no honours or recognition after the war. He was, however, warmly appreciated by his former pupils: Eric Ceadel continued to write to him from Cambridge, and David Goldberg, one of the many Jews at Bedford and Bletchley Park wrote, ‘I should like you to accept the little book enclosed herewith as a token of my thanks to you for the past six months so pleasantly spent in Bedford, and especially for helping me to keep our Jewish religious observances throughout the period.’ A year after Tuck's death Ceadel, in a lecture at the Japan Society, wrote movingly of his memories of Tuck:

'The late Captain Oswald T. Tuck RN, who died early last year, meant much to me, for it was he who instructed me in Japanese. Over 200 of his wartime students will always treasure a clear memory of his erect and dignified figure, with white hair and beard, and of his fine qualities of mind and character. In a quiet but effective manner he drew the interest of his students, and succeeded in imparting to them not only the basis of the Japanese language, but also an understanding and appreciation of many faces of Japanese literature, art and life.'

== Family ==
On 25 July 1912 Tuck married Florence Jane Peglar (1873–1956): in his letters he referred to her as Florrie and then, after they were married, as Peggy. They had two children, Eleanor Margery (1913–1984, married surname Vincent-Townend) and Sylvia Catherine (1920–2006, married surname Crotty).

== Publications ==
- 'Some Comic Medieval Plays of Japan', Transactions and Proceedings of the Japan Society, vol.XXI (28 Nov.1923).
- 'A Post-war Japanese Play',Transactions and Proceedings of the Japan Society, vol.XXIII (29 April 1926.)
- 'Jitsuzo – a study of a student', Transactions and Proceedings of the Japan Society, vol.XXVIII (1931).
- 'Kyogen: the Comic Drama of Japan', Transactions and Proceedings of the Japan Society, vol. XXXV (1938).
- 'Japanese Nightingales', Transactions and Proceedings of the Japan Society, vol.XXXVI (1938).

== Sources ==
- Ceadel, Eric, 'Impressions of post-war Japan', Transactions and Proceedings of the Japan Society, vol.XXXVIII (1951).
- Christie Papers (Papers of Sir William Christie, Astronomer Royal): in Royal Greenwich Observatory Archives, Cambridge University Library.
- Corbett, Sir Julian, Maritime Operations in the Russo-Japanese War 1904–5 (2 vols.; printed by the Admiralty in 1914–15 and originally classified as secret; first published for public release in 1994 by the Naval Institute Press, Annapolis)
- Jarvis, Sue, ‘Captain Oswald Tuck R.N. and the Bedford Japanese School’, in Hugh Cortazzi, ed., Britain and Japan: biographical portraits, vol. 5 (Folkestone: Global Oriental, 2005), pp. 196–208.
- Kornicki, Peter Francis, Captain Oswald Tuck and the Bedford Japanese School, 1942–1945 (London: Pollino Publishing, 2019).
- Kornicki, Peter Francis, Eavesdropping on the Emperor: Interrogators and Codebreakers in Britain's War with Japan (London: Hurst & Co., 2021).
- O’Connor, Bernard, The Bedford spy school (Lulu, 2012),
- Tiltman, Brigadier John. H., ‘Some reminiscences’ (ca. 1965–68): typescript marked ‘TOP SECRET TRINE’ in National Archives and Records Administration, USA (NR4632 ZEMA37 38221 19390000; National Archives identifier 2811397).
- Tuck, Oswald, The Bedford Japanese School: Tuck's typescript is contained in the Tuck Papers 5/5 in Churchill Archive Centre, Churchill College, Cambridge. A complete and annotated transcription is included in Kornicki 2019.
- Tuck Papers (Papers of Oswald Tuck): in Churchill Archive Centre, Churchill College, Cambridge.
