= Joseph Bowles =

English librarian

Joseph Bowles (1692 or 1693 – 1729) was an English librarian, who served as Bodley's Librarian, the head of the Bodleian Library at the University of Oxford, from 1719 until his death.

== Information ==
Bowles, from Shaftesbury, Dorset, matriculated at the University of Oxford as a member of Hart Hall on 23 June 1713 at the age of 19, obtaining his Bachelor of Arts degree, from St Mary Hall in January 1717. He became a Fellow of Oriel in 1719, and was appointed as Bodley's Librarian in the same year. He died in 1729 at the age of 34. He was said to have been "unequal to the position he obtained."
