= Edmund Craster =

British Librarian

Sir Herbert Henry Edmund Craster (5 November 1879 – 21 March 1959) was a British librarian, who served as Bodley's Librarian (the librarian in charge of the Bodleian Library at the University of Oxford) from 1931 to 1945.

== Life ==
Edmund Craster was educated at Clifton College and Balliol College, Oxford. He became a Fellow of All Souls College, Oxford in 1903, and edited the History of Northumberland (volumes 8 to 10) between 1904 and 1914. He was appointed Sub-Librarian of the Bodleian Library in 1912, also serving as Keeper of Western Manuscripts from 1927, until 1931 when he became Bodley's Librarian. He left in 1945, the year in which he received his knighthood, and became the Librarian of All Souls in 1946. His writings included Speeches on Foreign Policy by Lord Halifax in 1940 and a History of the Bodleian Library 1845–1945 in 1952. He died on 21 March 1959.
