= Humphrey Owen =

British academic

- Born: 1702
- Died: March 26, 1768 (aged 65–66)
- Burial place: Jesus College, Oxford

Humphrey Owen (1702 – 26 March 1768) was the Principal of Jesus College, Oxford, from 1763 to his death.

Owen studied at Jesus College from 1718 to 1722 and was elected as a Fellow in 1725. He was Rector of Tredington 1744–63. In 1747 he was appointed Bodley's Librarian, and continued to hold this post when appointed Principal in 1763. In that same year, he was awarded his D.D. and was appointed to the parish of Rotherfield Peppard. He died in 1768 and was buried in the college chapel.
