= Denise Newman (diver) =

British diver (1924–2016)

Personal information
- National team: United Kingdom
- Born: 19 February 1924; Hornsey, Great Britain
- Died: 22 January 2016 (aged 91)

Sport
- Sport: Diving

Denise Newman (later Denise St Aubyn Hubbard; 19 February 1924 – 22 January 2016) was a British diver who competed in the 1948 Summer Olympics.

== Early life ==
She was born on 19 February 1924 in Hornsey, London. Her father was Percy Arthur Newman, a shipping clerk and manager of Anglo-Iranian Oil, and her mother was Jessie Bathurst, née Pearce. She had one brother, Derek. Newman grew up in Maadi, Egypt, where she began as a swimmer, breaking senior national records in the 50 metres and 100 metres freestyle at the open Egyptian championships in 1937 while still a junior. She was taught by her mother and Ahmed Ibrahim Kamel.

== Career ==
She was due to compete as a swimmer in the 1940 Summer Olympics, until it was cancelled at the outbreak of World War II. Her family lived in Abadan, Iran from 1939 to 1941. When they returned to the UK in 1942, she applied to the Air Ministry and was referred to the Foreign Office. Owing to her linguistic talents, she was sent to the secret Bedford Japanese School run by Captain Oswald Tuck RN and completed the 5th course (August 1943 to February 1944). She was subsequently posted to the Military Wing at the Government Code and Cypher School, Bletchley Park where she worked as part of the Japanese codebreaking team. On 10 August 1945, she married Vyvyan Alexander St Aubyn Hubbard, a major in the Indian Army and architect. They had two children, Hugh and Geraldine.

At the 1948 Summer Olympics in London, Newman was part of Great Britain's team in the 10 metre diving event. By the third dive she was in fifth place, but tore a shoulder muscle. She continued with one arm disabled, finishing 11th out of 15 competitors.

Newman became interested in sailing when her family moved to Chichester in 1953. In 1978 she joined the Royal Naval Auxiliary Service, and for eight years was the only female skipper of a British warship. In 1988, aged 64, she completed the Transatlantic single-handed sailing race, in 34 days. Her participation was the subject of a BBC documentary.

She died on 22 January 2016 at the age of 91.
