= Richard Fifoot =

Erik Richard Sidney Fifoot, MC (14 June 1925 – 24 June 1992) was a British librarian who served as Bodley's Librarian, the head of the Bodleian Library at the University of Oxford, from 1979 to 1981.

== Life ==
The son of Hjördis Baars and her husband C. H. S. Fifoot, Richard Fifoot was educated at Berkhamsted School and the University of Oxford. He served as a lieutenant in the Coldstream Guards between 1943 and 1946, winning the Military Cross. He worked at the library of the University of Leeds from 1950 to 1958 (initially as Assistant Librarian, then as Sub-Librarian from 1952), becoming Deputy Librarian of the University of Nottingham in 1958 and Librarian of the University of Edinburgh in 1960. He was appointed Bodley's Librarian in 1979 and also held a Professorial Fellowship at Exeter College, Oxford. He retired in 1981.

He was chairman of the Standing Conference of National and University Libraries from 1979 to 1981, as well as a member of the executive board of the International Federation of Library Associations and Institutions from 1979 to 1983. He founded Three Rivers Books Ltd, and was a director from 1981 to 1990. His writings included A Bibliography of Edith, Osbert and Sacheverell Sitwell (1963, 1971).
