= Reginald Carr (librarian) =

- Birth name: Reginald Philip Carr
- Born: 20 February 1946 (age 79)

Reginald Philip Carr (born 20 February 1946) is an English librarian, who was Bodley's Librarian (head of the Bodleian Library at the University of Oxford) from 1997 until his retirement in 2006. He is a member of the Christadelphian church.

== Life and writings ==
Carr was born in Manchester and educated at Manchester Grammar School before studying French and German at the University of Leeds (obtaining a Bachelor of Arts degree in 1968 with first class honours) and the University of Manchester (obtaining a Master of Arts degree in 1971). He worked as an Assistant Librarian in the John Rylands University Library of Manchester between 1970 and 1976, and was also Librarian-in-Charge of the School of Education Library at Manchester from 1972 to 1976. After two years as Sub-Librarian (Reader Services) at the University of Surrey, he was Deputy Librarian at the University of Aston (1978 to 1980) and of the University of Cambridge (1980 to 1986). Between 1986 and 1996, Carr was University Librarian and Keeper of the Brotherton Collection in the University of Leeds, before being appointed as the 23rd holder of the position of Bodley's Librarian in Oxford from January 1997. In 2000 he established Oxford University Library Services, a new organisation that formally integrated Oxford's centrally-funded libraries, and he was its first director. Other work during his time as Director of Oxford University Library Services and Bodley's Librarian included setting up the Oxford Digital Library, extending the scope of legal deposit to cover electronic publications, and significant work on buildings and fundraising. During his time as Bodley's Librarian, he was also a Fellow of Balliol College, Oxford. He retired in December 2006, and was given the title of Bodley's Librarian Emeritus. A book of essays in his honour was published in 2008.

In retirement Carr continued until 2010 as a Member of the Harvard University Library Visiting Committee, and until 2012 as a Trustee of the Chawton House Library and as a Member of the Council of Management of the Friends of the Bodleian Library. Since 2007 he has served as the Book Editor for The Testimony magazine, and in 2011 he edited a special issue of the magazine to commemorate the 400th anniversary of the publication of the Authorised Version of the Bible.

Carr's academic and professional publications include Anarchism in France: the case of Octave Mirbeau (1977) (based on his M.A. thesis), The Mandrake Press, 1929-30 (Cambridge University Library, 1985), An Introduction to University Library Administration (Clive Bingley, 1987, joint publication) and The Academic Research Library in a Decade of Change (Chandos, 2007), as well as numerous articles in both professional and academic journals. He has co-authored a comprehensive analysis of the use of the word 'Spirit' in the New Testament, and has written a study guide to the Biblical book of Micah, a collection of essays on Christadelphian faith, life and history, and several tracts about issues of Christian faith (The Miracle of the Bible: The word of God in print and The Christian and Politics).
