= Henry Coxe =

English librarian and scholar

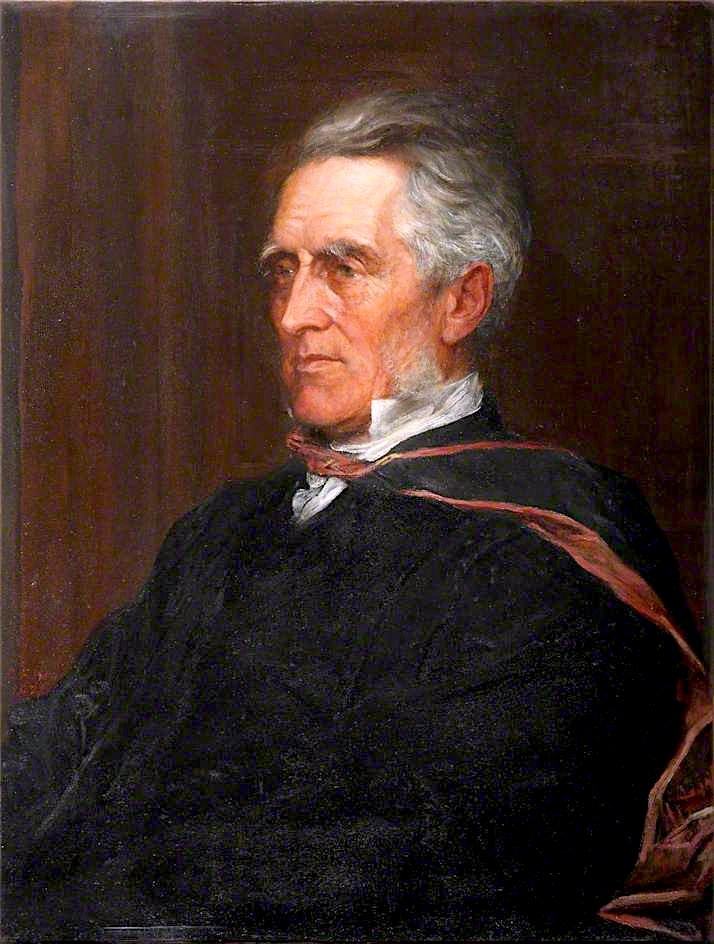
- Born: 20 September 1811; Bucklebury
- Died: 8 July 1881 (aged 69); Oxford
- Alma mater: Worcester College
- Occupation: Librarian; scholar
- Employer: Bodleian Library (1839–1881); British Museum (1833–1838)
- Spouse(s): Charlotte Esther Turner

Henry Octavius Coxe (20 September 1811 in Bucklebury, Berkshire, England – 8 July 1881 in Oxford) was an English librarian and scholar.

The eighth son of Rev. Richard Coxe and Susan Smith, he was educated at Westminster School and Worcester College, Oxford. Immediately on taking his degree in 1833, he began work in the manuscript department of the British Museum, became in 1838 sub-librarian of the Bodleian Library in Oxford, and in 1860 succeeded Dr. Bulkeley Bandinel as head librarian, an office he held until his death in 1881.

Having proved himself an able palaeographer, he was sent out by the British government under Henry John Temple, 3rd Viscount Palmerston to inspect the libraries in the monasteries of the Levant in 1857. He discovered some valuable manuscripts, but the monks were too wise to part with their treasures. One valuable result of his travels was the detection of the forgery attempted by Constantine Simonides. He was the author of various catalogues, and under his direction that of the Bodleian, in more than 720 volumes, was completed. He published Rogri de Wendover Chronica, 5 vols (1841–44); the Black Prince, an historical poem written in French by Chandos Herald (1842); and Report on the Greek Manuscripts yet remaining in the Libraries of the Levant (1858).

He was not only an accurate librarian but an active and hardworking clergyman, and was for the last twenty-five years of his life in charge of the parish of Wytham, near Oxford. He was likewise honorary fellow of Worcester and Corpus Christi.

In 1839 he married Charlotte Esther, daughter of Tomkyns Hilgrove Turner, and fathered five children, of whom Susan Esther (1842–1894) married John Wordsworth, future Bishop of Salisbury.
