= List of University Librarians at the University of Cambridge =

This is a list of University Librarians of Cambridge University Library at the University of Cambridge.

The official office of Librarian of the University was not established until 1577, when William James was appointed Librarian. The first set of regulations “for the Office of keeping the Library” were then formed in 1582. Little is known of the administration before the late sixteenth century. Before 1577 the University Chaplain had overall responsibility of the Library amongst other duties. 16 potential Chaplain-Librarians have been identified.

In 1721 the post of Principal Librarian (Protobibliothecarius) was created for Conyers Middleton "as a mark of sympathy with him in his opposition to Richard Bentley". In 1828 this post was merged with that of Librarian (Bibliothecarius).

== Chaplain-Librarians, –1577 ==
- Roger de Thornton (1278–)
- Adam de Flixton (1285?–)
- Thurstan de Hunyngham (1335–)
- William de Alderford (1347–)
- Robert Tey (1406–)
- John Parys(1420–)
- Thomas Stoyle (1456–)
- John Otteley (1473–)
- William Thomson (1484–)
- Robert Chapell (1497–)
- John Hostibie (1510–)
- Hugh Latimer (1522–)
- Nicholas Heath (1529–)
- Nicholas Ridley (1532–)
- Alban Langdale (1540?–)
- John Dale (1554–)
- John Stokes (1556–)

== University Librarian (Bibliothecarius), –1828 ==
- William James (1577–1581)
- Richard Moodie (1581–?)
- Henry Frogge (1583–1587)
- John Matthew (1587–1594)
- Gabriel Duckett or Gregory Ducket (1594–1623)
- Thomas Brooke (1623–1629)
- Abraham Wheelocke (1629–1653)
- William Moore (1653–1659)
- ?James Fenton (1655–?)
- Thomas Smith (1659–1661)
- Isaac Dobson (1661–1668)
- Robert Peachy (1667–1683)
- James Manfield (1684–1686)
- John Laughton (1686–1712)
- Philip Brooke (1712–1718)
- Thomas Macro (1718–1721)
- Samuel Hadderton (1721–1731)
- John Taylor (1732–1734)
- Thomas Parne (1734–1751)
- Stephen Whisson (1751–1783)
- John Davies (1783–1817)
- Edward Daniel Clarke (1817–1822)
- John Lodge (1822–1845)

== Principal Librarian (Protobibliothecarius), 1721–1828 ==
- Conyers Middleton (1721–1750)
- Edmund Law (1760–1769)
- John Barnardiston (1769–1778)
- Richard Farmer (1778–1797)
- Thomas Kerrich (1797–1828) ?and Philip Douglas (1797-?)
- John Lodge (1828–1845)

== University Librarian, 1845–present ==
- Joseph Power (1845–1864)
- John Eyton Bickersteth Mayor (1863–1867)
- Henry Bradshaw (1867–1886)
- William Robertson Smith (1886–1889)
- Francis Jenkinson (1889–1923)
- A. F. Scholfield (1923–1949)
- Harry Creswick (1949–1967)
- Eric Bertrand Ceadel (1967–1979)
- Frederick William Ratcliffe (1980–1994)
- Peter Fox (1994–2009)
- Anne Jarvis (2009–2016)
- Professor Christopher Young (2016-2017) Acting University Librarian
- Jessica Gardner (2017–)
