= Cambridge University Council =

Institution of the University of Cambridge

Coordinates: 52°12′19″N 0°7′1″E

The Council (in law the Council of the Senate) of the University of Cambridge is, by statute, the principal executive and policy-making body of the University, having responsibility for the administration of the University, for the planning of its work and for the management of its resources. The main constitutional responsibility of the Council is the preparation of Graces (resolutions that, if approved, make University legislation or authorise executive action) for submission to the Regent House, the governing body of the University. The Council is accountable to the Regent House through a variety of statutory checks and balances. It has the right of reporting to the University and is obliged to advise the Regent House on matters of general concern to the University. It performs both functions by authorising notices to be published in the Cambridge University Reporter, its official journal.

Cambridge University is an exempt charity, under the Charities Act 2011 regulated by the Office for Students. Under charity law its trustees are members of the University Council.

== Membership ==
Membership of the council consists of the Chancellor and Vice-Chancellor of Cambridge University (the chancellor, primarily a ceremonial post, is appointed for ten years, while the vice-chancellor is de facto the Chair of the University), nineteen elected members, and four appointed members, divided into classes as follows:

1. Four from among the Heads of Colleges
2. Four from among the Professors, Clinical Professors, Readers and Professors (Grade 11)
3. Eight from among the other members of the Regent House
4. Three students: ex-officio the President (Undergraduate) and President (Postgraduate) of the Cambridge Students' Union as well as an independently-elected current student
5. Four (external members) who are not members of the Regent House or employees of the University or Colleges

== Present membership ==
Position	Name	Term Ending
Chancellor*	Lord Smith of Finsbury	22 July 2035
Vice-Chancellor	Dr Deborah Prentice, CHR	30 September 2029
Heads of Colleges
Master of Christ's	Lord McDonald of Salford, CHR	31 December 2028
Master of St John's	Ms Heather Hancock, JN	31 December 2026
Master of Fitzwilliam	Baroness Morgan of Huyton, F	31 December 2028
Master of Clare Hall	Mr C. Alan Short, CLH	31 December 2026
Professors, Clinical Professors, Readers and Professors (Grade 11)
Professor of Statistical Science for Health	Dr Daniela De Angelis	31 December 2028
Professor of Computing and Human Data Interaction	Dr Richard Mortier, CHR	31 December 2026
Hibbitt Professor of Solid Mechanics	Dr Garth Wells, JE	31 December 2028
Professor of Early Modern Literature and Culture	Dr Jason Scott-Warren, CAI	31 December 2026
Other members of the Regent House
University Senior Lecturer, MRC Biostatistics Unit	Dr William Astle	31 December 2028
Deputy Director of Research Services, Research Office	Dr Joanna Dekkers	31 December 2026
Bursar of Darwin	Mr John Dix, DAR	31 December 2026
Associate Professor (Grade 10), Department of Politics and International Studies	Dr Pieter van Houten, CHU	31 December 2028
Perne Librarian, Peterhouse	Mr Scott Mandelbrote, PET	31 December 2026
Associate Professor (Grade 10), Department of Chemical Engineering and Biotechnology	Dr Ewa Marek, JE	31 December 2028
Professor (Grade 11) of the Sociology of Media and Technology	Professor Ella McPherson, Q	31 December 2028
Margaret Anstee Fellow, Newnham College	Dr Mezna Qato, N	31 December 2026
Student members
President (Undergraduate), Cambridge Students' Union	Mr Matthew Copeman, F	
President (Postgraduate), Cambridge Students' Union	Mr Augustin Dennis, W	
University Councillor	Mr Darragh O'Reilly, Q	
External members
	Ms Gaenor Bagley	
	Professor Sir Alex Halliday	
	Professor Andrew Wathey	
	Mr Stephen Wilson	

* The Chancellor is not expected to attend meetings

By statute the Chair (in law the President) of the Council is the Vice-Chancellor in the absence of the Chancellor, who by convention does not attend meetings of the Council.

The Secretary of the Council is the Registrary, the principal administrative officer of the University, who has a statutory duty to keep a record of the proceedings of the University.

=== External members ===
From January 2005, the membership of the council included two external members. The Regent House voted to increase the number of external members from two to four in March 2008, being approved by The Queen in July 2008.

== Meetings ==
The council normally meets twice per term and twice in the Long Vacation. It now rarely meets in the Council Room at the Old Schools, instead meeting at the offices of Cambridge University Press and Assessment. However, the COVID-19 pandemic caused meetings to be held via Zoom.
