= Cambridge University Reporter =

English university journal

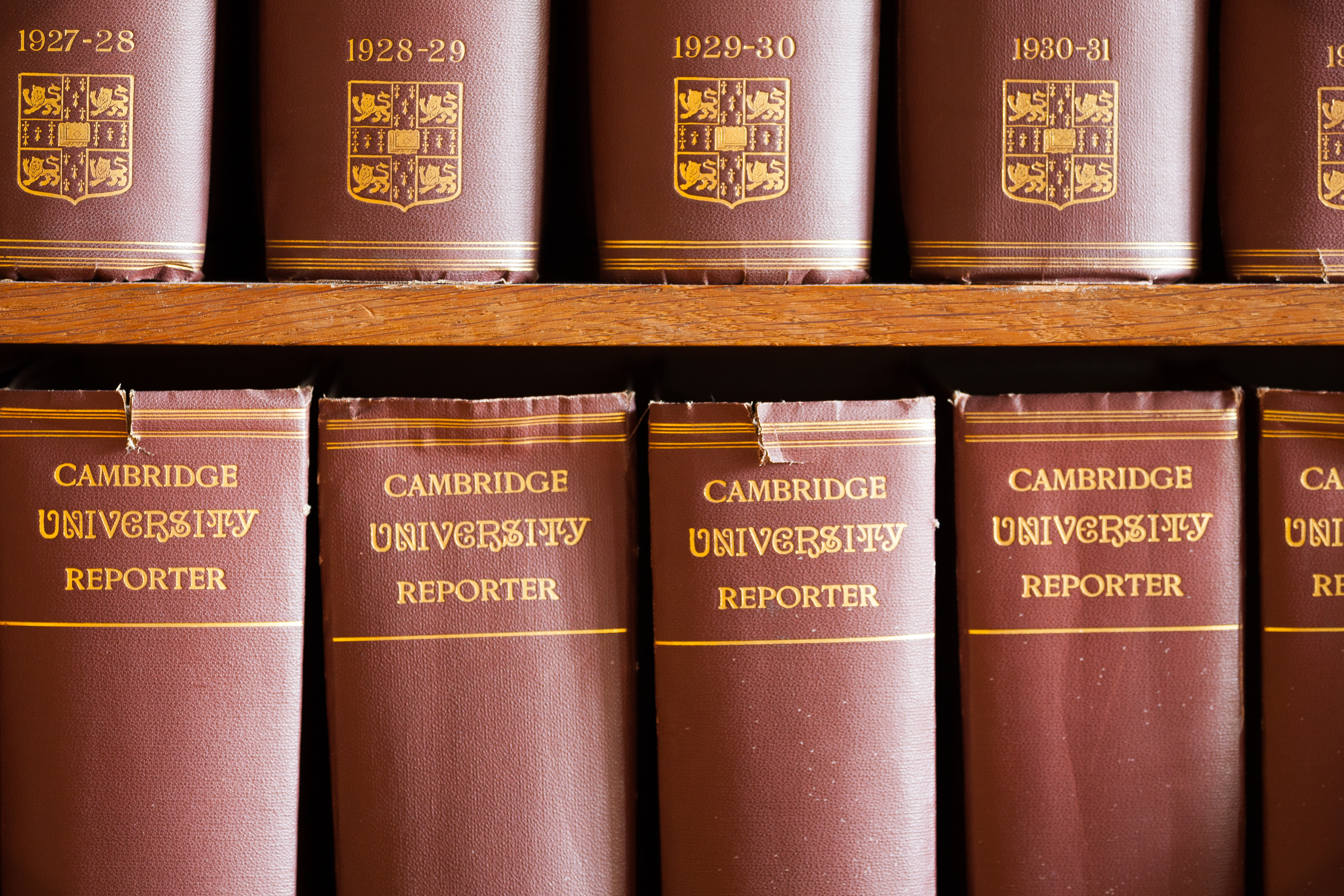
Cambridge University Reporter volumes at Madingley Hall

The Cambridge University Reporter, founded in 1870, is the official journal of record of the University of Cambridge, England.

== Overview ==
The Cambridge University Reporter appears within the university and online every Wednesday during Full Term, carrying notices of all university business. This includes announcements of university events, proposals for changes in regulations, Council and General Board decisions, as well as information on awards, scholarships and appointments (both at Cambridge and other universities).

The weekly numbers are supplemented by special numbers, which contain additional information of use or information to members of the university, but not included in the weekly editions. These special numbers include the Lecture List, published at the start of the Michaelmas term and giving details of all the year's lectures; the Awards issue, which comes out in early November, and gives details of all available awards and grants; and the Class-Lists, published in August, which contains details of the Tripos results for all students at the university.

== Publication ==
Numbers of the Reporter are published at the discretion of the Registrary. Each issue of the Reporter bears the line "Published By Authority", referring to the fact that in its official part, it contains only university notices issued by authority, that is to say, by those university bodies which have a right of reporting to the university (these include the Council, the Board of Scrutiny, and any board or syndicate constituted by statute or ordinance or by grace of Regent House).

In its unofficial part, the Reporter contains Reports of Discussions; notices of non placet of Graces; notices not authorized for inclusion in the official part; notices by the colleges; notices of learned societies; and advertisements.

The printed edition of the Reporter is printed in Great Britain by the University Press, Cambridge, and published by Cambridge University Press. It is registered at the Post Office as a newspaper. Most of the Reporter is now also available on the Internet. However, because of the requirements of the Data Protection Act, some of the content of the online Reporter is limited to the cam.ac.uk domain, and some copies are made available only in printed form.

Copies of the Reporter are made available gratis to heads and praelectors of the colleges. Members of the university who live in Cambridge or any member of the Regent House is entitled to receive copies of the Reporter for a term and the following vacation at a reduced price. The excess of the cost of the Reporter over the Receipts is charged to the Chest.

In 2005, controversy was caused within the university when an edition of the Reporter was recalled in order to be republished with corrections.

== See also ==
- Oxford University Gazette
