= Cambridge University Library =

Main research and legal deposit library of the University of Cambridge

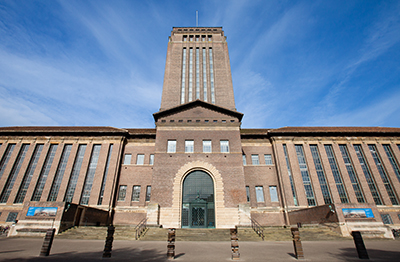
- Cambridge University Library
- 52°12′18.6″N 0°6′29″E
- Location: West Road, Cambridge, England
- Type: Academic library
- Established: Before 1416

Collection
- Items collected: books; journals; newspapers; magazines; sound and music recordings; maps, prints; drawings; manuscripts
- Size: 9,000,000 items (approx.)
- Legal deposit: Yes

Access and use
- Population served: University of Cambridge, and others
- Members: University of Cambridge (and some other groups on application)

Other information
- Director: Jessica Gardner
- Website: www.lib.cam.ac.uk

Cambridge University Library is the main research library of the University of Cambridge. It is the largest of over 100 libraries within the university. The library is a major scholarly resource for members of the University of Cambridge and external researchers. It is often referred to within the university as the UL. Thirty-three faculty and departmental libraries are associated with the University Library for the purpose of central governance and administration, forming "Cambridge University Libraries".

Cambridge University Library is one of six legal deposit libraries under UK law. It holds about 9 million items (including maps and sheet music) and, through legal deposit, purchase and donation it receives around 100,000 items every year. The University Library is unique among the legal deposit libraries in keeping a large proportion of its material on open access and in allowing some categories of reader to borrow from its collections.

Its original location was the Old Schools near the Senate House until it outgrew the space there. A new library building was constructed in the 1930s. The library took over the site of a former military hospital on the western side of Cambridge city centre, now between Robinson College and the Memorial Court of Clare College. The current building, designed by Giles Gilbert Scott, opened in 1934. The librarian, Jessica Gardner, is the second woman to hold this office.

== History ==
=== The first library ===
The Old Schools, home of the library until the 1930s, with the tower of the current library on the horizon

By the middle of the 14th century, the University of Cambridge owned a collection of books. These would have been kept in chests along with other valuables, rather than in a library building as would be recognised today.

A common university library can be traced to the beginning of the 15th century, with the first direct reference to a 'library'. In March 1416, the will of William Loring was proved, which bequeathed three volumes to the library thus: "Item volo quod omnes libri mei juris civilis remaneant in communi libraria scolarium universitatis Cantebrigg' in perpetuum."

In the second decade of the 15th century, the library found a home on the newly built Old Schools site, and when the site's west range was built in 1438 its upper floor was designated as a library, with a further library aded when the eastern wing was completed in 1473.

The earliest catalogue is dated c. 1424, at which time there were 122 volumes in the library. The second earliest surviving catalogue was drawn up in 1473, and records 330 volumes. During the English Reformation, while there does not seem to be evidence of widespread destruction of books, as there was at Oxford, some books were certainly destroyed, and there were very few donations. King's College received only one bequest between 1528 and 1568. From the 16th century, the library received generous donations or bequests of books and growth was considerably increased once the privilege of legal deposit had been granted. In 1648 the House of Commons ordered funds for the library.

In 1715, the library received a large gift of books which had been owned by Bishop John Moore, requiring it to expand into a third wing of the schools site. In 1730, it expanded to fill the entire first floor of the site when the Senate House was completed. This had been planned to be part of a new quadrangle of buildings including a purpose-built library, but due to a lawsuit from the master of Gonville and Caius College, this was never built.

In 1828, King's College completed new buildings and the university purchased its Old Court, adjacent to the Old Schools, to enable expansion of the library. The Cockerell Building, constructed in 1837–42 on the site of the former King's College dining hall on Senate House Passage, greatly expanded the library's space. This was followed by the reconstruction of the college's southern range in 1864 by Sir George Gilbert Scott, and its Western range by John Loughborough Pearson in 1878, both to enable the library to expand.

By 1903, the library occupied the whole of the Old Schools site, including the former King's College Old Court. Nevertheless, by 1918 the problem of space was again urgent and various options were considered on the site, including underground bookstores below the quadrangles, glazing over one of the quadrangles, or a new building opposite the Senate House. Instead, the decision was made to construct an entirely new library.

=== The new library ===
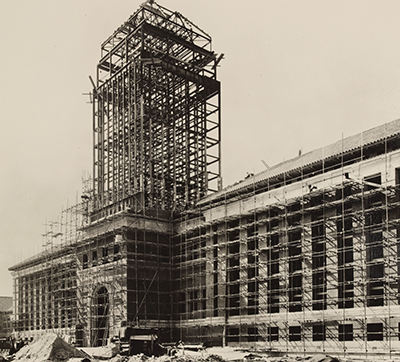
Construction of the main UL building in the 1930s

Following an initiative by A. F. Scholfield (librarian from 1923 to 1949), it was decided to build a larger facility. The site selected comprised the 8 acres (3.2 ha) joint cricket field of King's and Clare Colleges. During the First World War, a large part of the site had been requisitioned by the War Office to create the 1st Eastern General Hospital, a facility for the Royal Army Medical Corps to treat military casualties. The hospital had 1,700 beds at its height and treated some 70,000 casualties between 1914 and 1919.

The new University Library building was designed by Giles Gilbert Scott, who also designed the neighbouring Clare Memorial Court (part of Clare College). It was constructed between 1931 and 1934. It is a Grade II listed building. Inside are a number of 17th- and 18th-century bookcases including those designed for the old University Library by James Essex in 1731–34. The funds for the new library were raised by colleges and from private donors. The American philanthropist John D. Rockefeller provided the largest part of the funds for the library's construction. Sensing that it needed a grander entrance, Rockefeller persuaded the architect to add the distinctive front-facing tower. The tower can be seen for several miles around Cambridge. The bronze main entrance and the aluminium bronze screens to the reading room were made by H. H. Martyn & Co.

Book drop in a repurposed red telephone box

The building bears a resemblance to Scott's industrial architecture, including Bankside Power Station (now Tate Modern). The library tower stands 157 feet (48 m) tall, 6 feet (1.8 m) shorter than the top of St John's College Chapel and 10 feet (3.0 m) taller than the peak of King's College Chapel.

The library has been extended several times through ground annexes and underground extensions which allowed for new legal deposit documents to be stored. The main building houses the Japanese and Chinese collections in the Aoi Pavilion, an extension donated by Tadao Aoi and opened in 1998.

The University Library has also built a large storage facility in Ely which has more than 100 kilometres of shelving for future legal deposit books and periodicals. Work on a £17.1 million off-site facility to house the growing collection finished in 2018 and provides Cambridge University with one of the largest library storage buildings in the world.

In June 2022 a repurposed K6 telephone box was installed at the entrance for returning books to the Library.

== Legal deposit library ==
Cambridge University Library is one of the six legal deposit libraries under UK law, the others being the British Library, the National Library of Scotland, the National Library of Wales, the Bodleian Libraries, Oxford, and the Library of Trinity College, Dublin. Although the Irish Free State left the UK in 1922, Trinity College Dublin remains a UK deposit library and the UK libraries reciprocally retain deposit rights for Irish publications. As a legal deposit library, the University Library is entitled to claim without charge a copy of all books, journals, printed maps and music published in the United Kingdom and Ireland. This has contributed to the library's large holdings of over seven million books and 1.5 million periodicals. Between 800 and 1200 books a week are received through legal deposit.

From 6 April 2013, legal deposit also covers material published digitally and online, so that the Legal Deposit libraries can provide a national archive of the UK's non-print published material, such as websites, blogs and ejournals. Significant digitisation efforts continue as more manuscripts and early-modern books are acquired and scanned by the University of Cambridge.

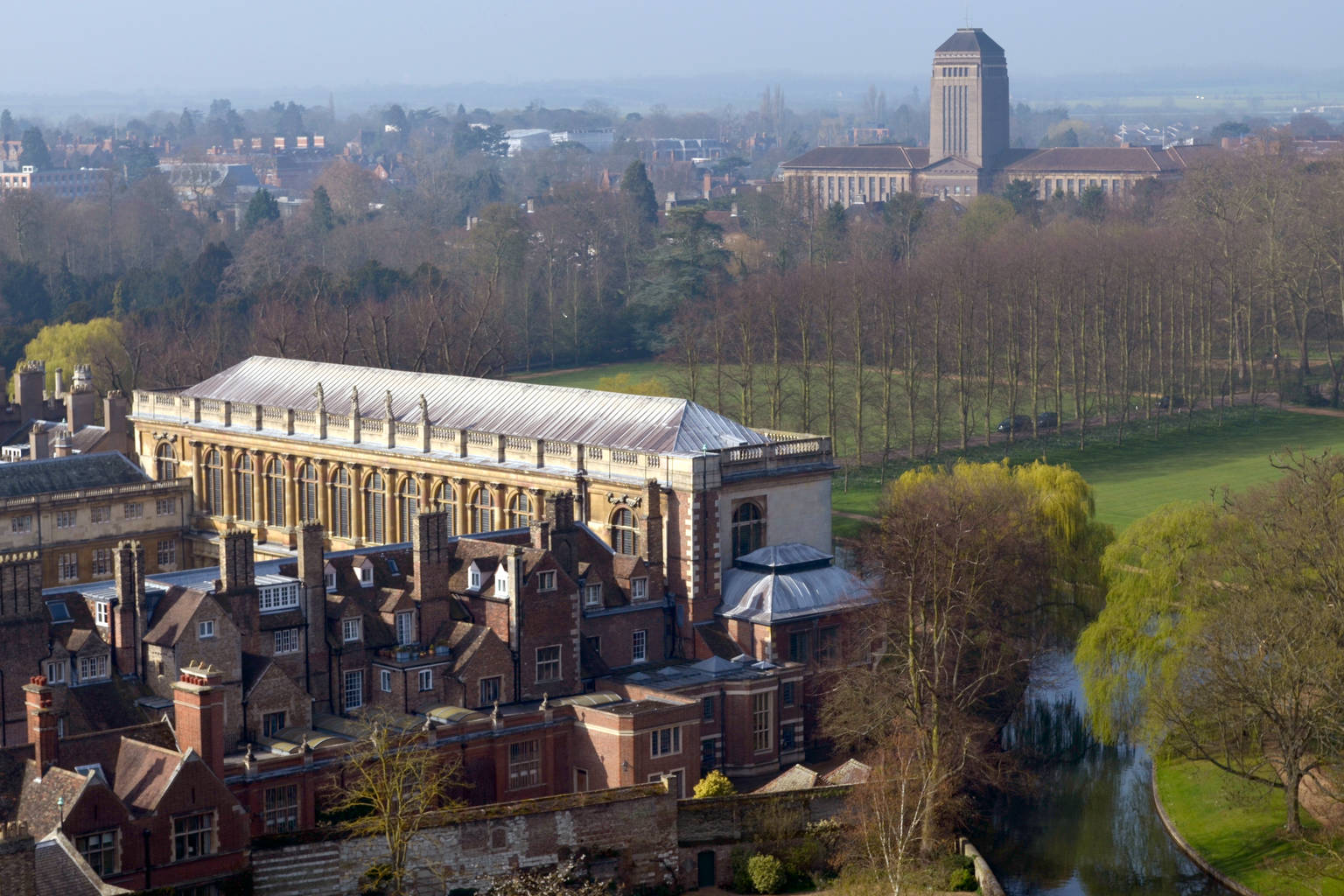
The University Library (background) and Trinity College's Wren Library (foreground), as viewed from St John's College chapel tower

== Access ==
The library is open to all members of the University of Cambridge. As is traditional among British university libraries, postgraduates and academics from other UK universities are allowed reference-only access to the library's collection, and members of the public may apply for access to use the Library for reference if their research requires access to materials held there. Students and academics from other libraries and institutions must submit a request for access before using the facilities in Cambridge.

The library is unique among the UK's legal deposit libraries in keeping a large proportion of its books on open access and in allowing some categories of reader (for example Cambridge academics, postgraduates and undergraduates) to borrow from its collection. It has a Tea Room in which meals, snacks and beverages are available. The library regularly puts on exhibitions, free to the public, and featuring items from its collections.

== Janus ==
In 2002, the library began a special project termed Janus (after the Roman god) to provide a single point of networked access to catalogues of archives and manuscript collections held throughout Cambridge. This is a major development for the Cambridge Universities Libraries, especially because Cambridge is home to more than 100 libraries and research institutes, each with their own mandate and organisational structure. A widening number of participating repositories, both University and non-University, are working together to provide comprehensive coverage of archives in the city and surrounding area. While it was running, Janus could be accessed by students and members of university both online and in-person.

At the beginning of March 2021, Janus was decommissioned and replaced by ArchiveSearch, an index of archives and finding aids for most of the archives in the city of Cambridge, including

- Cambridge University Libraries
- University faculties and museums
- The majority of the colleges of the University

== Historical Printing Room ==
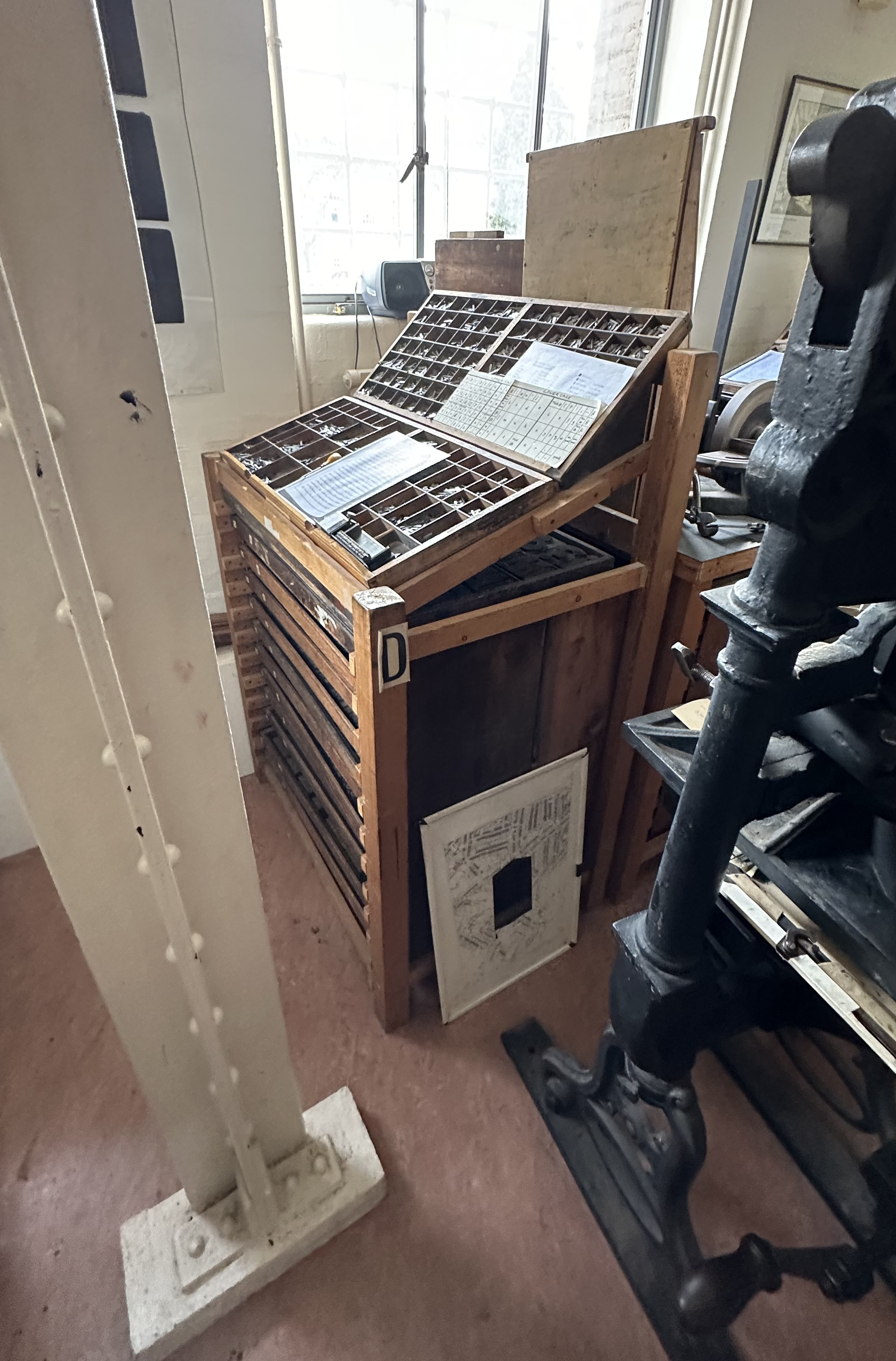
A type cabinet showing an upper case and a lower case of Ehrhardt type in the HPR

In addition to archives for some major figures in the history of typography and printing (Stanley Morison, Frances Meynell, etc), the Library hosts the Historical Printing Room.

In the early 1970s, Philip Gaskell, then librarian of Trinity College, set up a bibliographical teaching press similar to those at the Bodleian, University College London, and other institutions. The idea was to permit students to experience the historical process of letterpress printing themselves so they could better understand early book structure and the activities necessary to produce books. Classes began in 1974 and have continued to the present day.

Equipment in the HPR include Philip Gaskell's own Albion iron hand press, a small etching press, paper moulds made for William Morris, and other equipment donated or loaned by Cambridge University Press. A Common Press, constructed by the University's Engineering Department to Gaskell's specifications, is still used for demonstrations and printing. Research at the HPR is supported by significant archives at the CUL, including the Broxbourne collection of type specimens, the Chapbooks collection, and extensive archives of eminent printers.

== Digitisation project ==
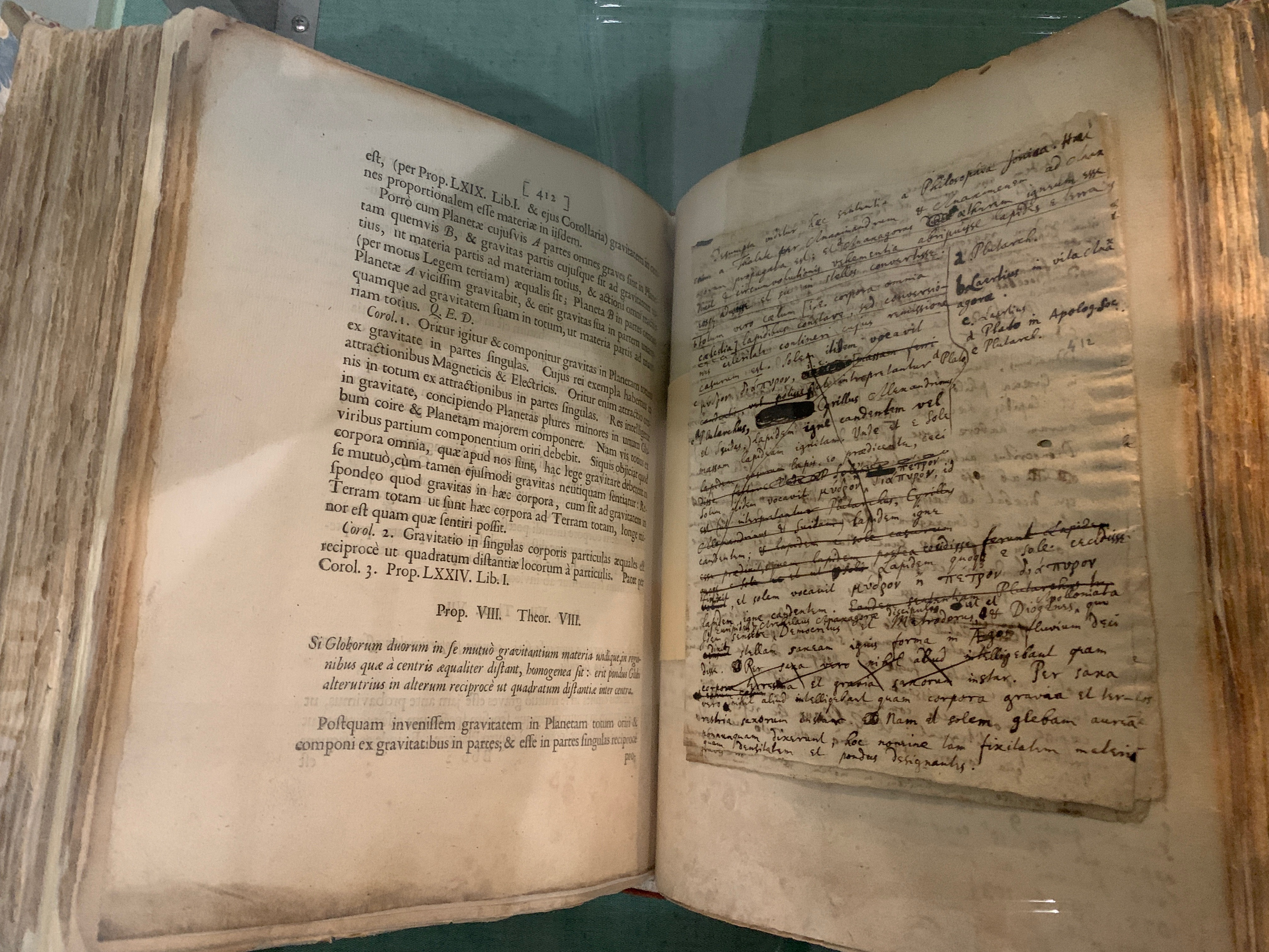
Newton's personal copy of the first edition of Philosophiæ Naturalis Principia Mathematica, annotated by him for the second edition. Displayed at the library

In June 2010, Cambridge University announced that a £1.5 million donation would allow them to start digitising some of the collections in the University Library and eventually provide access to them free of charge over the Internet via the Cambridge Digital Library website. Initially the project will focus on two collections called "The Foundations of Faith" and "The Foundations of Science", which includes writings by Isaac Newton and his contemporaries, as well as documents from the Library's archives of Christian, Islamic and Jewish texts.

== Friends of the Cambridge University Library ==
The Friends of the Cambridge University Library was established by a group of individuals, organisations and private donors who are committed to supporting the growth and development of the library. Members of the Friends regularly raise funds for future construction projects and archival restoration efforts, as well as the acquisition and purchase of rare books or manuscripts. Membership in the group is open to all alumni and members of the public interested in the preservation of knowledge and literature. Special events and tours are organised to recognise the contribution of the membership. The Friends of the Cambridge University Library has raised more than £150,000 through regular and special donations over the past five years.

== Staff ==
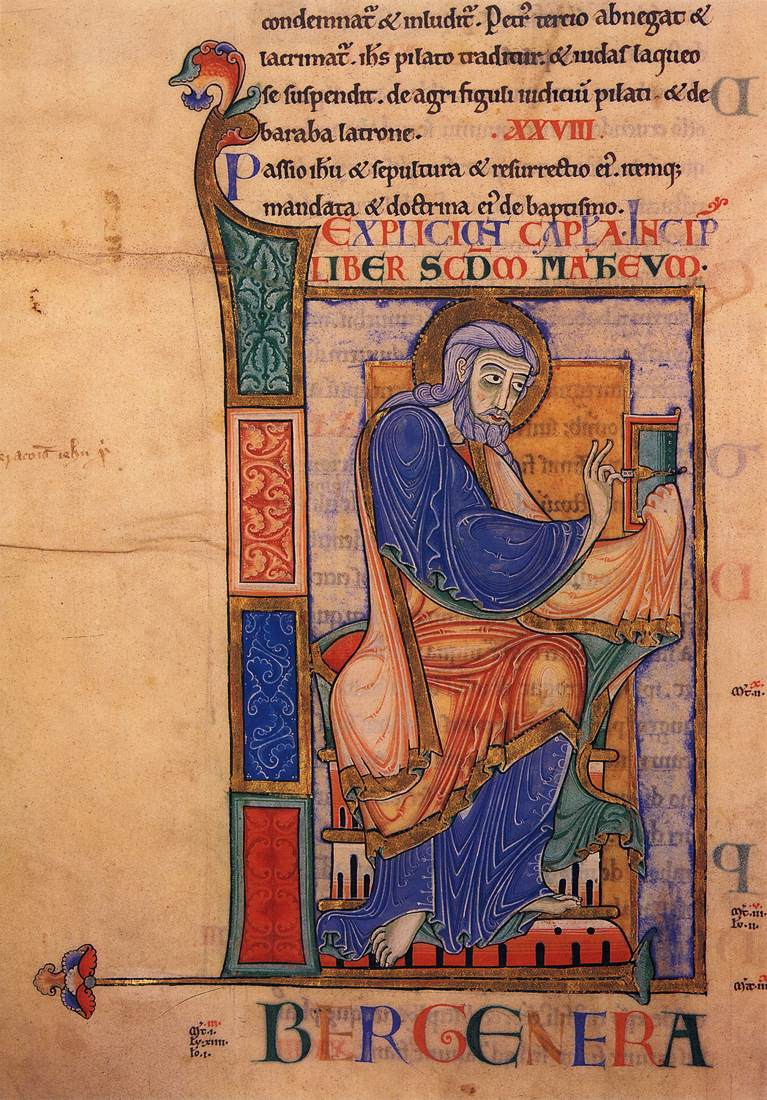
12th-century manuscript of the Dover Bible, in the Parker Library, Corpus Christi College, Cambridge.

The official office of Librarian of the university was not established until 1577, when William James was appointed Librarian. The first set of regulations "for the Office of keeping the Library" were then formed in 1582. Little is known of the administration before the late 16th century. Before 1577, the University Chaplain had overall responsibility of the Library among other duties. Sixteen potential Chaplain-Librarians have been identified.

In 1721 the post of Principal Librarian (Protobibliothecarius) was created for Conyers Middleton "as a mark of sympathy with him in his opposition to Richard Bentley". In 1828 this post was merged with that of Librarian (Bibliothecarius).

Various scholars have held the position. Abraham Wheelocke was librarian of the "Public Library" at Cambridge University, and was also Reader in Anglo-Saxon in the 17th century. Augustus Theodore Bartholomew was a librarian at Cambridge University for over 25 years. The classicist A. F. Scholfield was Librarian from 1923 to 1949. More recent University Librarians have included Eric Bertrand Ceadel, F. W. Ratcliffe (1980–94), Peter Fox (1994–2009) and Anne Jarvis (2009–16). Other notable members of staff include the bibliographer Henry Bradshaw and the Uranian poet Charles Edward Sayle, author of a history of the library.

The current librarian is Jessica Gardner. She joined the library in April 2017, becoming the 36th University Librarian.

== Exhibitions ==
The main University Library hosts exhibitions in its purpose-built Milstein Exhibition Centre. These change approximately every six to eight months and are open to all. Recent exhibitions have highlighted Cambridge's significant collection of documents from the Cairo Genizah, the landscape and geology of the English Fenlands, and the architectural history of the Cambridge University. The exhibitions are sponsored by the Cambridge University Library and are organised by the team of librarians and leading academics in the field. Entry to the exhibitions is always free and open to the general public.

== Special collections ==
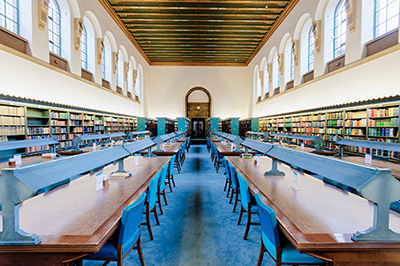
Interior of the main reading room

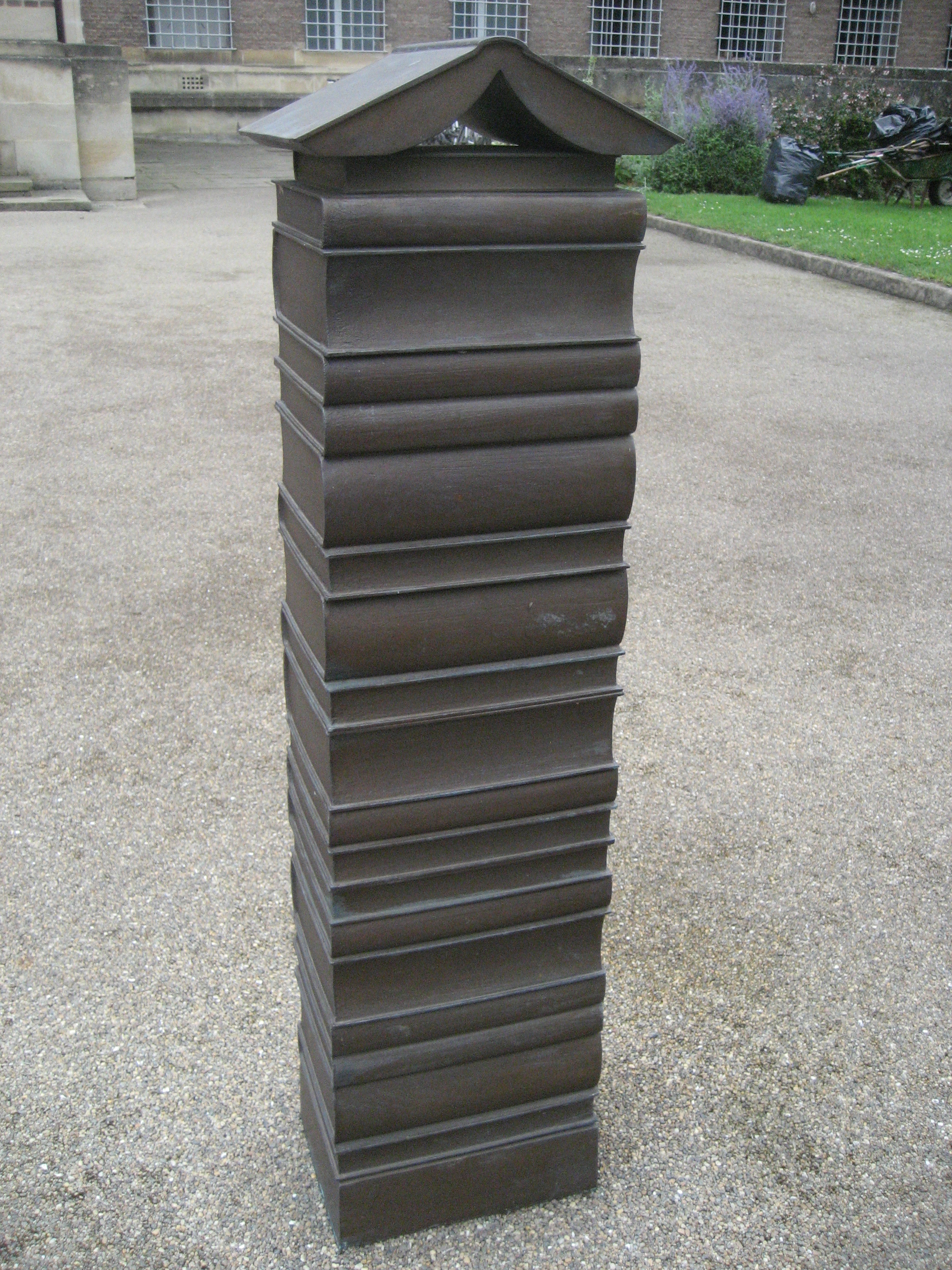
Bronze book bollard by Harry Gray in front of Library

As part of its collection of more than 8,000,000 volumes, the library contains a wealth of printed and manuscript material from earlier times. This includes:

- A copy of the Gutenberg Bible from 1455, the earliest European example of a book produced using movable type.
- Library of Lord Acton, Catholic historian and Regius Professor of Modern History in 1885–1902. The extensive library (around 60 000 volumes) collected by Lord Acton for research was bequeathed to the University Library on his death. The collection contains books from the 15th to 19th centuries, with emphasis on European history and church history. Many of the books contain annotations in Lord Acton's own hand.
- An archive of Charles Darwin's correspondence and books from his working library (including copies of his own works). In November 2020, the library announced that two of Darwin's notebooks had been lost, probably stolen, around December 2000. They were returned anonymously in 2022.
- The Hanson collection, containing important books on navigation and shipbuilding, as well as maritime atlases, some dating from the 16th century.
- The Bradshaw collection, containing more than 14 000 books relating to Ireland, printed in Ireland, or written by Irish authors. This is one of the most important collections of its kind in the world. The collection was formed by Henry Bradshaw, d. 1886. At present, the emphasis is on books printed in Ireland before 1850.
- The library of the typographer Stanley Morison, who had close links with Cambridge University Press.
- The papers of typographers and book designers Beatrice Warde (Paul Beaujon), Francis Meynell and John Dreyfus as well as bibliographers A. N. L. Munby, F. J. Norton, and Philip Gaskell, and the corporate papers of the Curwen Press, Nonesuch Press, Rampant Lions Press and Cambridge University Press.
- "The Royal Library", an important collection of more than 30 000 books assembled by John Moore (1646–1714), Bishop of Ely. The collection was bequeathed to the University Library by George I in 1715, hence the name.
- The library of the Royal Commonwealth Society, containing books, periodicals, pamphlets, photographs and manuscripts relating to the British Empire and the Commonwealth.
- South Asian, Southeast Asian and Tibetan collections.
- The Bible Society library and the library of the Society for Promoting Christian Knowledge (SPCK).
- The Taylor-Schechter Genizah Collection, a store of 140 000 manuscripts and manuscript fragments, mainly in Hebrew and Arabic, from the Ben Ezra synagogue in Cairo.
- Codex Bezae Cantabrigiensis, an important codex of the New Testament dating from the 5th century, written both in Greek and Latin. The Greek text is unique, with many interpolations found nowhere else. It was given to the University of Cambridge by the Protestant scholar Theodore Beza, friend and successor of Calvin; hence the name.
- Codex Zacynthius, a Greek New Testament codex dated paleographically to the 6th century CE.
- The Cambridge Songs (Carmina Cantabrigiensia), a collection of Goliardic medieval Latin poems, preserved on ten leaves of the Codex Cantabrigiensis.
- E.G. Browne's collection of around 480 codices in Arabic, Persian and Turkish.
- Several composer archives: William Alwyn, Arthur Bliss, Roberto Gerhard, Peter Tranchell.
- Papers of Isaac Newton, Lord Kelvin, Ernest Rutherford, George Gabriel Stokes, Joseph Needham, G. E. Moore and Siegfried Sassoon, among others.
- Archives of the Royal Observatory, Greenwich.
- Material and archives of the University of Cambridge, from probates and graces to records of various student societies.
- Around 1.5 million maps.

== Cultural references ==
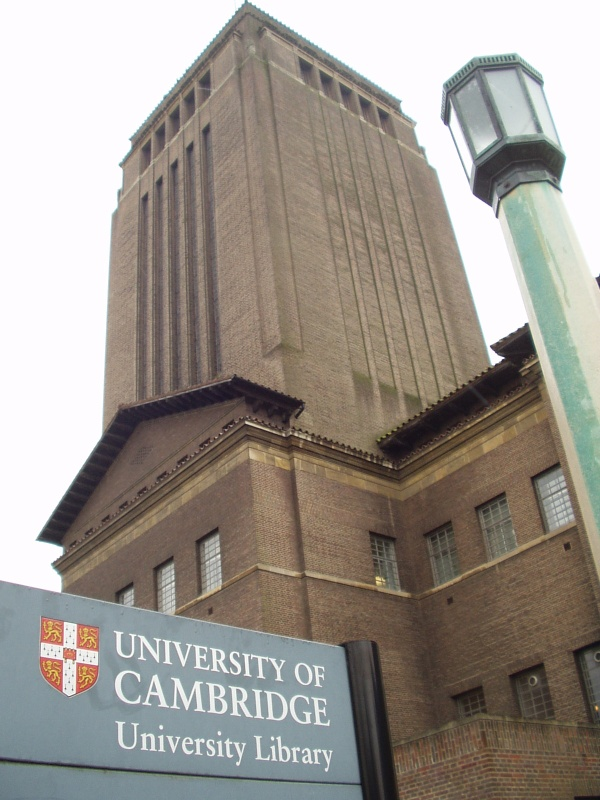
Cambridge University Library

- The Cambridge University Library has featured in several films and television programmes, including the Theory of Everything, The Chronicles of Narnia: The Voyage of the Dawn Treader, Sherlock Holmes: A Game of Shadows, Cloud Atlas, A Discovery of Witches, The Man Who Knew Infinity, and Ludwig.
- The tower of the Library has featured in a number of news programmes and documentaries for reportedly containing Victorian pornography, though this has been disproved.
- In the unfinished novel The Dark Tower, attributed to C. S. Lewis, the eponymous tower is a replica of this building.

== See also ==
- Libraries of the University of Cambridge
- List of University Librarians at the University of Cambridge
- Tobias Rustat
- Some manuscripts:
  - Book of Deer
  - Cambridge University Library, Ff. i.27
  - Moore Bede
  - Papyrus Oxyrhynchus 76
- Listed buildings in Cambridge (west)

== Bibliography ==
- Alston, R. C. (winter 1989) "Cambridge University Library", in: Research Libraries in OCLC; no. 89, pp. 2–8
- Bradshaw, Henry (1889) Collected Papers. Cambridge: Cambridge University Press Textus
- Fox, Peter (ed.) (1998) Cambridge University Library: the Great Collections. Cambridge University Press ISBN 0-521-62636-6 (Paperback ISBN 0-521-62647-1).
- Oates, J. C. T., & McKitterick, D. (1986) Cambridge University Library: a History 2 vols.
  - Oates, J. C. T. Cambridge University Library: a History; [Vol. 1]: From the beginnings to the Copyright Act of Queen Anne. Cambridge: University Press ISBN 0-521-30656-6
  - McKitterick, David Cambridge University Library: a History; [Vol. 2]: the eighteenth and nineteenth centuries. Cambridge: University Press ISBN 0-521-30655-8
- Ratcliffe, F. W. (2007) Books, Books, Just Miles and Miles of Books: across the library counter, 1950–2000. Cambridge: F. W. Ratcliffe (autobiography)
- Sayle, Charles (1916) Annals of Cambridge University Library 1278–1900. Cambridge: University Library

=== Descriptions of collections ===
- Oates, J. C. T. (1954) A Catalogue of the Fifteenth-Century Printed Books in the University Library, Cambridge. Reissued: Cambridge: Cambridge University Press ISBN 978-1-108-00848-8 Extracts
- Reif, Stefan C. (1997) Hebrew Manuscripts at Cambridge University Library: a description and introduction. Cambridge: Cambridge University Press ISBN 978-0-521-58339-8 Extracts
- Wade, Thomas Francis; Cambridge University Library (1898). A catalog of the Wade collection of Chinese and Manchu books in the library of the University of Cambridge. Compiled by Herbert Allen Giles. University Press.
- Cambridge University Library (1898). A Catalogue of the Collection of Chinese and Manchu Books Given to the University of Cambridge. The University Press.
