= A. F. Scholfield =

Alwyn Faber Scholfield (1884–1969) was a British classical scholar and librarian of the University of Cambridge 1923–49.

== Early life ==
Scholfield was born in 1884, and educated at Eton College and then King's College, Cambridge, where he took a second in both parts of the Classical Tripos. After graduating, he travelled and taught for a year at Eton.

== Career ==
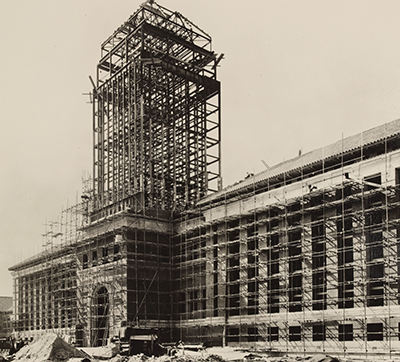
Development of Cambridge University Library in the 1930s

Scholfield worked in Cambridge University Library on classical and early printed books in 1911–12. In 1913 he went to Calcutta as keeper of the records of the Government of India and officiating librarian of the Imperial Library, Calcutta. From 1919 to 1923 he was librarian at Trinity College, Cambridge. He was elected librarian of the University of Cambridge in 1923, and held that post until 1949. During his tenure he supervised the removal of the library from Old Schools to its current site and managed it on restricted resources during the Second World War.

He translated and edited Claudius Aelianus's De natura animalium in three volumes (1958–1959) for the Loeb Classical Library and also Nicander's poems and poetical fragments with A. S. F. Gow (1953) for Cambridge University Press.

Academic offices
Preceded by Francis Jenkinson	University Librarian (Cambridge); 1923–1949	Succeeded by Harry Creswick
