= Trinity Street =

Trinity Street may be:

- Trinity Street, Cambridge, England
- Trinity Street, Southwark, London, England

== See also ==
- Trinity Lane, Cambridge, England
