= Oxford Gazette =

The Oxford Gazette may refer to:

- The Oxford University Gazette, the publication of record for the University of Oxford
- The Oxford Gazette, former name of The London Gazette
- Oxford Gazette, former name of Reading Mercury
