= Praelector =

A praelector is a traditional role at the University of Cambridge and the University of Oxford. The role differs somewhat between the two universities.

== University of Cambridge ==
At Cambridge, a praelector is the fellow of a college who formally presents students during their matriculation and the graduation ceremony at Cambridge, especially during the Congregation of the Regent House when degrees are conferred.

== University of Oxford ==
At Oxford, a praelector may be a fellow of the college, but may also be a college tutor who is responsible for running an honours school in the absence of a fellow. A praelector may also hold a college fellowship.
