= Claudius Aelianus =

Roman author and teacher (c. 175 – c. 235)

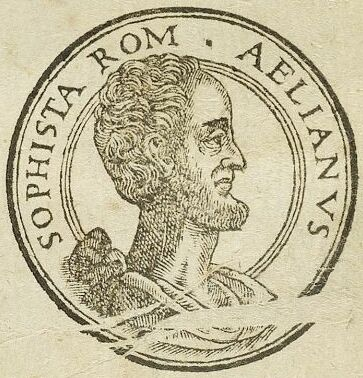
- Imaginary portrait of Aelian from a 1610 edition of the Varia Historia
- Born: c. 175; Praeneste
- Died: c. 235
- Other name: Aelian
- Occupations: Author and teacher of rhetoric
- Era: Severan dynasty
- Known for: Author of De Natura Animalium and Varia Historia
- Notable work: De Natura Animalium; Varia Historia
- Style: Archaizing form of the Ancient Greek language

Claudius Aelianus (Ancient Greek: Κλαύδιος Αἰλιανός, romanized: Klaúdios Ailianós; c. 175 – c. 235 AD), commonly Aelian (/ˈiːliən/), born at Praeneste, was a Roman author and teacher of rhetoric who flourished under Septimius Severus and probably outlived Elagabalus, who died in 222. He spoke Greek so fluently that he was called "honey-tongued" (μελίγλωσσος meliglossos); Roman-born, he preferred Greek authors, and wrote in a slightly archaizing Greek himself.

His two chief works are valuable for the numerous quotations from the works of earlier authors, which are otherwise lost, and for the surprising lore, which offers unexpected glimpses into the Greco-Roman world-view. His De Natura Animalium is also the only surviving Greco-Roman work to name Gilgamesh.

== De Natura Animalium ==
On the Nature of Animals (alternatively "On the Characteristics of Animals"; Ancient Greek: Περὶ ζῴων ἰδιότητος, Perì zṓōn idiótētos; usually cited by its Latin title De Natura Animalium) is a collection, in seventeen books, of brief stories of natural history. Some are included for the moral lessons they convey; others because they are astonishing.

The introduction to the Loeb Classical Library translation by A.F. Schofield characterizes the book as "miscellany of facts: genuine or supposed, gleaned by Aelian from earlier and contemporary Greek writers (no Latin writer is once named) and to a limited extent from his own observation to illustrate the habits of the animal world," which, based on Stoicism, is designed "to entertain and while so doing to convey instruction in the most agreeable form".

Aelian's anecdotes on animals rarely depend on direct observation: they are almost entirely taken from written sources, not only Pliny the Elder, Theopompus, and Lycus of Rhegium, but also other authors and works now lost, to whom he is thus a valuable witness. He is more attentive to marine life than might be expected, though, and this seems to reflect first-hand personal interest; he often quotes "fishermen". At times he strikes the modern reader as thoroughly credulous, but at others he specifically states that he is merely reporting what is told by others, and even that he does not believe them. Aelian's work is one of the sources of medieval natural history and of the bestiaries of the Middle Ages.

Conrad Gessner (or Gesner), the Swiss scientist and natural historian of the Renaissance, made a Latin translation of Aelian's work, giving it a wider European audience. An English translation by A. F. Scholfield was published in 1958–59 in the Loeb Classical Library in three volumes. D.E. Eichholz observed that "Aelian's text, riddled as it is with corrupt passages and packed with interpretations, provides ample scope for reckless emendation", praising Scholfield for restraint in this direction.

== Varia Historia ==
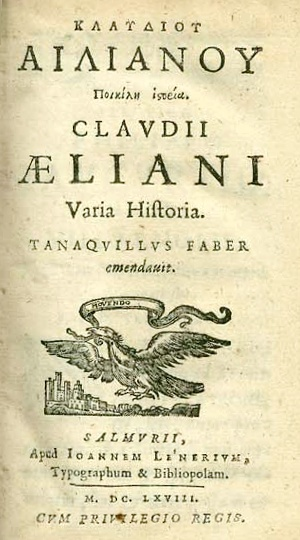
Title page of Varia Historia, from the 1668 edition by Tanaquil Faber

Various History (Ποικίλη ἱστορία, Poikílē historía)—for the most part preserved only in an abridged form—is Aelian's other well-known work, a miscellany of anecdotes and biographical sketches, lists, pithy maxims, and descriptions of natural wonders and strange local customs, in 14 books, with many surprises for the cultural historian and the mythographer, anecdotes about the famous Greek philosophers, poets, historians, and playwrights and myths instructively retold. The emphasis is on various moralizing tales about heroes and rulers, athletes and wise men; reports about food and drink, different styles in dress or lovers, local habits in giving gifts or entertainments, or in religious beliefs and death customs; and comments on Greek painting. Aelian gives accounts of, among other things, fly fishing using lures of red wool and feathers, lacquerwork, and serpent worship. Essentially, the Various History is a classical "magazine" in the original sense of that word. He is not perfectly trustworthy in details, and his writing was heavily influenced by Stoic opinions, perhaps so that his readers will not feel guilty, but Jane Ellen Harrison found survivals of archaic rites mentioned by Aelian very illuminating in her Prolegomena to the Study of Greek Religion (1903, 1922).

Varia Historia was first printed in 1545. The standard modern text is that of Mervin R. Dilts (1974).

Two English translations of the Various History, by Fleming (1576) and Stanley (1665) made Aelian's miscellany available to English readers, but after 1665 no English translation appeared, until three English translations appeared almost simultaneously: James G. DeVoto, Claudius Aelianus: Ποικίλης Ἱστορίας (Varia Historia) Chicago, 1995; Diane Ostrom Johnson, An English Translation of Claudius Aelianus' "Varia Historia", 1997; and N. G. Wilson, Aelian: Historical Miscellany in the Loeb Classical Library.

== Other works ==
Considerable fragments of two other works, On Providence and Divine Manifestations, are preserved in the early medieval encyclopedia, the Suda. Twenty "letters from a farmer" after the manner of Alciphron are also attributed to him. The letters are invented compositions to a fictitious correspondent, which are a device for vignettes of agricultural and rural life, set in Attica, though Aelian once boasted that he had never been outside Italy, never been aboard a ship (which is at variance, though, with his own statement, de Natura Animalium XI.40, that he had seen the bull Serapis with his own eyes). Thus conclusions about actual agriculture in the Letters are as likely to evoke Latium as Attica. The fragments have been edited in 1998 by D. Domingo-Foraste, whose edition has been sharply criticized. The Letters are available in the Loeb Classical Library, translated by Allen Rogers Benner and Francis H. Fobes (1949).

== Translations ==
- Aelian, On Animals. 3 volumes. Translated by A. F. Scholfield. 1958–9. Loeb Classical Library. ISBN 978-0-674-99491-1, ISBN 978-0-674-99493-5, and ISBN 978-0-674-99494-2
- Aelian, Historical Miscellany. Translated by Nigel G. Wilson. 1997. Loeb Classical Library. ISBN 978-0-674-99535-2
- Alciphron, Aelian, and Philostratus, The Letters. Translated by A. R. Benner, F. H. Fobes. 1949. Loeb Classical Library. ISBN 978-0-674-99421-8
- Aelian, On the Nature of Animals. Translated by Gregory McNamee. 2011. Trinity University Press. ISBN 978-1-59534-075-7
- Ailianos, Vermischte Forschung. Greek and German by Kai Brodersen. 2018. Sammlung Tusculum. De Gruyter Berlin & Boston ISBN 978-3-11-057638-2
- Ailianos, Tierleben. Greek and German by Kai Brodersen. 2018. Sammlung Tusculum. De Gruyter Berlin & Boston 2018, ISBN 978-3-11-060932-5
- Claudius Aelianus, Vom Wesen der Tiere – De natura animalium. German and Commentary by Paul-Gerhard Veh, Philipp Stahlhut. 2020. Bibliothek der Griechischen Literaur. Anton Hiersemann Verlag Stuttgart 2020, ISBN ISBN 978-3-7772-1904-2

== See also ==
- Historiae animalium by Gessner
