= Old Schools =

Section of the University of Cambridge

Coordinates: 52.2053°N 0.1166°E

Old Schools (Cambridge)
- View from Great St Mary's tower, with the 1750s east range of Cobble Court and the 1440s gatehouse of West Court behind

General information
- Location: Cambridge, England
- Year built: 1400–1890
- Owner: University of Cambridge

Listed Building – Grade I
- Reference no.: 1126279

The Old Schools is a complex of buildings in central Cambridge, England, which is owned by the University of Cambridge and houses the university offices.

The eastern part, Cobble Court, was built in the 14th and 15th centuries to house the earliest schools of the university and later the university library, while the West Court was originally constructed in 1441 as the Old Court of King's College. The college moved out in 1829 and the university library came to occupy the entire site, before it moved to a new building in the 1930s and the site became university offices.

The building is Grade I listed, with a separate Grade I listing for the Cockerell Building on the northern edge of the site. It is located at the end of Trinity Lane, surrounded by other historic university and college buildings - the Senate House, King's College Chapel, Clare College, Trinity Hall and Gonville and Caius College. The Old Schools Site covers the Old Schools, the Senate House, and Great St Mary's, the University Church.

== History ==
The west (1430–57) and north (1400) ranges of the schools quadrangle, from Cobble Court

The University of Cambridge had acquired land to the west of Great St Mary's Church before 1278, and began construction of its schools quadrangle on the site at the end of the 14th century. The first part to be built was the north range, containing the divinity school and Regent House, which was completed in 1400. From the 1420s they were joined by university library, then merely a few chests of books, and the west range with a library above a canon law school was completed by 1438. The southern side was added between 1458 and 1471, with a library – which replaced that in the west range – above a civil law school. The quadrangle was completed in 1473 with a building on the eastern side, with a second library above rooms used as courts and for official purposes.

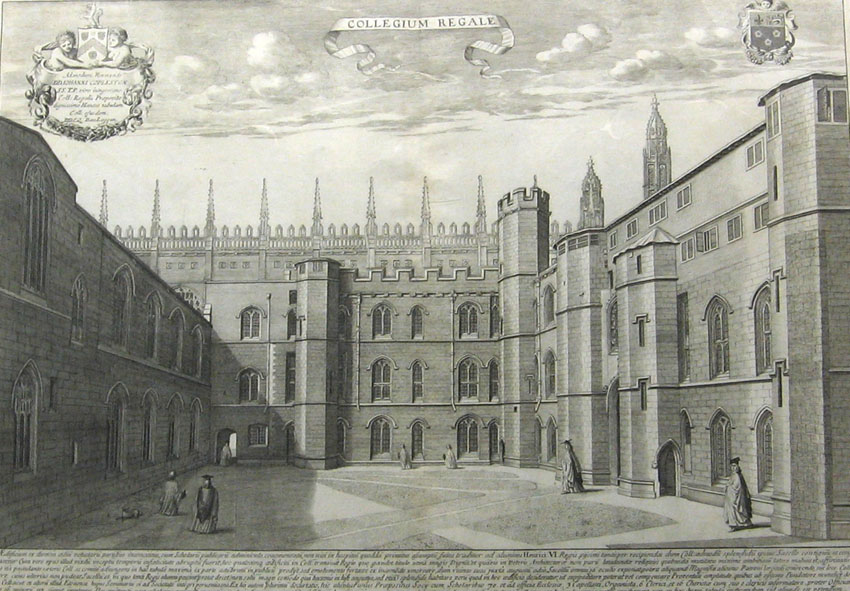
King's College Old Court in 1690 (West Court, looking south); print by David Loggan

In 1441, King Henry VI laid the first stone of King's College on a site to the west of the schools, formerly a garden of Trinity Hall. This court was designed to house the 12 scholars specified in the college's original foundation, but new statues in 1443 expanded the college to 70 fellows and scholars, and Henry began to plan for a far larger quadrangle on a site to the south. The gateway and south range of the original court had already been constructed, but the remaining buildings, including hall, were swiftly completed in a temporary fashion to serve until the new quadrangle became ready. However, due to Henry's involvement in the Wars of the Roses, funds dried up, and—other than the chapel—the new quadrangle was never completed. Old Court, reconfigured to accommodate the much larger foundation, remained the home of the college until the 19th century.

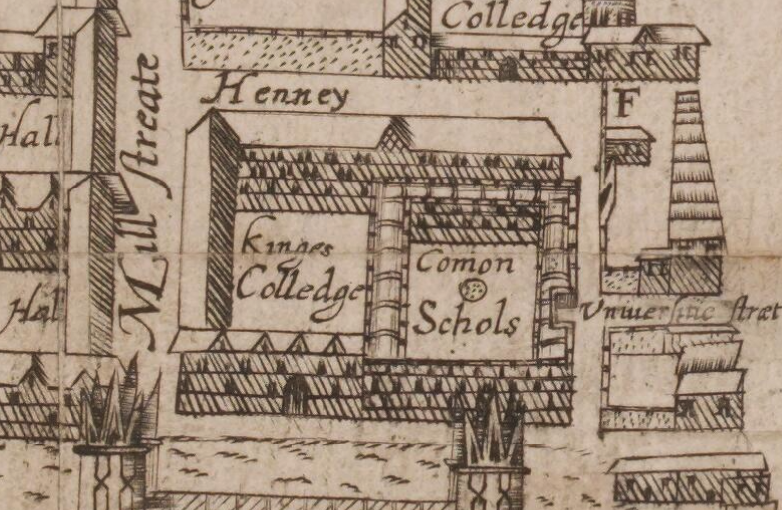
The site depicted on Richard Lyne's 1574 map of Cambridge

The first university librarian was appointed in 1577, but there were few changes to the site, until in 1715 a large gift of books owned by Bishop John Moore made the lack of space urgent. The first floor of the western range of the schools court was converted from a law school to a library, and a new building was constructed 1718–19 in the north-west angle of the King's College Old Court, including a first-floor room known as the Dome Room.

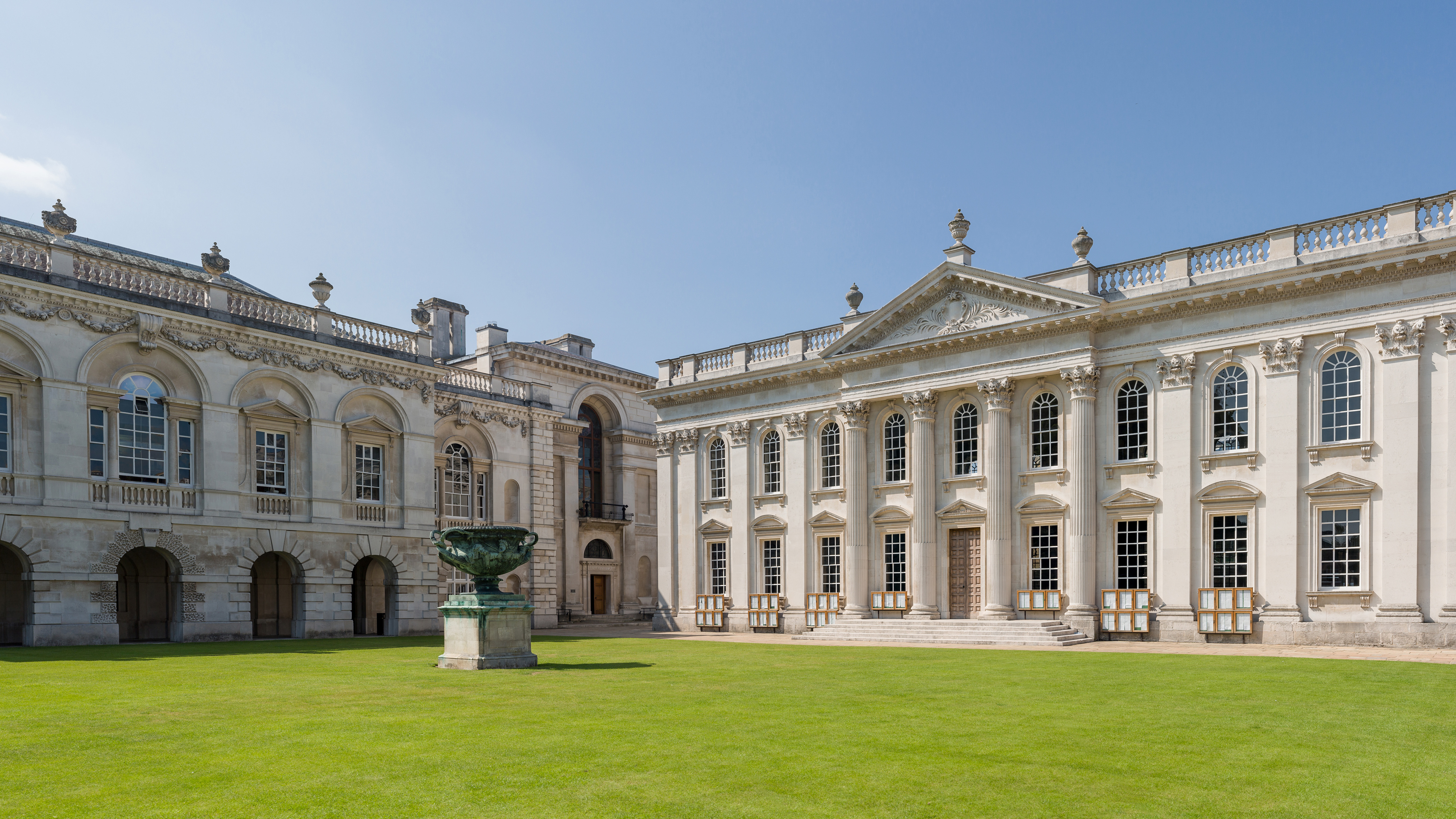
Wright's east range, 1754-8 (left) with the 1730 Senate House (right) and the end of the Cockerell Building, 1836–37 (centre)

In 1730, the new Senate House was completed to the east of the site and the library expanded into the rooms previously used for this purpose, completing its occupation of the entire first floor of the schools quadrangle. The Senate House had been intended to be one side of a new quadrangle including a new library building on the eastern side, but a lawsuit from the master of Gonville and Caius College, concerned that the development would impinge upon his buildings and obstruct access to his college, meant the development was never completed. Instead, in 1754–58, the eastern side of the schools quadrangle, adjacent to the new Senate House, was reconstructed by Stephen Wright in a classical style.

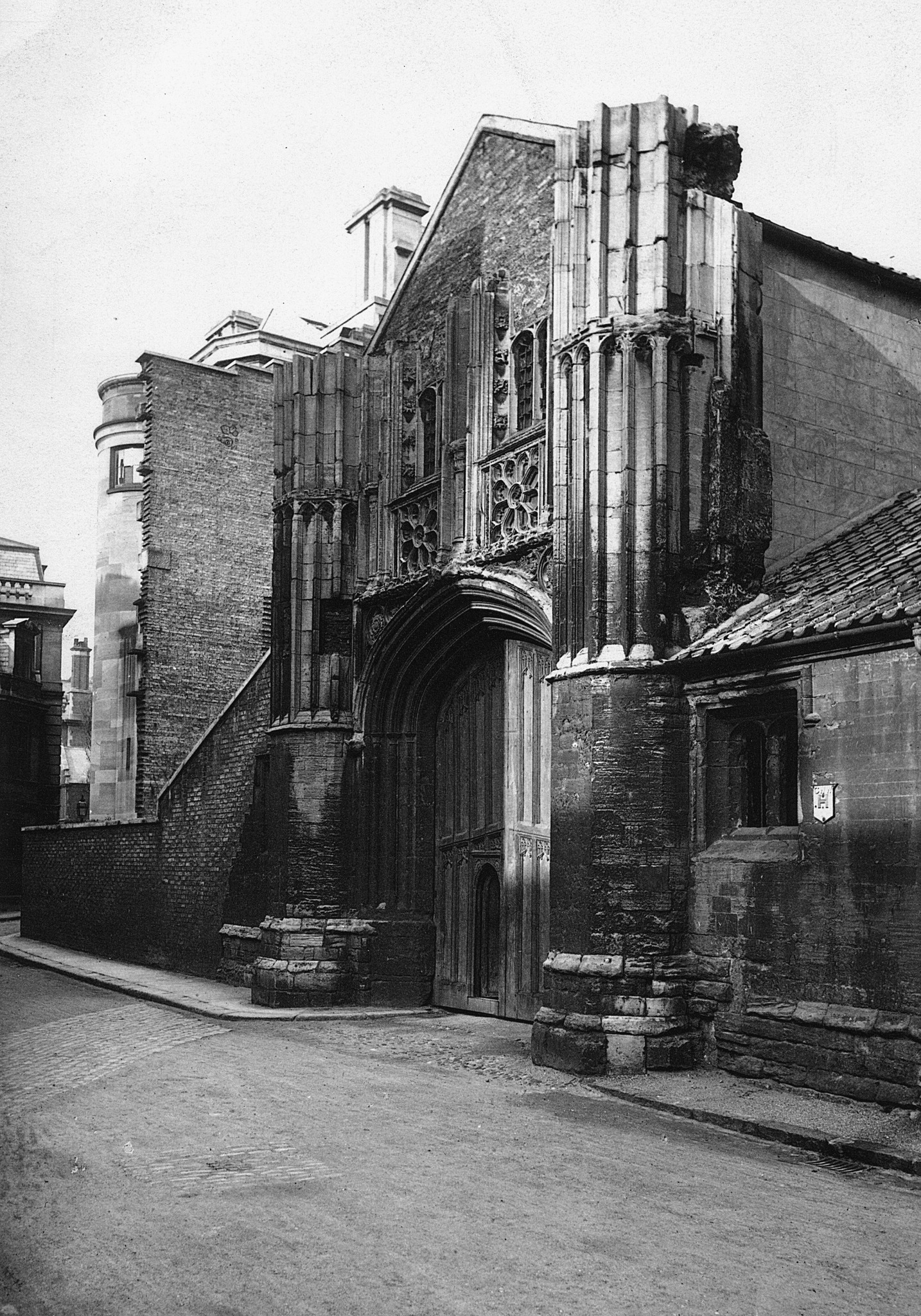
Gate and partially demolished buildings of west range before 1889 rebuilding

In 1828, William Wilkins finally completed the front court of King's College and the college's Old Court became redundant. It was sold to the university in 1829 to enable expansion of the university library, and was partly demolished in the 1830s, remaining in a ruined state for half a century. A new north wing, replacing the former hall of King's College and blocking the frontage of the 14th-century north range of the schools quadrangle, was designed by Charles Robert Cockerell and built 1836–37 in a grand classical style. This was intended to be the first part of a scheme to rebuild the entire complex in the same style. However, this scheme was never completed and – although the old divinity school was handed over to the library in 1856 – by the 1860s the lack of space for books was again becoming acute.

In 1864 Sir George Gilbert Scott produced plans for an extension on the site of the Old Court, and the southern range was completed in 1867, including a third storey over the 14th-century south range of the schools quadrangle. By 1878, space issues had again become pressing, and various options were considered including roofing over one or both quadrangles with glass to create a reading room. Instead, John Loughborough Pearson was engaged to design a building on the western side of the site, connecting the Scott and Cockerell buildings and incorporating the former King's College gatehouse. This was completed by 1890. The library continued to expand in the site, until by 1903, after the departure of the Sedgwick Museum of Earth Sciences to its new building, the library occupied the whole of both quadrangles.

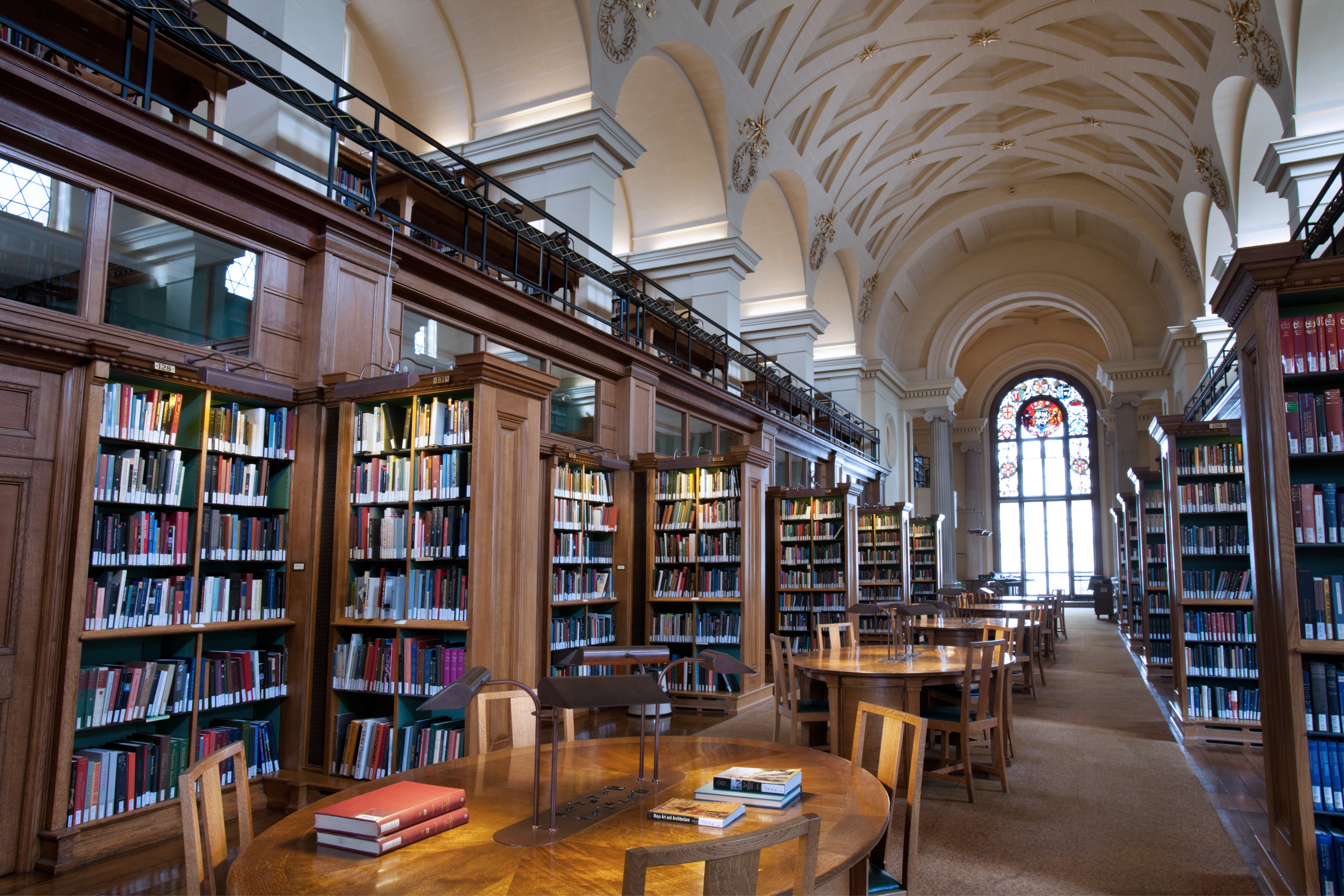
Interior of the Cockerell Building in use as Gonville and Caius College library

By 1918, the problem of space was again urgent and various options were considered for the Old Schools site, including underground bookstores below the quadrangles, as well as both the 19th-century plan to glaze over one of the quadrangles, and the 18th-century plan for a new building opposite the Senate House. Instead, the decision was made to construct an entirely new library to the west of Cambridge, and the 1,142,000 books of the library were moved to it in 1934, vacating the Old Schools site. Architect Murray Easton converted the buildings into university offices, a law school, ceremonial rooms and the libraries of the law, history, modern languages, moral sciences and English departments, with the work largely complete by 1935.

In 1968, the Seeley Historical Library, which had been accommodated in the Cockerell Building, moved to a new site, and in 1995 the Squire Law Library followed suit, vacating the building. The lease was acquired by Gonville and Caius College, and the Cockerell Building opened as the college library in 1997.

== Buildings ==
=== Cobble Court ===
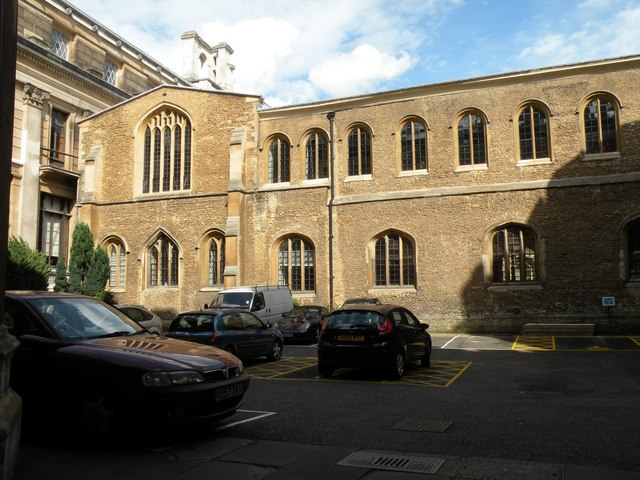
The west range of Cobble Court, 1430-57, viewed from West Court

Cobble Court was originally built as the university schools. The north range was constructed in the late 14th century, from rubble with freestone dressings. Its first floor contains the former Regent House, with a c. 1600 plaster ceiling on the original c. 1400 roof. Its north face is blocked by the Cockerell Building.

The east range was built 1754–58 by Stephen Wright, with an open loggia on the ground floor. The original staircase survives, along with wood and plaster decoration in the main upper room. This building replaced an original range of 1473, containing a library above rooms used for official purposes.

The south range was constructed in two stories 1457–70, with a third storey added in 1856–57 by George Gilbert Scott, who also added buttresses and refaced the south front with ashlar, creating a visually unified south front with his rebuilt south range of West Court. Inside, the first floor contains the Council Room with a 1466 roof, a carved ceiling and 18th-century doorways; seven 15th-century windows also survive on the first floor. The west range, dividing Cobble Court from West Court, was built 1435–55, but significantly altered in the 18th century; two 15th-century windows survive.

=== West Court ===
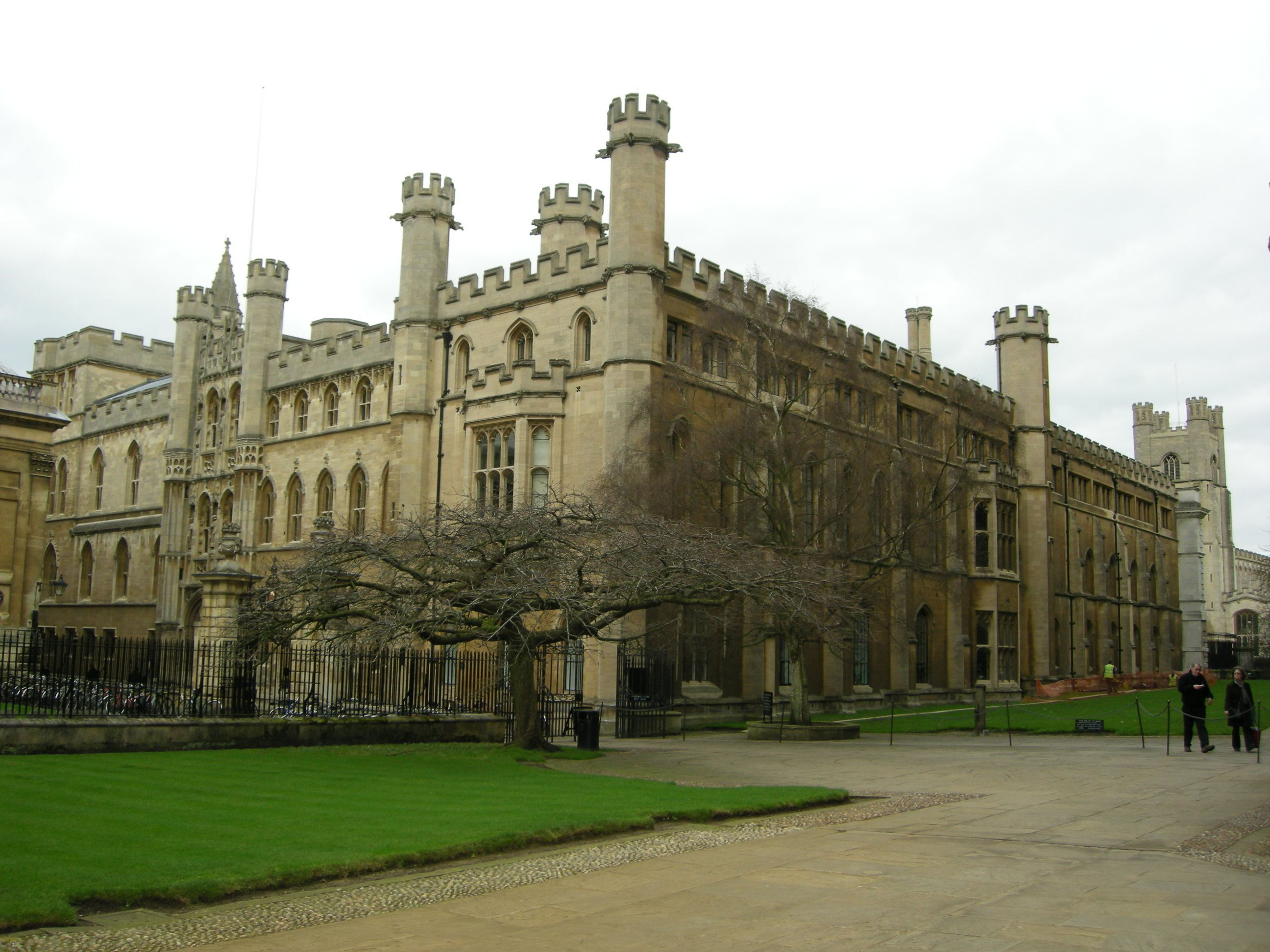
The site from the south-west, showing the south and west ranges rebuilt by Scott and Pearson

West Court was the Old Court of King's College until 1829, when it was sold to the university and partly demolished. The north range is the Cockerell Building, constructed in 1837–40 by Charles Robert Cockerell on the site of the former hall of King's College, as part of a plan to reconstruct the entire complex in a similar style. It extends over the north front of Cobble Court, and now serves as the library of Gonville and Caius College.

The court has no east range, as its eastern side is occupied by the west range of Cobble Court, which the college was not allowed to build against. The south range was originally constructed in 1441–44 for King's College, but was partially demolished in 1829 and rebuilt in 1864–67 by George Gilbert Scott.

The west range contains the original 15th-century gate of King's College. The remainder of the range was largely demolished around 1829, and reconstructed in 1890 by John Loughborough Pearson, who also extensively restored the gatehouse. The north-west angle building was constructed in 1718–19, with a third storey added in modern times. The Dome Room, on the first floor, has original 18th-century panelling and plaster ceiling.

== Gallery ==
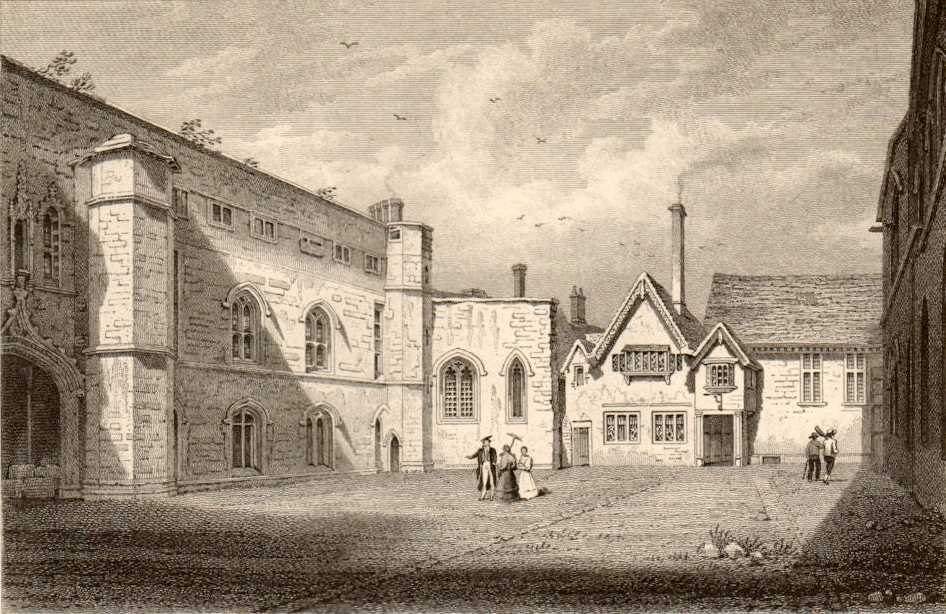
Early 19th-century view of the 15th-century temporary buildings of Old Court, before their demolition

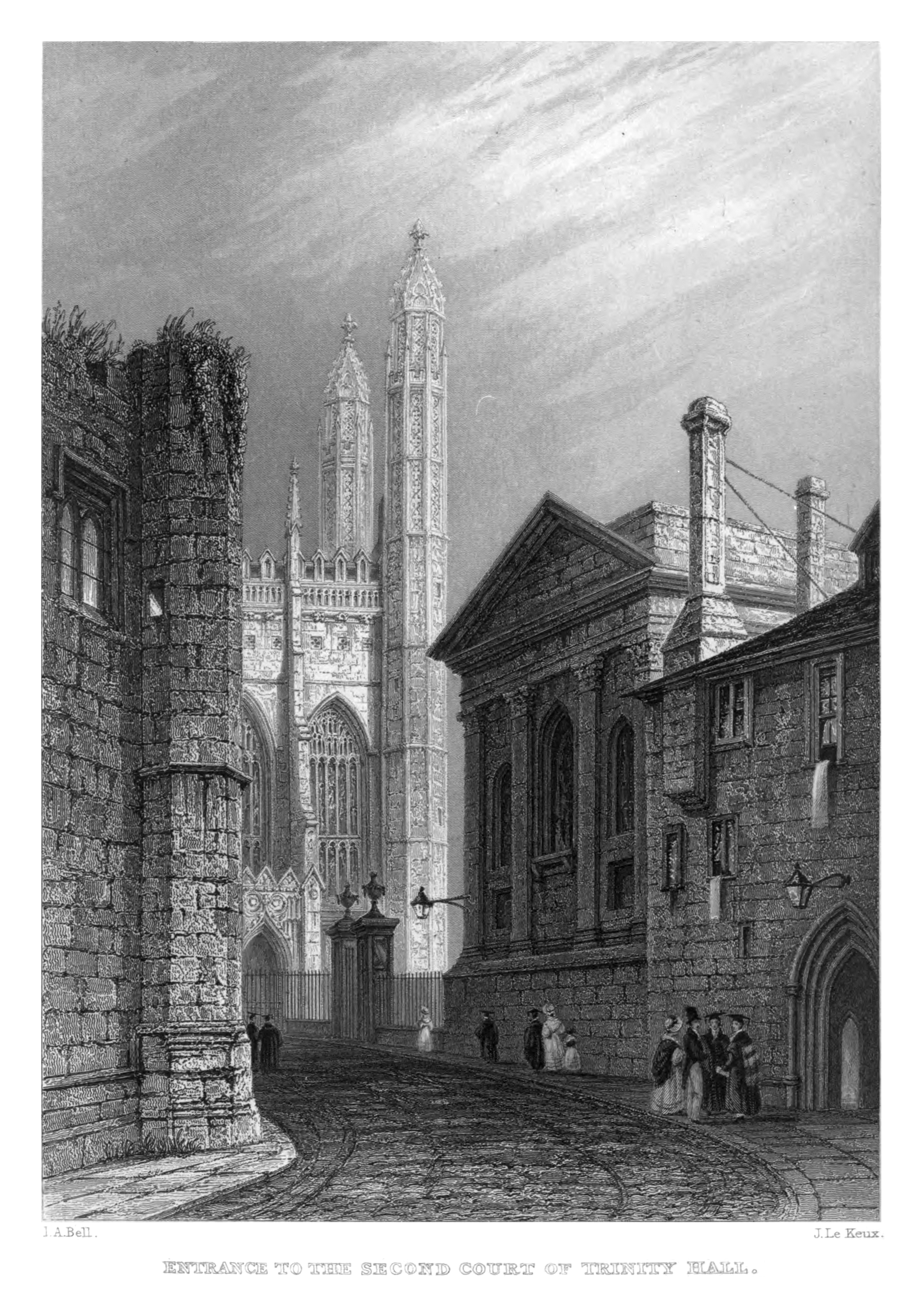
Trinity Hall Second Court entrance in 1840, with Old Court partially demolished to the left

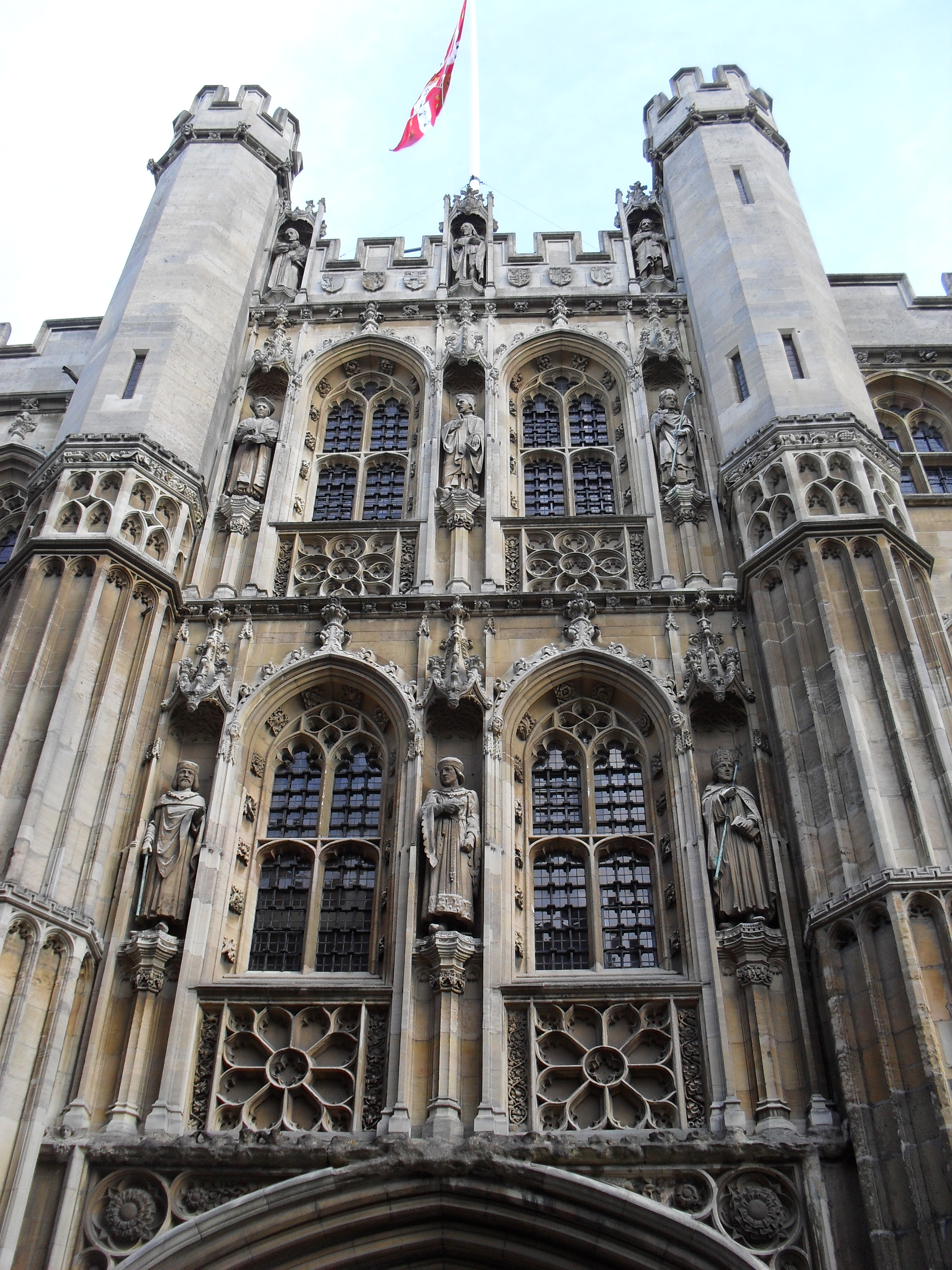
Gatehouse, as restored by John Loughborough Pearson
