= John Barnardiston =

English clergyman and librarian

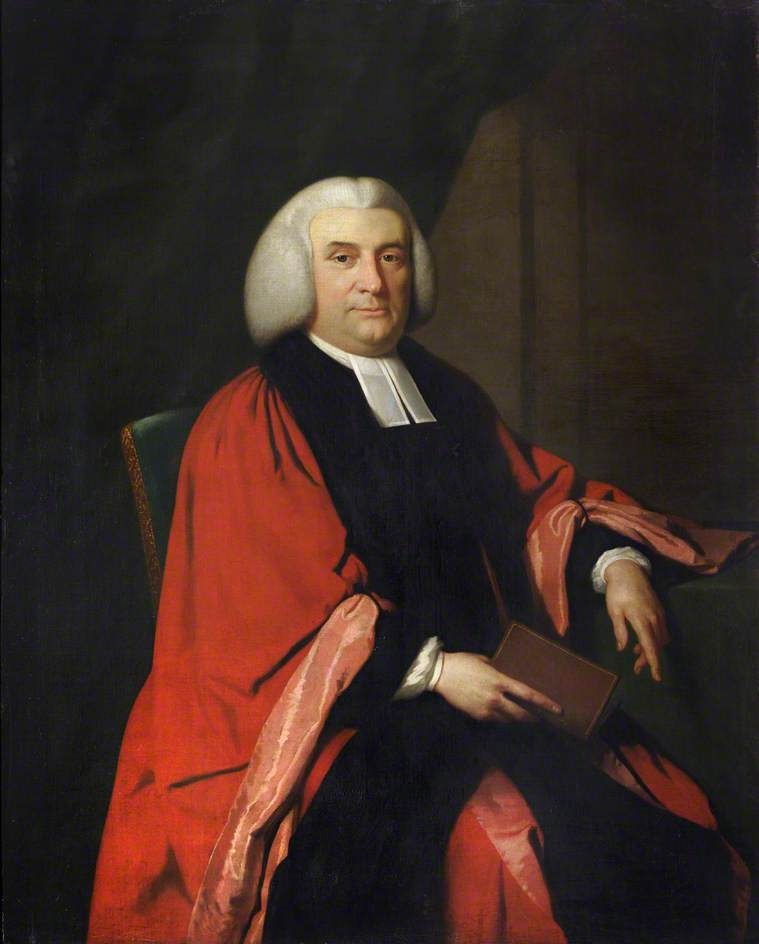
A 1750 portrait of Barnardiston by Frans van der Mijn

John Barnardiston (c. 1719 – 17 June 1778) was an English clergyman and librarian. Born in London c. 1719, he was the son of George Barnardiston, a lawyer who was a member of the Middle Temple. Growing up, Barnardiston studied at Tonbridge School, which awarded him an exhibition to study at Corpus Christi College, Cambridge as a sizar in 1737. He studied at the University of Cambridge for seven years, being awarded a Bachelor of Arts in 1741 and a Master of Arts in 1744. In the next year, Barnardiston became a fellow of Corpus Christi College and continued to hold that position until 1759.

He was ordained as the deacon of Ely, Cambridgeshire by the Church of England in 1747, and became a priest in the next year. In 1751, Barnardiston served as the reverend of Brinkley, Cambridgeshire; three years later, he was appointed the vicar of Stow cum Quy. After graduating from Cambridge, Barnardiston continued to study at the university, and was awarded a Bachelor of Divinity in 1752 and a Doctor of Divinity in 1764. He was further appointed as the vicar of St Bene't's Church, Cambridge in 1758 and the reverend of Fulmodeston and Thurning, Norfolk from 1759 to 1778.

On 17 April 1760, Barnardiston married Hester Powell. In 1764, he was appointed as the master and vice-chancellor of Corpus Christi College, holding both offices until the end of his life; five years later, Barndistan began serving as the University of Cambridge's principal librarian. On 17 June 1778, he died at Corpus Christi College.
