= Senate House, Cambridge =

Building at the University of Cambridge

Coordinates: 52.205586°N 0.117378°E

Senate House
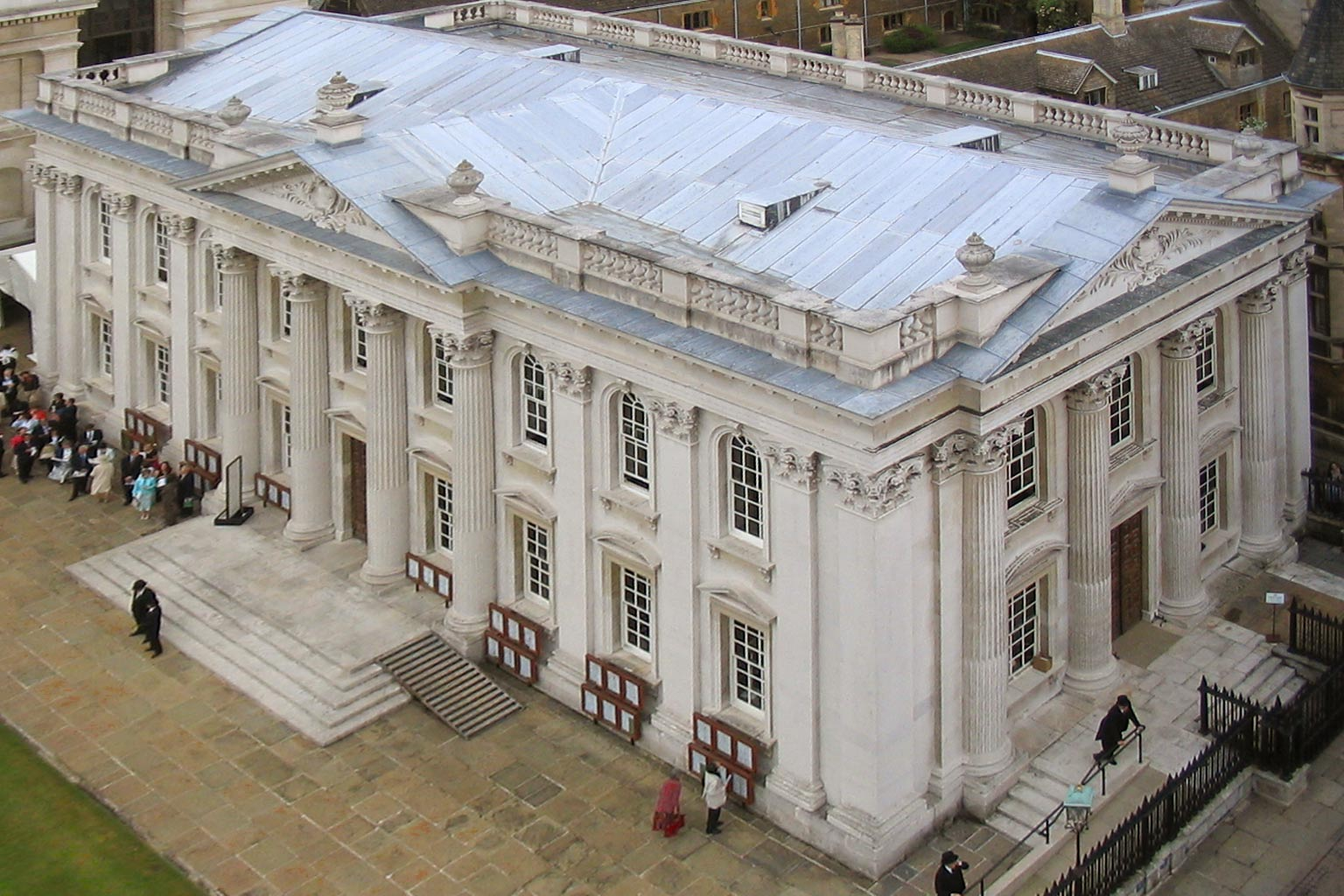
- The Senate House viewed from the Great St Mary's tower
- Interactive map of the Senate House area

General information
- Type: Academic
- Architectural style: Neoclassical
- Location: King's Parade, Cambridge
- Construction started: 1722
- Completed: 1730
- Owner: University of Cambridge

Design and construction
- Architect: James Gibbs

The Senate House is a 1720s building of the University of Cambridge in England, used formerly for meetings of its senate and now mainly for graduation ceremonies.

== Location and construction ==
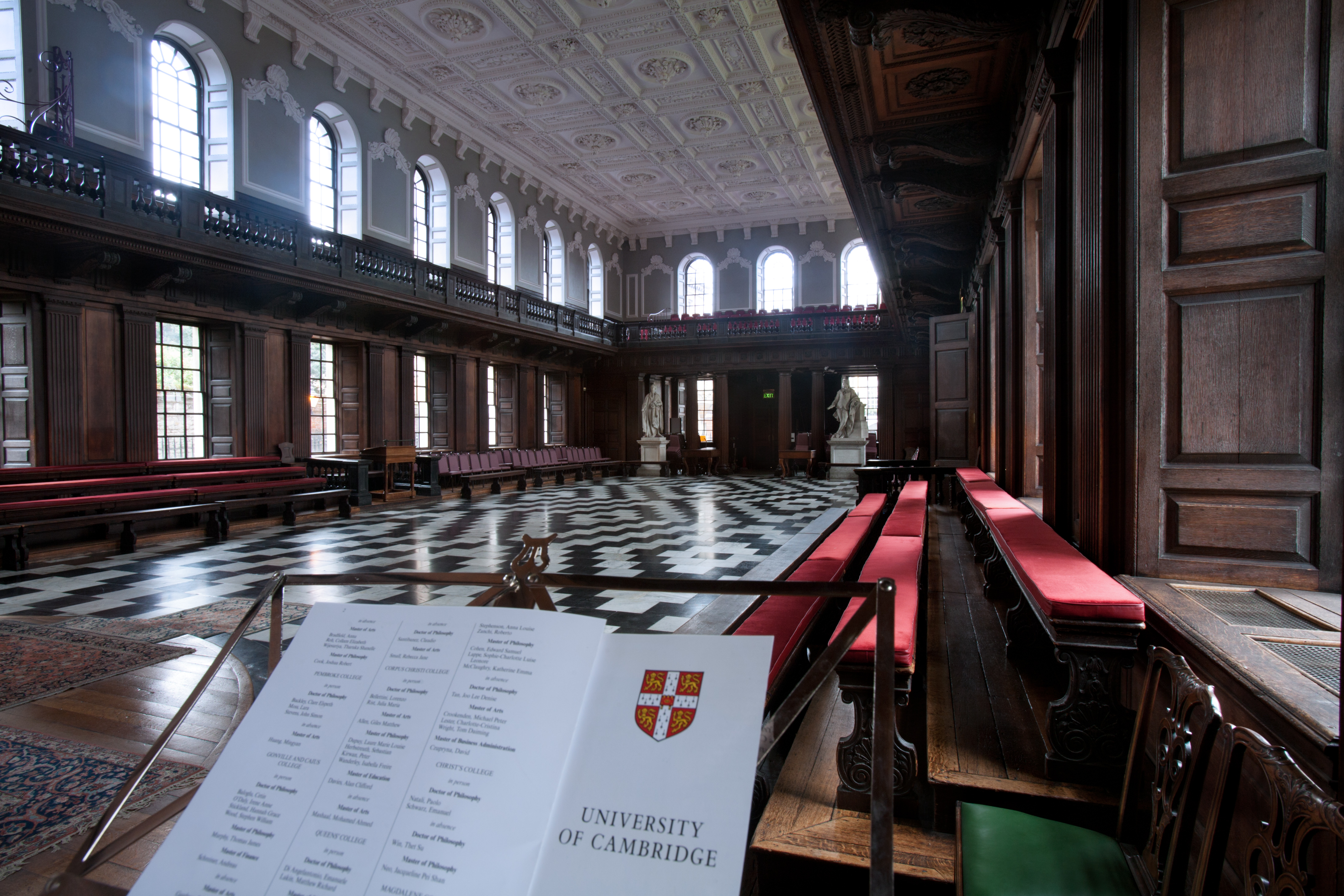
Senate House interior looking towards the east end

The building, which is situated in the centre of the city between King's and Gonville and Caius Colleges, was designed by architect James Gibbs, based to an unclear extent on designs by the gentleman-architect Sir James Burrough, and built in 1722–1730 by Gibbs in a neo-classical style using Portland stone. The ceremony to lay the first stone was performed by Thomas Crosse, then Vice-Chancellor, on 22 June 1722. The site was previously used for houses, which were purchased by an act of Parliament, dated 11 June 1720. It was officially opened in July 1730, although the western end was not completed until 1768.

The Senate House was originally intended to be one side of a quadrangle, however the rest of the structure was never completed. It forms part of the Old Schools Site. It is a Grade I listed building.

== History and usage ==
=== Graduation ceremony ===
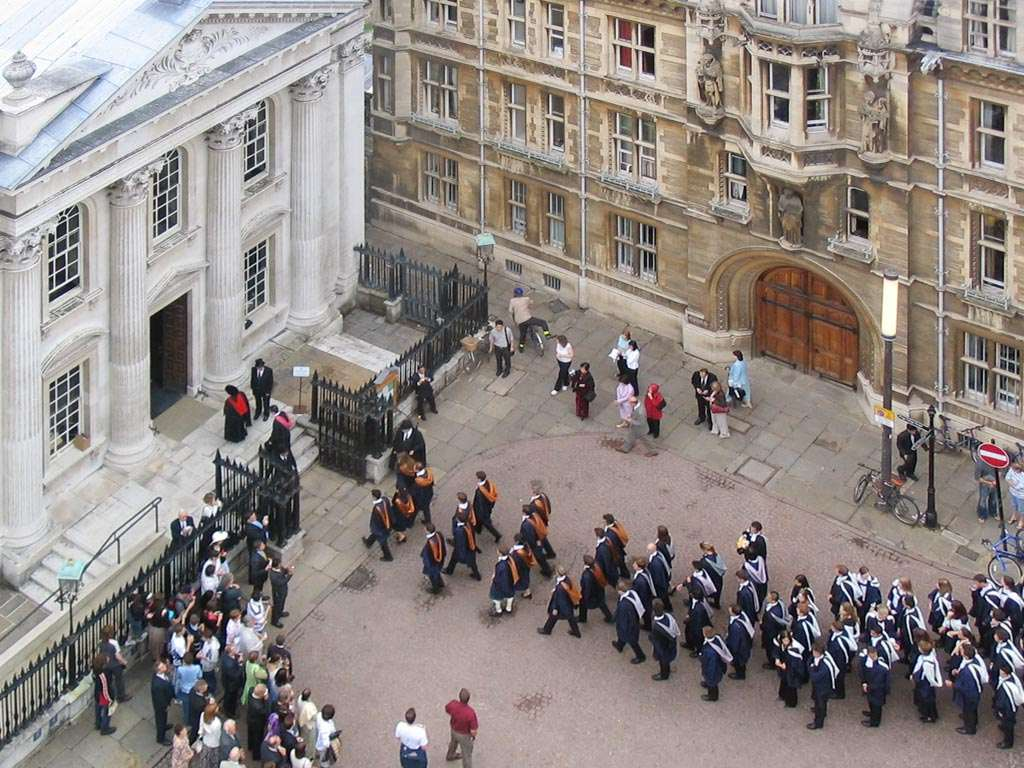
Graduands enter the Senate House at a graduation ceremony

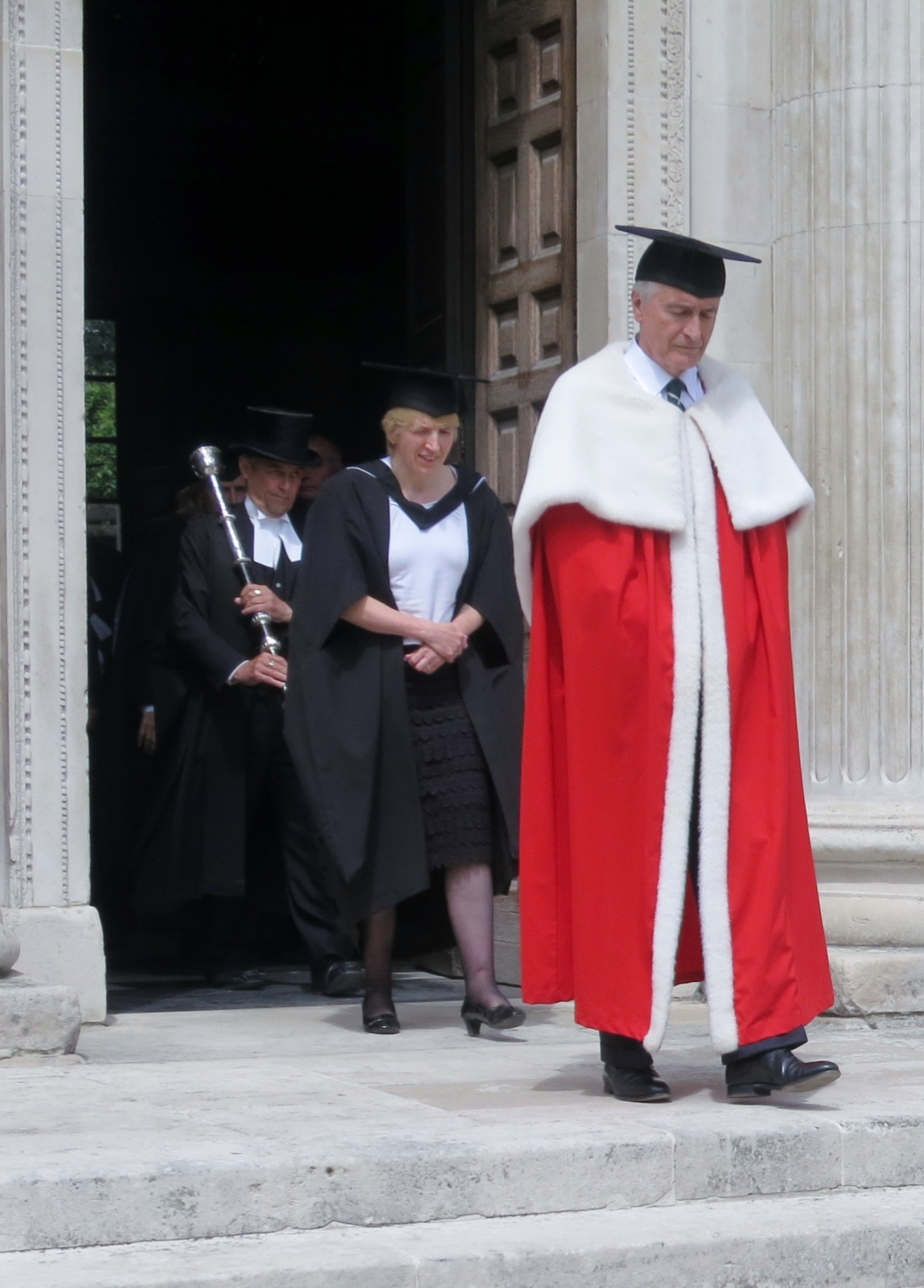
Lord Eatwell, in academic dress, leaving the Senate House

Graduates receiving an undergraduate degree wear the academic dress that they were entitled to before graduating: for example, most students becoming Bachelors of Arts wear undergraduate gowns and not BA gowns. Graduates are presented in the Senate House college by college, in order of foundation or recognition by the university, except for the royal colleges.

The 31 colleges process to the Senate House in the following order:

1. King's
2. Trinity
3. St John's
4. Peterhouse
5. Clare
6. Pembroke
7. Gonville & Caius
8. Trinity Hall
9. Corpus Christi
10. Queens'
11. St Catharine's
12. Jesus
13. Christ's
14. Magdalene
15. Emmanuel
16. Sidney Sussex
17. Downing
18. Girton
19. Newnham
20. Selwyn
21. Fitzwilliam
22. Churchill
23. Murray Edwards
24. Darwin
25. Wolfson
26. Clare Hall
27. Robinson
28. Lucy Cavendish
29. St Edmund's
30. Hughes Hall
31. Homerton

During the congregation, graduands are brought forth by the Praelector of their college, who takes them by the right hand, and presents them to the vice-chancellor for the degree they are about to take. The Praelector presents graduands with the following Latin statement, substituting the name of the degree for "____":

"Dignissima domina, Domina Procancellaria et tota Academia praesento vobis hunc virum quem scio tam moribus quam doctrina esse idoneum ad gradum assequendum _____; idque tibi fide mea praesto totique Academiae.

(Most worthy Vice-Chancellor and the whole University, I present to you this man whom I know to be suitable as much by character as by learning to proceed to the degree of ____; for which I pledge my faith to you and to the whole University.)"

and female graduands with the following:

"Dignissima domina, Domina Procancellaria et tota Academia praesento vobis hanc mulierem quam scio tam moribus quam doctrina esse idoneam ad gradum assequendum ____; idque tibi fide mea praesto totique Academiae.

(Most worthy Vice-Chancellor and the whole University, I present to you this woman whom I know to be suitable as much by character as by learning to proceed to the degree of ____; for which I pledge my faith to you and to the whole University.)"

After presentation, the graduand is called by name and kneels before the vice-chancellor and proffers their hands to the vice-chancellor, who clasps them and then confers the degree through the following Latin statement—the Trinitarian formula (in nomine Patris...) may be omitted at the request of the graduand:

"Auctoritate mihi commissa admitto te ad gradum ____, in nomine Patris et Filii et Spiritus Sancti.

(By the authority committed to me, I admit you to the degree of ____, in the name of the Father and of the Son and of the Holy Ghost.)"

The now-graduate then rises, bows and leaves the Senate House through the Doctor's door, and receives their certificate, into Senate House passage.

At the University of Cambridge, each graduation is a separate act of the university's governing body, the Regent House, and must be voted on as with any other act. A formal meeting of the Regent House, known as a Congregation, is held for this purpose.

=== University's 800th anniversary ===
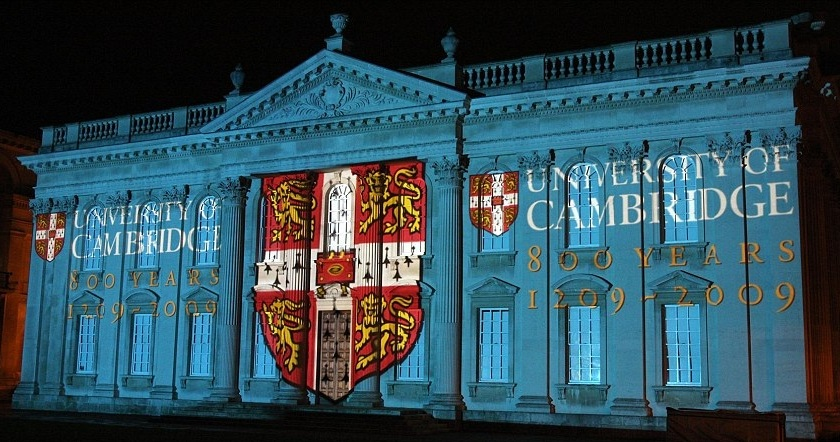
Light show on the Senate House, for the 800th anniversary of the foundation of the university

As part of the university's 800th anniversary celebrations in 2008, the side of the Senate House was illuminated with a light show, illustrating aspects of the history of the university.

== Traditions and legends ==
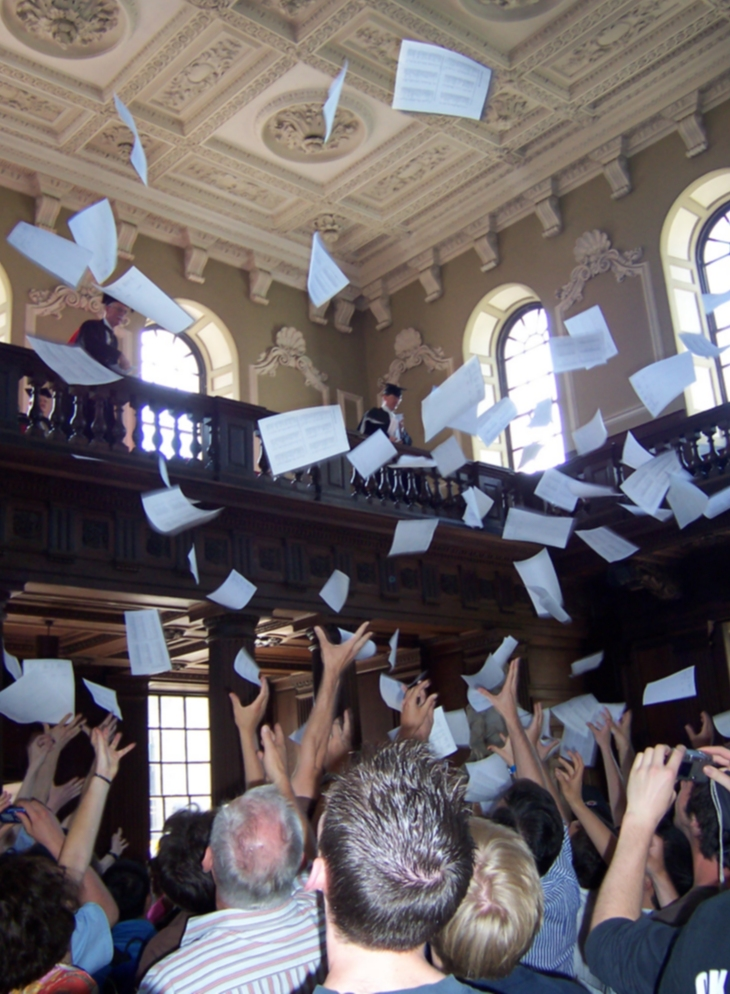
Class lists for Part III of the Mathematical Tripos, June 2005

=== Mathematical Tripos results ===
At the end of the academic year, class-lists for most degrees are posted up on the outer wall of the building. The results of Part II and Part III of the Mathematical Tripos, however, are read out to the waiting students from the balcony of the Senate House, after which piles of class-lists are thrown to the ground from the balcony like confetti in a time-honored manner.

=== Austin Seven ===
A battered Austin Seven van was found on the apex of the Senate House roof on the morning of 8 June 1958. The van had been placed there the night before by a party of engineering students from Gonville & Caius College. They found the derelict Austin Seven in Harston and towed it into Cambridge. They removed the engine and rear axle to make it light enough to winch up to the roof, and hauled it up using cables and scaffolding they'd stolen from King's College. It took the university a week to get the van down and the prank received much media attention at the time.

A variety of similar student pranks have been carried out on the roof of the building since. Most notably, a fully-decorated Christmas tree was placed on the corner of the Senate House roof in November 2022, assumed to be the work of night climbers.

== BBC Election Debate 2017 ==
On 31 May 2017, Senate House hosted the BBC Election Debate ahead of the UK General Election eight days later.

Mishal Husain chaired audience questions for Jeremy Corbyn, Tim Farron, Caroline Lucas, Paul Nuttall, Angus Robertson, Amber Rudd, and Leanne Wood.
