= Francis Jenkinson =

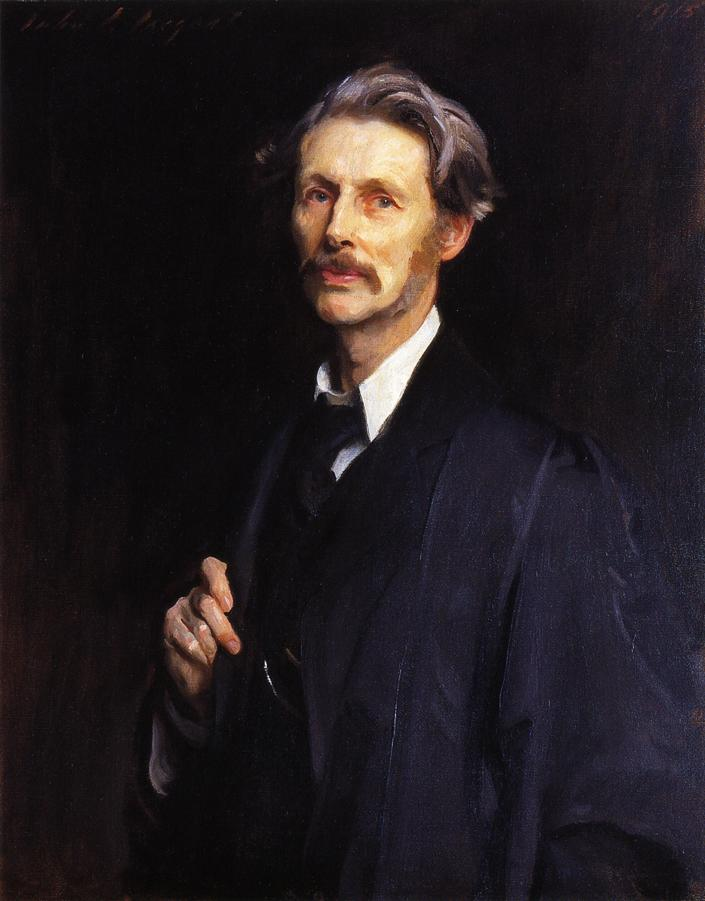
Francis J. H. Jenkinson by John Singer Sargent, 1915.

Francis John Henry Jenkinson (20 August 1853 – 21 September 1923) was a librarian of the University of Cambridge 1889–1923. He was succeeded by A. F. Scholfield.

== Life ==
Jenkinson was born in the town of Forres, Moray in Scotland. He was educated at Marlborough College, and matriculated in 1872 at Trinity College, Cambridge, where in 1876 he gained a B.A. with a first class in the Classical Tripos; he graduated M.A. in 1879. In 1878 he became a Fellow of Trinity fellow, lecturing in Classics between 1881 and 1889. Jenkinson married Marian Sydney Wetton in 1887.

Whilst librarian at Cambridge, Jenkinson oversaw the acquisition of various collections, including Lord Acton's library and material from the Cairo Genizah. During World War I he began what is known as the War Reserve Collection, which includes unofficial and personal items and ephemera such as flyers, cards and journals as well as public school rolls of honour and weekly casualty lists. He made a public appeal for donations to the collection, following which donations were received from members of the armed forces, personal contacts, and members of the public.

Jenkinson was the fourth president of the Bibliographical Society, serving from 1900 to 1902. He received the honorary degree Doctor of Letters (D.Litt.) from the University of Oxford in October 1902, in connection with the tercentenary of the Bodleian Library. In 1908, he delivered the Sandars Lecture; published in The Library in 1926, his lecture examined “Books printed at Cologne by U. Zell”.

== Death and legacy ==
After undergoing an operation, Jenkinson died on 23 September 1923. In 2023, the centenary of his death, a full-day symposium in his honour was held at Cambridge University Library. Entitled ‘The Care of Books Is a Difficult Business’, it featured scholarly papers on Jenkinson’s life, work, and connections, along with displays of Jenkinsoniana and of John Singer Sargent’s portrait of Jenkinson.
