= John Lodge (librarian) =

English librarian

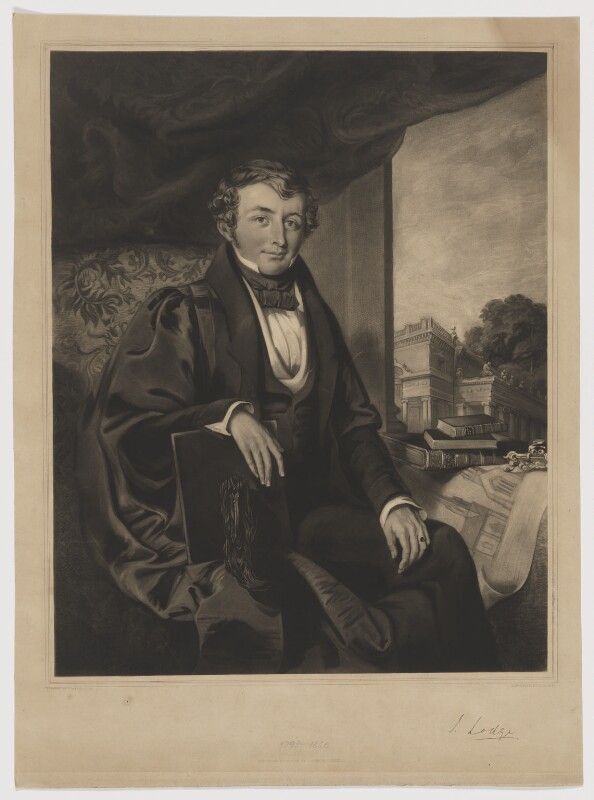
- Born: 1792/93
- Died: 1850

John Lodge (1792/93 – 27 August 1850) was the librarian (bibliothecarius) of the University of Cambridge from 1828 to 1845.
