= Jessica Gardner =

Director of the Cambridge University Library

- Gardner in 2023
- Born: 1971 (age 54–55)

Academic background
- Education: University of Leeds

Academic work
- Institutions: University of Exeter; University of Bristol; University of Cambridge

Jessica Pearsall Gardner (born July 1971) is an English academic librarian who has been the University librarian of the University of Cambridge since April 2017. Gardner is a Fellow of Selwyn College.

She received a doctorate in modern literary archives from the University of Leeds. Her previous positions were head of Library and Culture Services at the University of Exeter and then University Librarian at the University of Bristol.
