= Congregation (university) =

Graduation ceremony

A congregation can refer to "an assembly of senior members of a university". It is used in this general sense in both of the ancient universities of England, although with significant differences. At Cambridge, and at many other universities in England and around the world, it particularly refers to such assemblies when held as graduation ceremonies, while at Oxford it is the governing body of the university.

== Usage ==
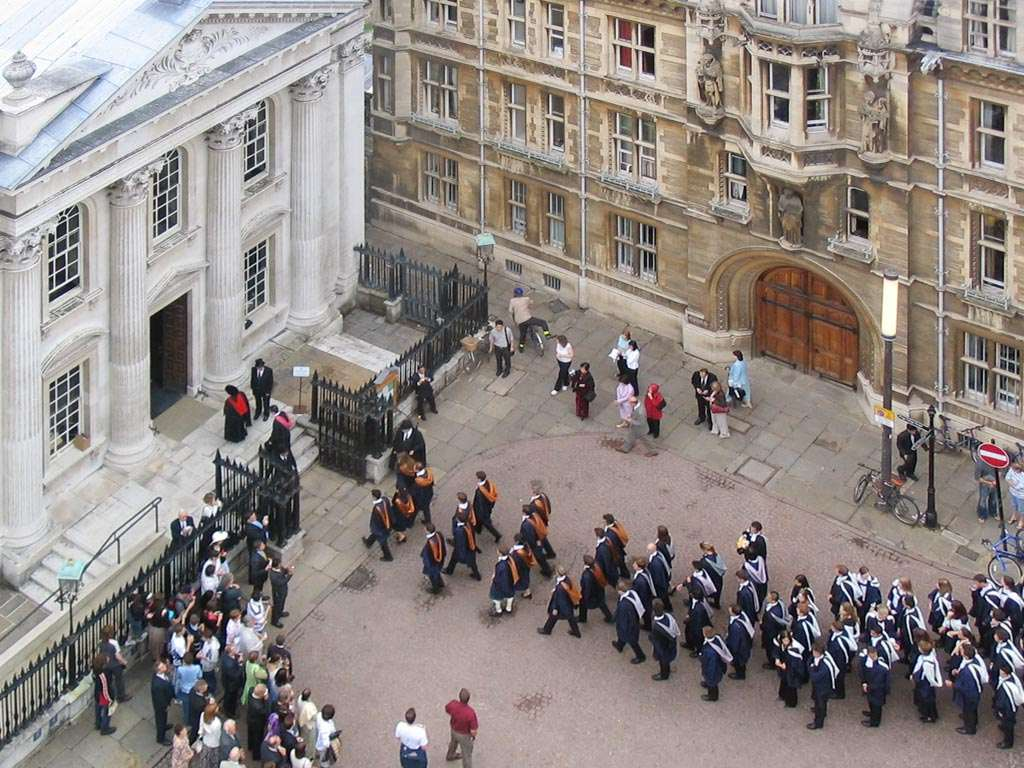
Graduands entering the Senate House, Cambridge, for a congregation

At the University of Cambridge, the term normally refers to congregations (meetings) of the Regent House, the governing body of the university. Historically, such meetings voted on many matters – Samuel Pepys records attending a congregation on 10 October 1662 to elect various officers of the university. Congregations are now principally held to confer degrees, that is, as graduation ceremonies.

At the University of Oxford, congregation is the sovereign governing body of the university, rather than the meeting of that body. It has over 5,000 members, including all university academic staff as well as other senior university staff and members of college governing bodies. Its powers include amending the university's statutes and regulations, conferring degrees, electing various university officers and approving the appointment of the vice-chancellor.

At Durham University, degrees have been awarded at congregations of the university since 1938; prior to this they were conferred at meetings of convocation, the assembly of the university's members. In addition to graduation ceremonies, the term is used for the ceremonial assembly of the university for the installation of the chancellor of the university.

Congregation is also used as the name of the graduation ceremony at other universities in England, including the University of Birmingham, the University of Warwick, the University of Kent, Northumbria University and Newcastle University. In Canada, the term is also used by the University of British Columbia. In Hong Kong, it is used by the University of Hong Kong and Hong Kong Metropolitan University.

== See also ==
- University council
- Academic senate
- General Council (Scottish university)
