= Trinity Lane =

Street in Cambridge, England

Coordinates: 52.2064°N 0.1165°E

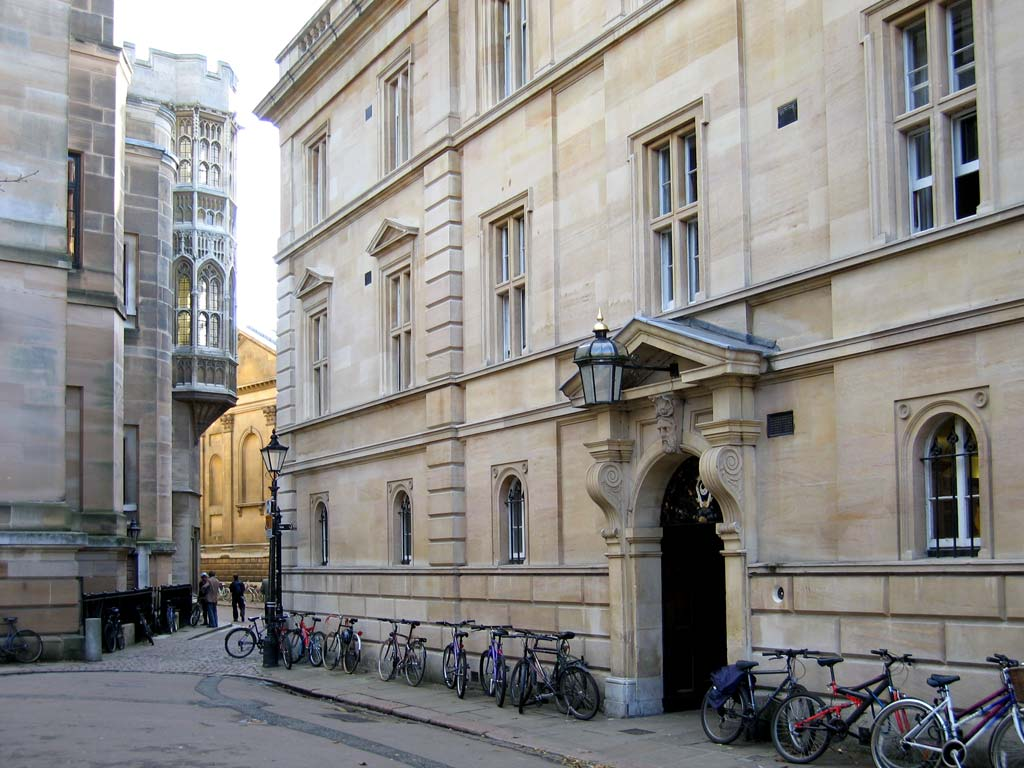
Trinity Hall on Trinity Lane

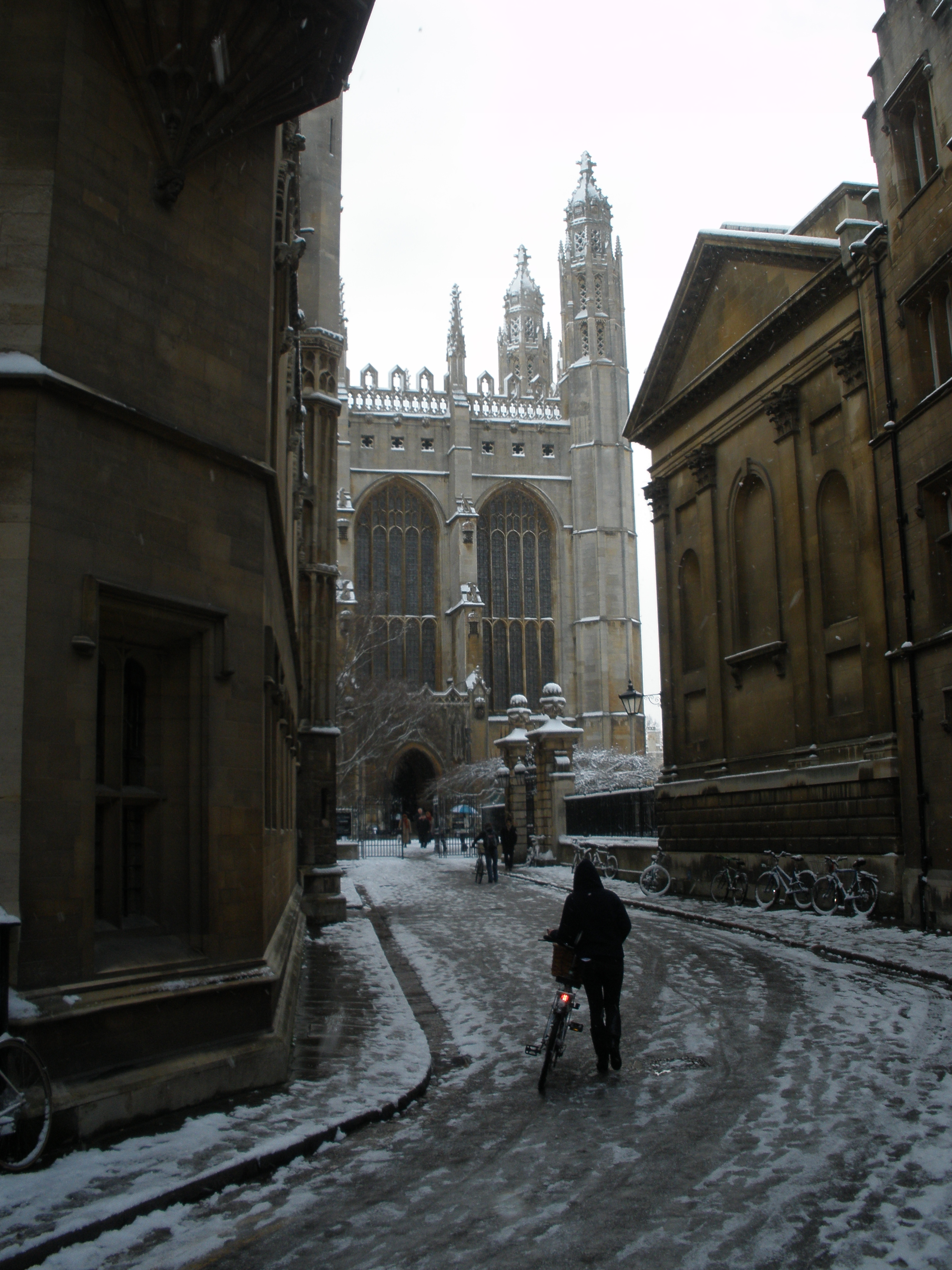
King's College Chapel in the snow at the end of Trinity Lane with Clare College on the right

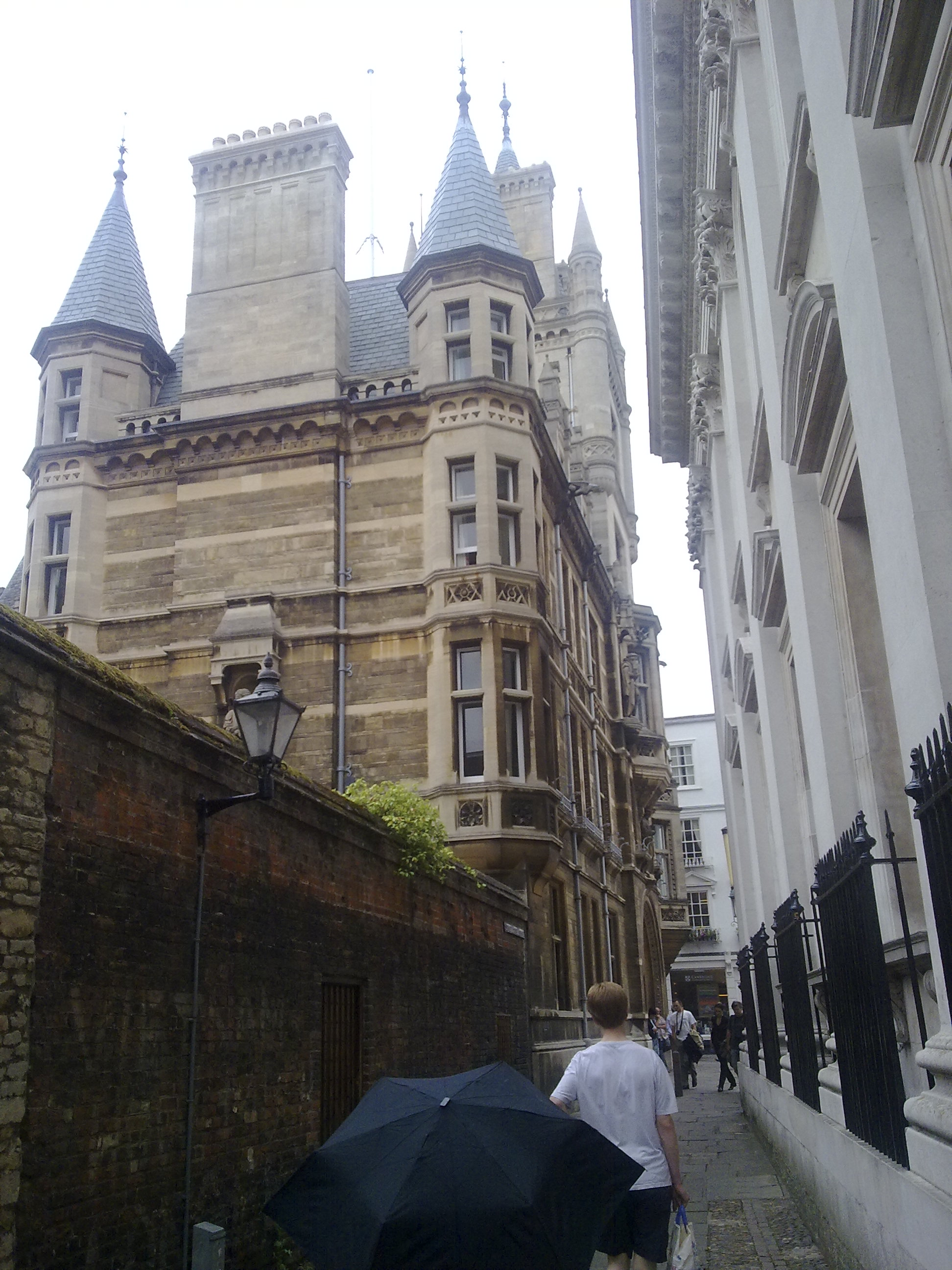
Gonville and Caius College on the left and Senate House on the right, looking along Senate House Passage

The Senate House Passage, looking east towards Gonville and Caius College and the Senate House

Trinity Lane is a street in the centre of Cambridge, England that passes through portions of the University of Cambridge, one of the world's most prestigious universities. The lane leads off Trinity Street.

At the entrance to the lane from Trinity Street as it leads west, Trinity College is located on the north side of the lane, including Nevile's Gate, and Gonville and Caius College is on the south side. The lane then turns south around the back of Gonville and Caius. Here, Trinity Hall is to the west. At the end of the lane is Clare College to the west and King's College with its huge Chapel blocking the way to the south. Here the Old Schools are also to be found to the east and beyond that the University of Cambridge Senate House where degree ceremonies are held, on King's Parade. The Old Schools now house the Cambridge University Offices, which form the main administration for the university.

Senate House Passage is a pedestrian passageway that links from near the end of Trinity Lane back to Trinity Street. Gonville and Caius College is to the north and the Senate House is to the south.

== History ==
Trinity Lane originally linked the High Street (now Trinity Street) with the wharfs on the River Cam. In the 16th century, the east–west part of the lane was known as Find Silver Lane or King's Childer Lane and the north–south section formed part of Mill Street. Before King's College was built, this street continued on to what is now known as Queens' Lane, leading off the north of Silver Street. Trinity Lane has changed little for several centuries.
