= Anne Jarvis =

Librarian at the University of Cambridge (born 1962)

Anne Jarvis (born 31 July 1962) was the first woman to be the University Librarian at the University of Cambridge. She held the office of Cambridge University Librarian from January 2009 until September 2016. Since October 2016 she has been the Princeton University librarian.

Jarvis studied history at Trinity College, Dublin, and later worked at that institution's library as Sub-Librarian, Collection Management. From 2000 to 2009 she worked at Cambridge University Library as Deputy Librarian, and has also been affiliated to Wolfson College, Cambridge. In April 2016, she announced her move to be University Librarian at Princeton University.
