= Oxford University Gazette =

UK periodical

- Publisher: University of Oxford
- Founded: 1870
- Language: English
- Website: www.ox.ac.uk/about/how-we-are-run/gazette

The Oxford University Gazette (often simply known as the Gazette locally) is the journal of record for the University of Oxford in England, used for official announcements. It is published weekly during term time.

The Gazette has been published continuously since 1870. It provides information such as the following:

- University legislation
- Official announcements
- Announcements of events, such as lectures, exhibitions
- Appointments to University posts, such as professorships, etc.
- Vacancies for academic (and some non-academic) posts
- Notices concerning grants available
- Classified advertisements

The Gazette is published weekly throughout the University's academic year (from September to July), but less regularly during the University's vacation periods. A number of supplements are also published giving various types of official information.

The Gazette was a print publication between 1870 and the 1990s, then moved to print and online publication. It has been a digital-first publication since 2020.

Most of the material in the Gazette is available on the World Wide Web. However, due to the UK Data Protection Act some of the printed version of the Gazette has not been included online since September 2001.

The Gazette was formerly published by the Oxford University Press but is now an in-house publication of the University of Oxford's Public Affairs Directorate.
