= Regent House =

Governing body of the University of Cambridge

The Regent House is the governing body of the University of Cambridge. It consists of academics, senior researchers, heads of colleges, librarians, curators, and administrators. It currently has more than 7,200 members.

Meetings of the Regent House are known as congregations, and are chaired by the Proctors, the chancellor, the vice-chancellor, or the master of one of the colleges.

In recent times relatively few Congregations have actually been held. Instead most important business, including elections for members of the council, the Board of Scrutiny and the Senate of the university, is conducted by postal ballots of its members. The main exceptions are the Congregations held to award degrees, the largest of which is at the end of Easter term, when undergraduates receive their degrees in sessions spread over three days known as General Admission. These Congregations are held in the university's Senate House.
