= St Edward's Passage =

Street in Cambridge, United Kingdom

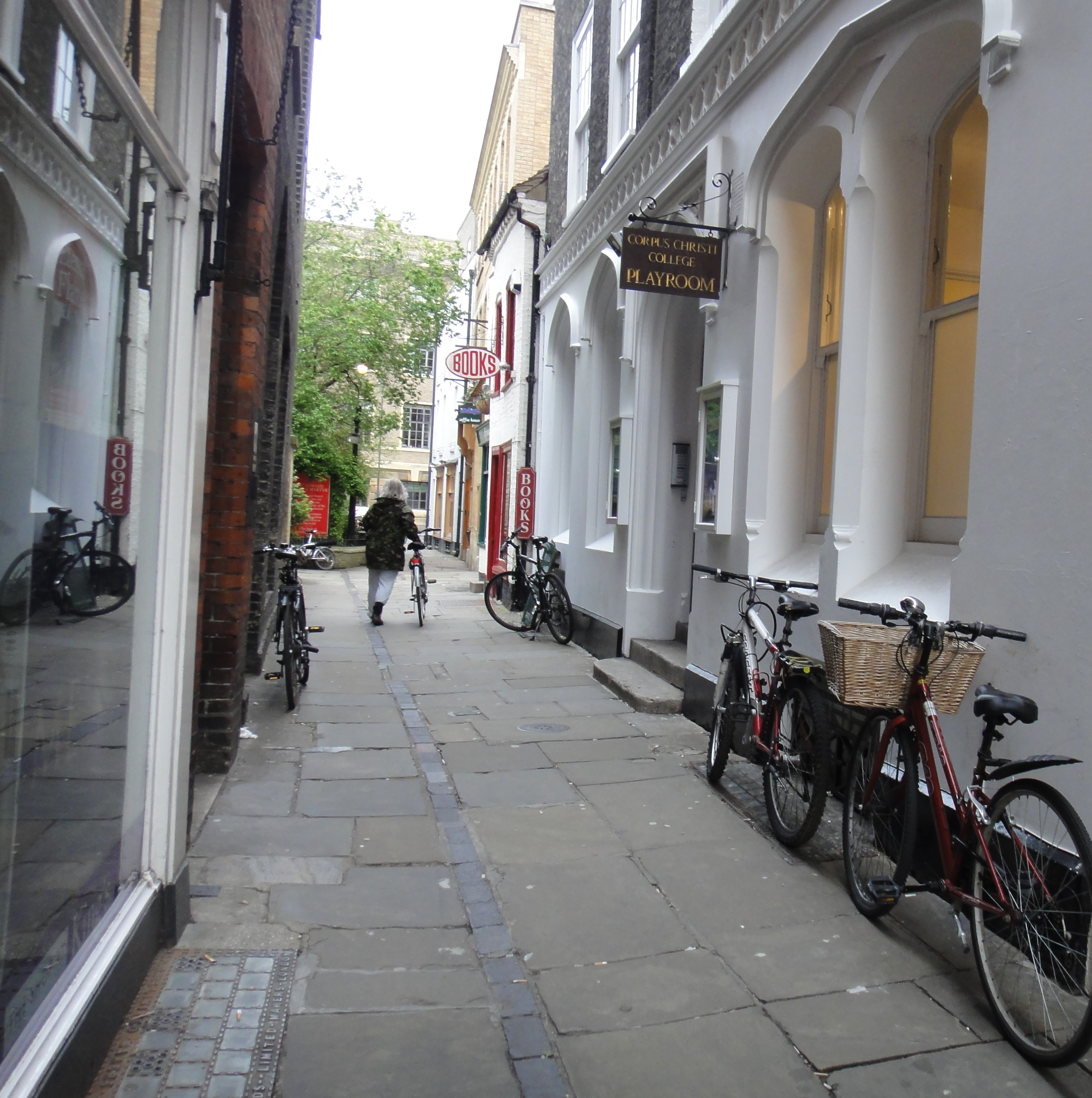
- St Edward's Passage, looking from King's Parade to Peas Hill
- Interactive map of St Edward's Passage
- Maintained by: Cambridge City Council
- Length: 145.40 m (477.0 ft)
- Location: Cambridge, England
- Postal code: CB2 3PJ
- Coordinates: 52.2045°N 0.1178°E

Construction
- Construction start: c. 13th century

St Edward's Passage, known in the 18th century as Chain Lane, is a Y-shaped alleyway in Cambridge, England, between King's Parade—opposite the main gate of King's College—and Peas Hill. It houses the entrance and churchyard of the Church of St Edward King and Martyr; the Cambridge Arts Theatre; several cottages; G. David, an independent bookshop run from the same building since 1896; a few businesses; and student accommodation. It is a narrow, dark lane, with riven-stone paving, which opens out onto the much wider and sunnier King's Parade.

Excavations on the southern side in 1995 suggested that the lane had been established by the 13th century. It is marked on Richard Lyne's map of the city from 1574, the earliest known map of Cambridge, and on John Hammond's from 1592. According to Cambridge City Council, it "preserv[es] a sense of the cheek-by-jowl nature of the early town".

== Buildings ==
=== St Edward King and Martyr ===
The entrance of St Edward King and Martyr, which dates to the early 13th century, is on St Edward's Passage, at the Peas Hill end. Its small churchyard lies between the two arms of the alley.

Calling itself the cradle of the English Reformation—a period of religious upheaval in the 16th century, when the English Church opposed the authority of the Roman Catholic Church—the church contains the original pulpit from which the Protestant reformers Robert Barnes (1495–1540), Thomas Bilney (1495–1531) and Hugh Latimer (1487–1555) preached. During midnight mass in the church on 24 December 1525, Barnes, an Augustinian friar who became a Lutheran, gave the first sermon in which a reformer accused the Catholic Church of heresy. (Note: None of Barnes's sermons were preserved.) Historian Alec Ryrie referred to it as "the first set-piece confrontation of the English Reformation". Barnes, Bilney and Latimer were eventually burned at the stake. (Note: Just before he was burned, in Broad Street, Oxford, Hugh Latimer told a fellow reformer, Nicholas Ridley, who was also being burned: "Be of good comfort, Master Ridley, and play the man. We shall this day light such a candle by God's grace in England, as I trust shall never be put out.")

=== Other buildings ===
Most of the buildings are brick fronted, date from the late 18th and early 19th century, and have vertically hung sash windows. Several (nos. 3, 4, 8–10, 12–15, 15a and 16) are Grade II-listed buildings.

The Cambridge Arts Theatre and the Venue (a restaurant) are at no. 6, the Indigo Coffee House at no. 8, and the Haunted Bookshop at no. 9. The building at no. 10 has Gothic detailing and was originally built for the Church of England's Young Men's Society; it now houses the Corpus Christi College Playroom (a theatre). The building at nos. 12–15, a lime-washed two-storey brick building dating to the late 18th and early 19th century, is used for student accommodation. G. David, established in 1896 by Gustave David (1860–1936) and known as David's bookshop, is at no. 16. There is also a row of late 18th-century two-storey cottages.

=== Status, age and type ===
Building	Status	Age	Height	Walls	Roof	Architect	Notes
St Edward King and Martyr	Listed Grade II*	13th–15th C	n/a	"stone, rubble, cement rendered with some Barnack stone dressings"	lead and tile	restored 1858–1860 by G. G. Scott	
1 and 2 (Peas Hill)		early 20th c.	4 + attic	brown brick	mansard/slate	n/a	
3 and 4	Listed Grade II	early 19th c.	2 + attics	brick	parapet/tile	n/a	
6 and 7 (Arts Theatre)		19th c., redeveloped in 1990s	3 + attics	"buff brick with stone dressings"	mansard/slate	redevelopment by Bland, Brown & Cole, 1990s	
8	Listed Grade II	early 19th c.	2 + attics	lime-washed brick	tile	n/a	
9	Listed Grade II	late 18th c.	2	lime-washed brick	tile	n/a	
10 (Corpus Christi Playroom)	Listed Grade II	early 19th C "G/F altered later"	3	grey gault brick	parapet	n/a	originally the Church of England Young Men's Society
12–15	Listed Grade II	late 18th, early 19th c.	2 + attics	lime-washed brick	mansard/tile	n/a	
15A and 16	Listed Grade II	late 18th c.	2 + attics	white-washed brick	mansard/tile	n/a	No. 16 is David's bookshop.

== Gallery ==
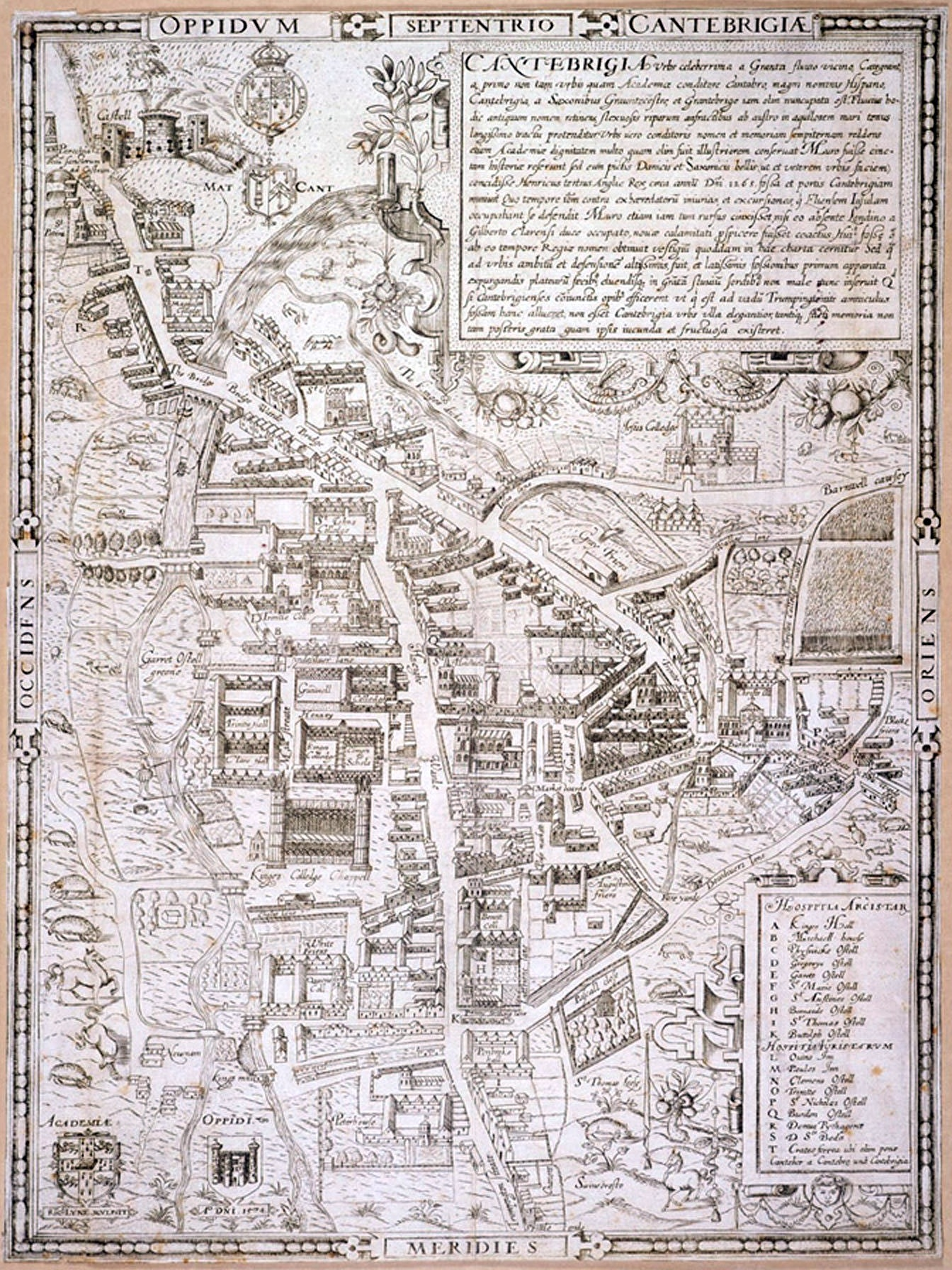
St Edward's Passage (below centre) on Richard Lyne's map of 1574

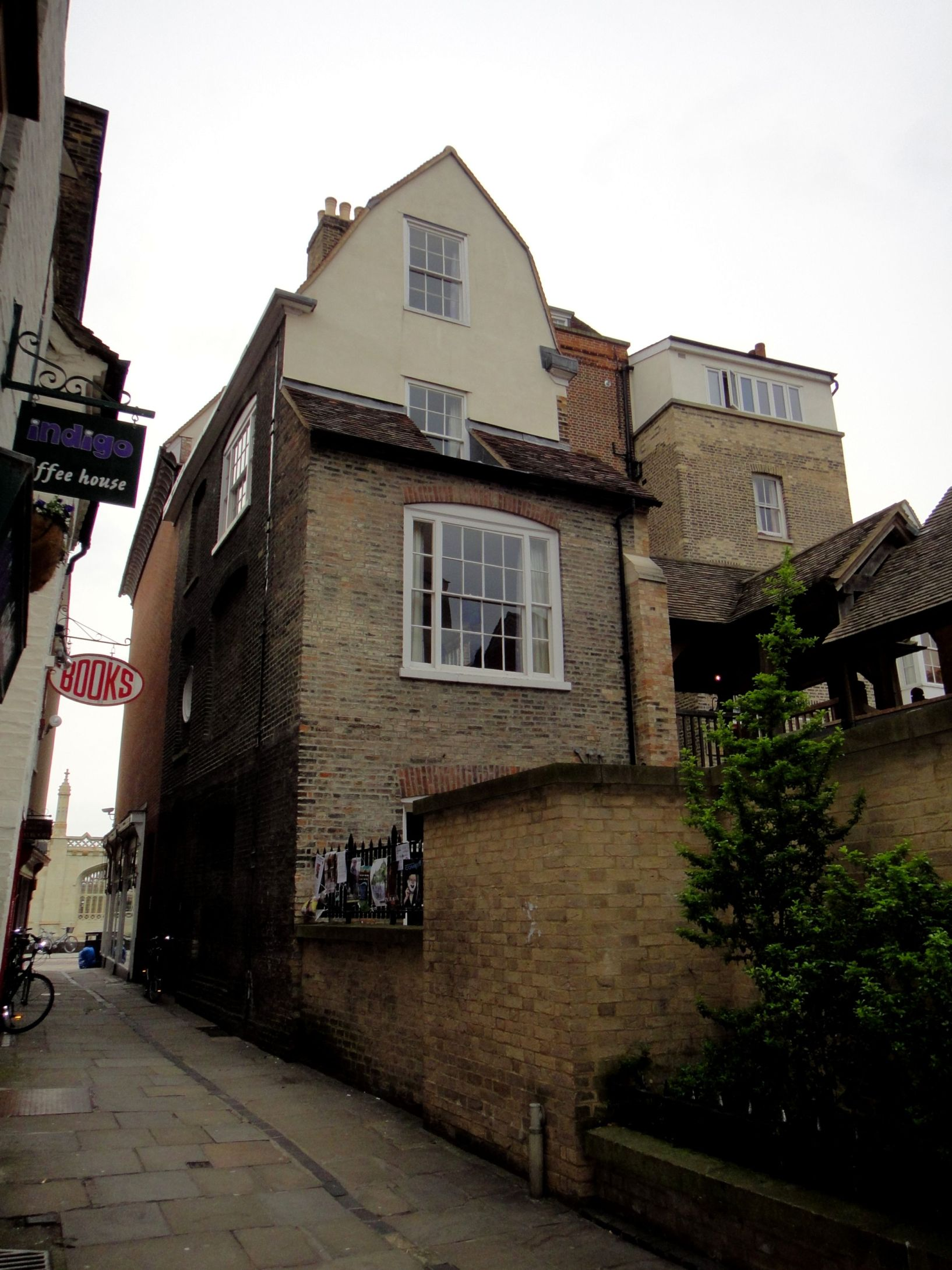
Looking toward King's Parade; the King's College screen is visible.

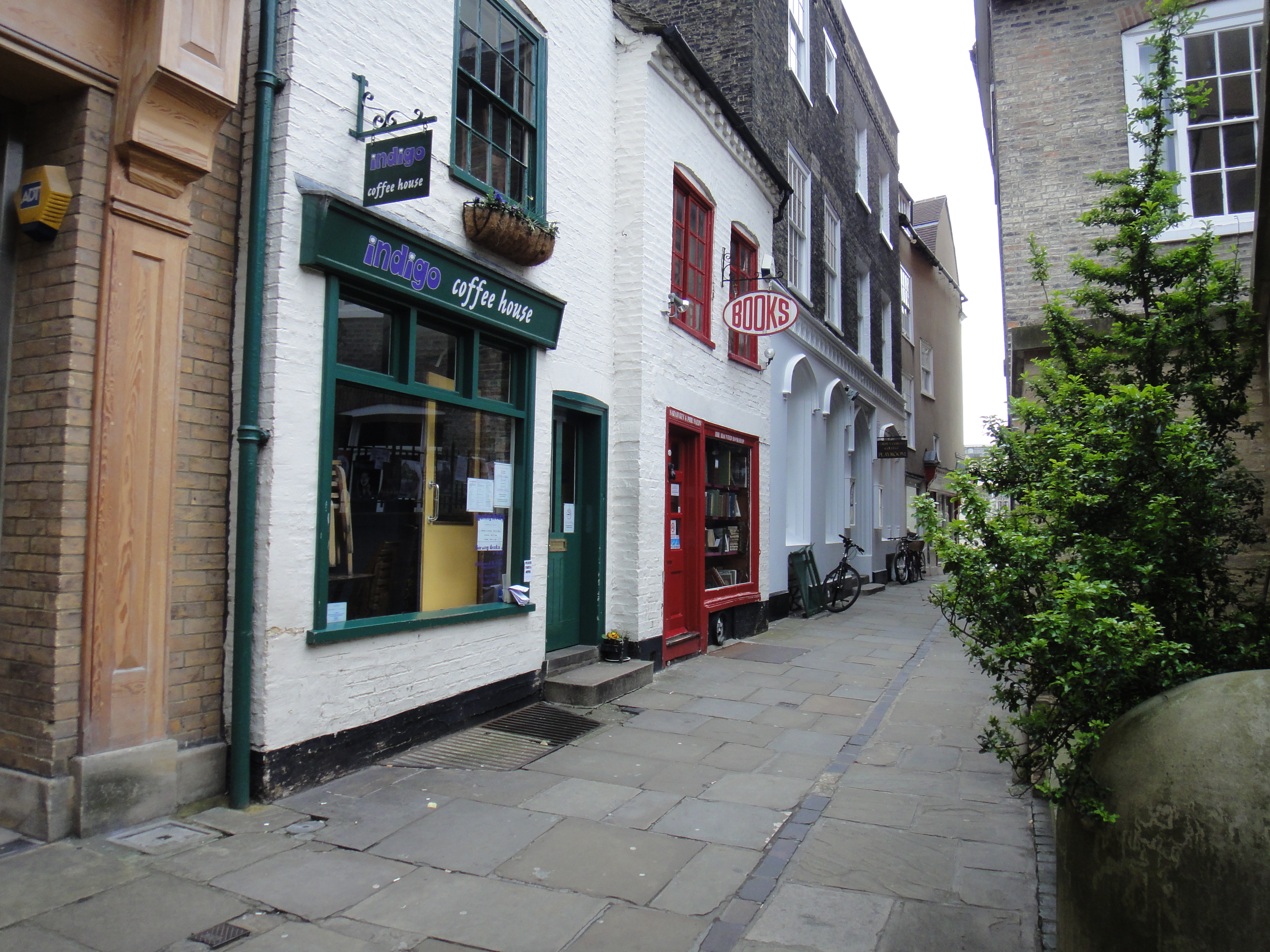
Looking toward King's Parade

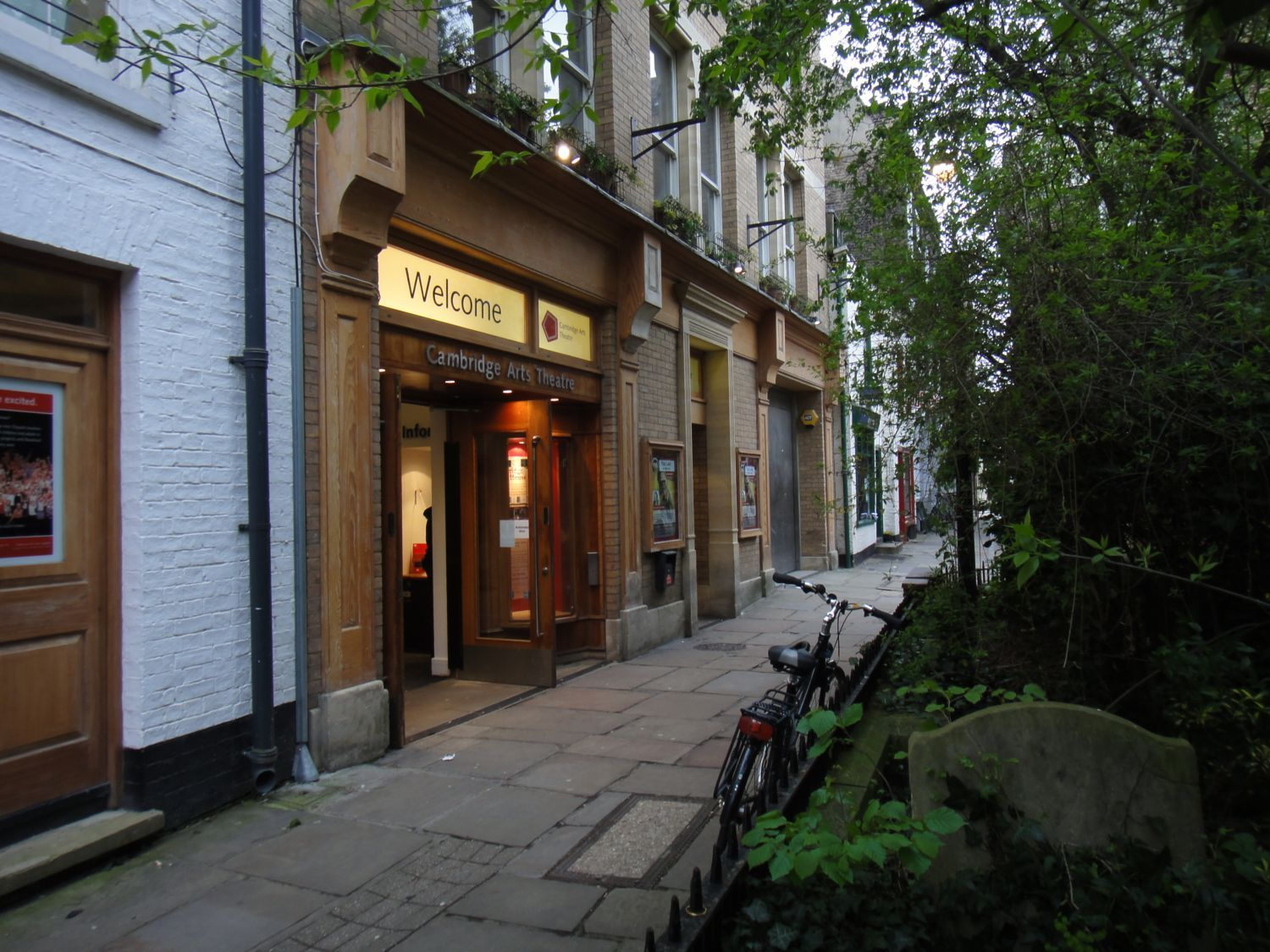
Cambridge Arts Theatre, also in the direction of King's Parade

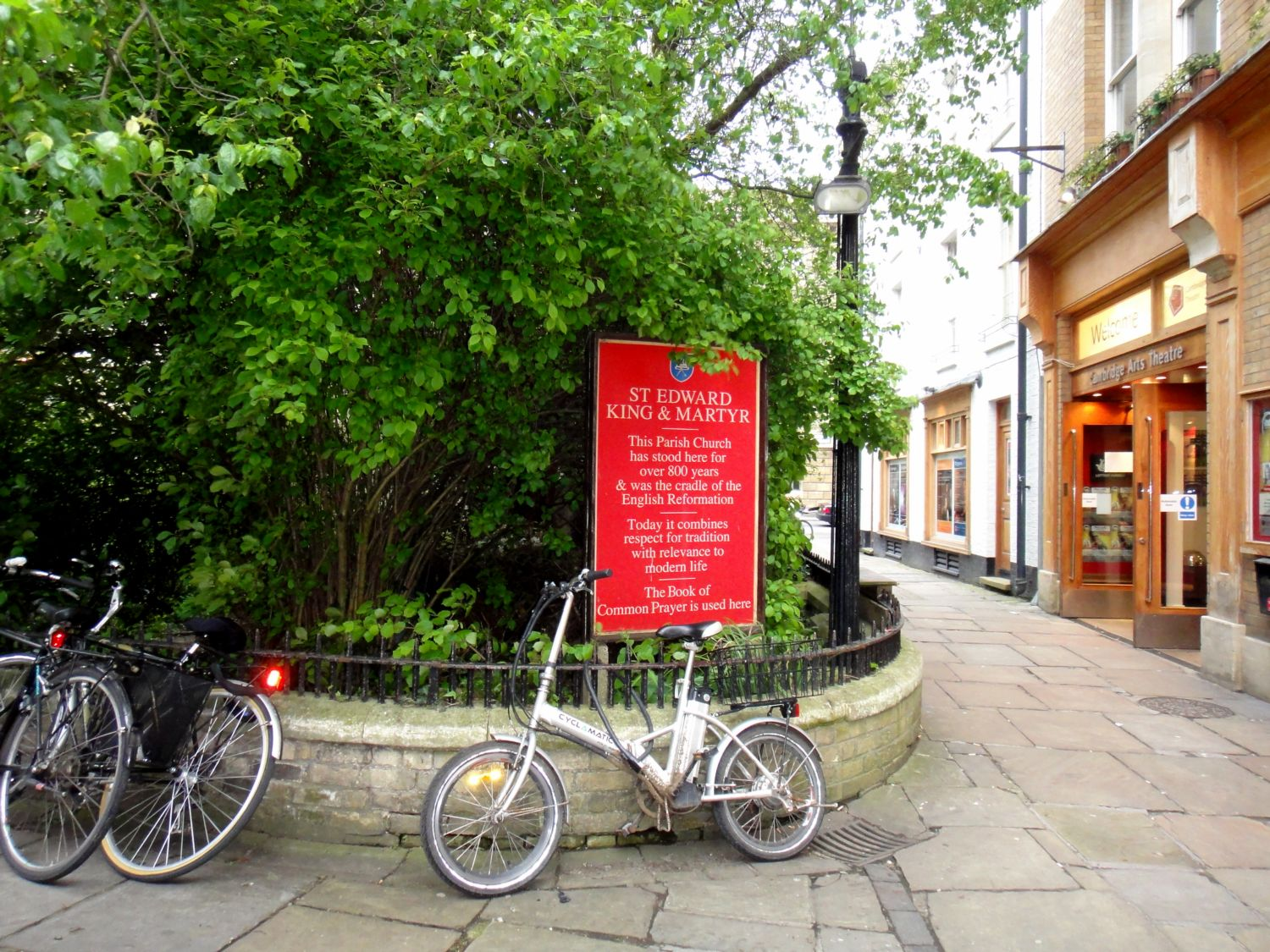
View in the opposite direction: St Edward King and Martyr churchyard

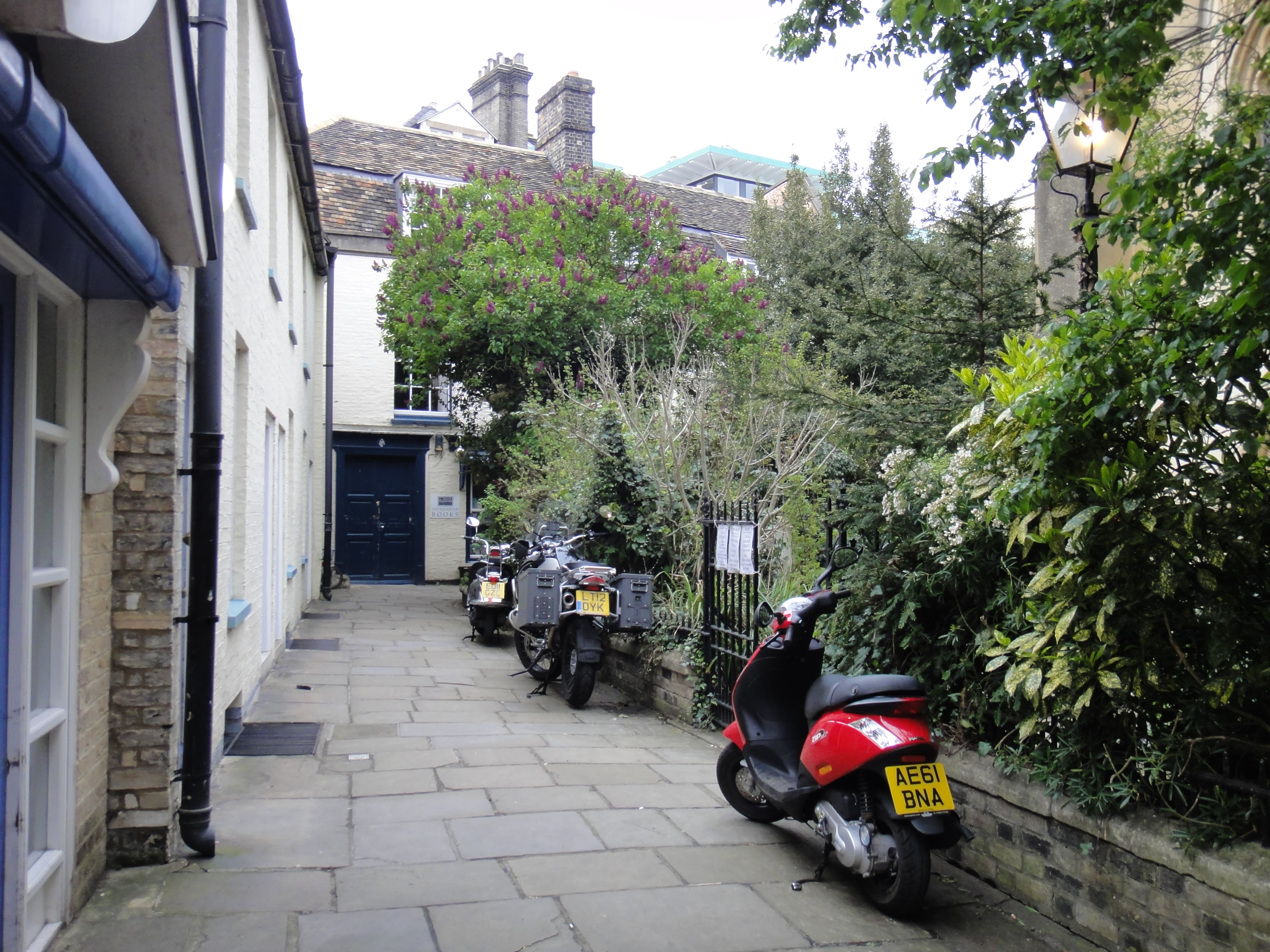
Looking toward David's bookshop; churchyard on the right

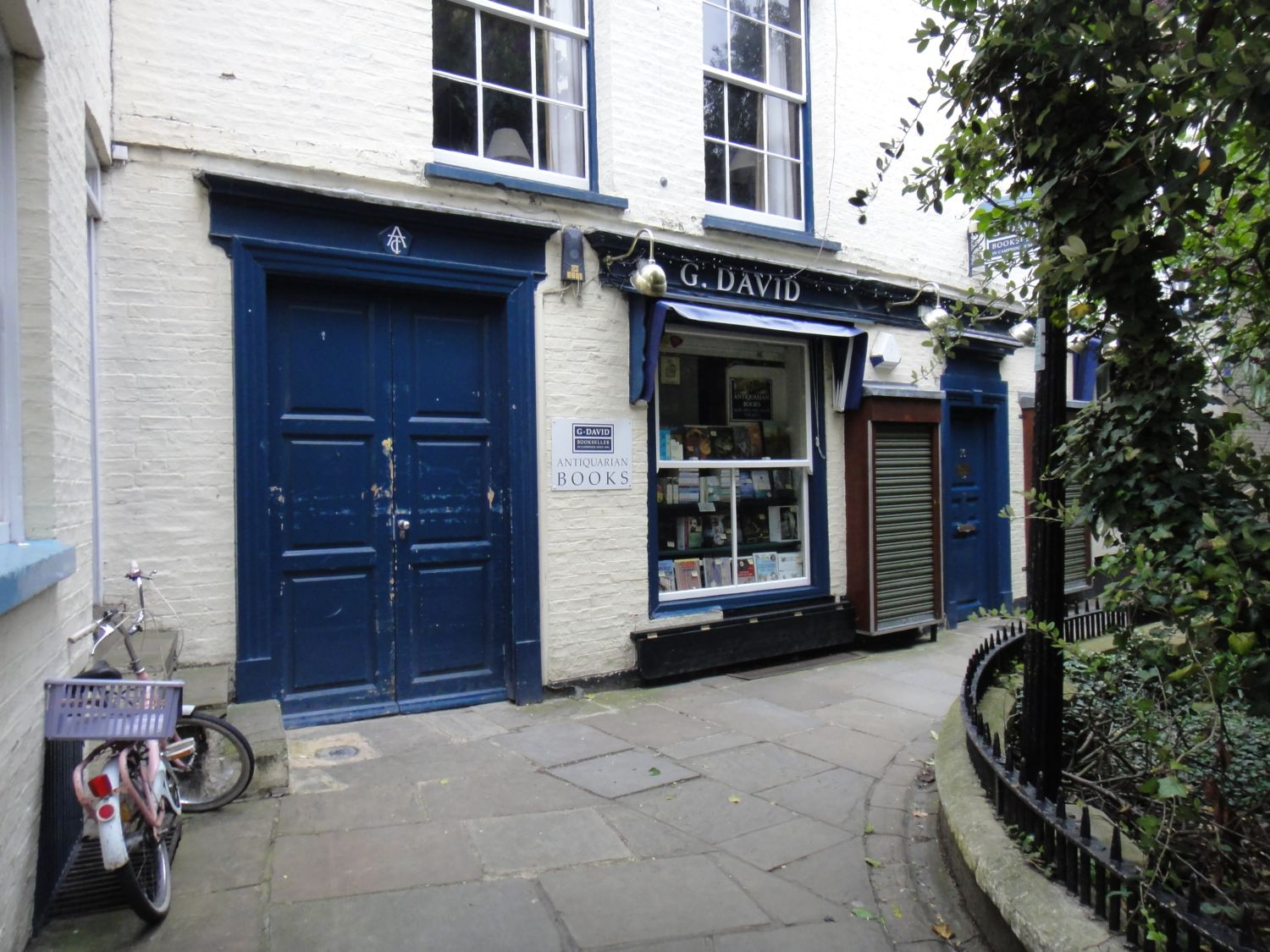
David's bookshop

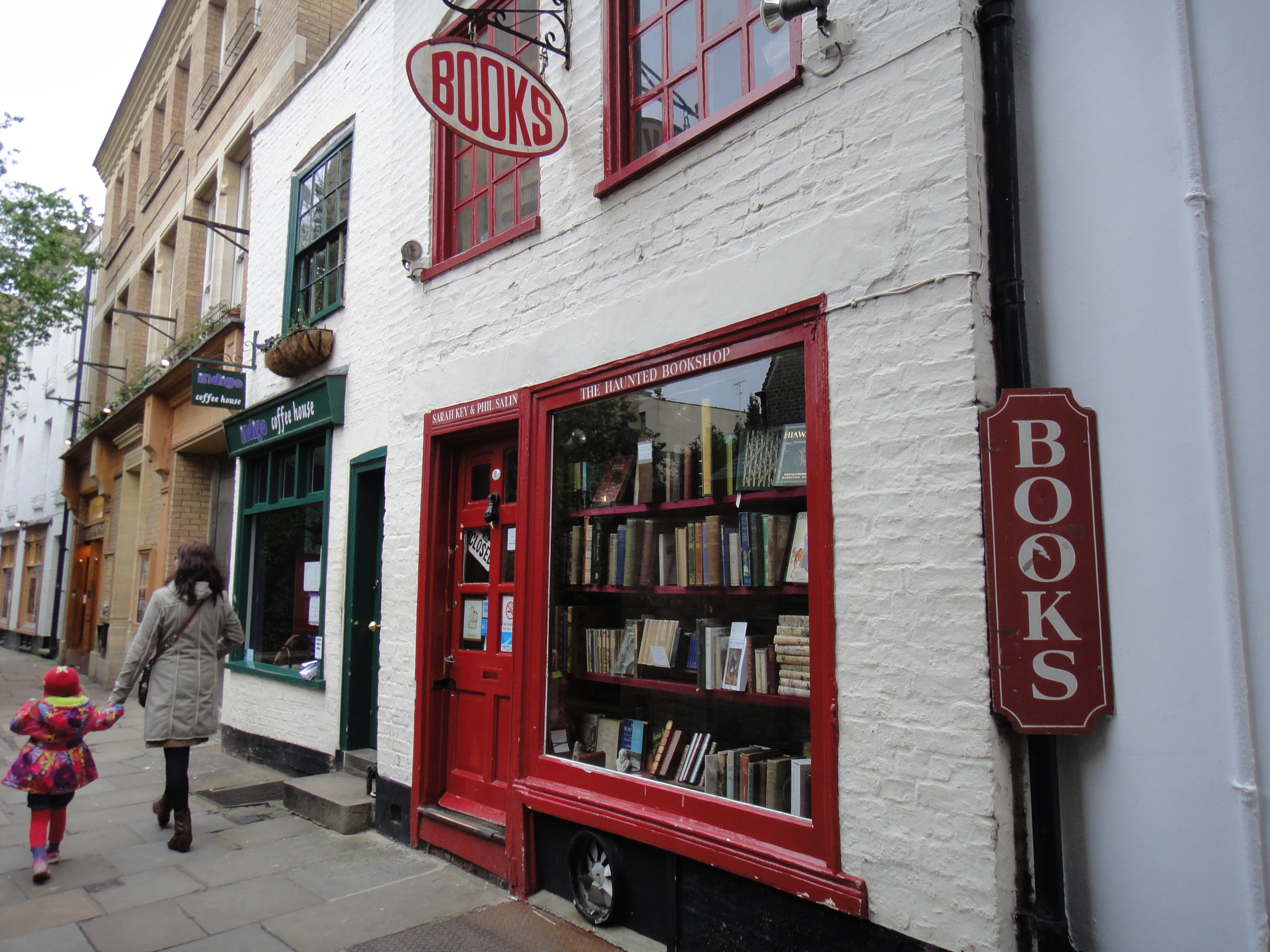
Haunted Bookshop

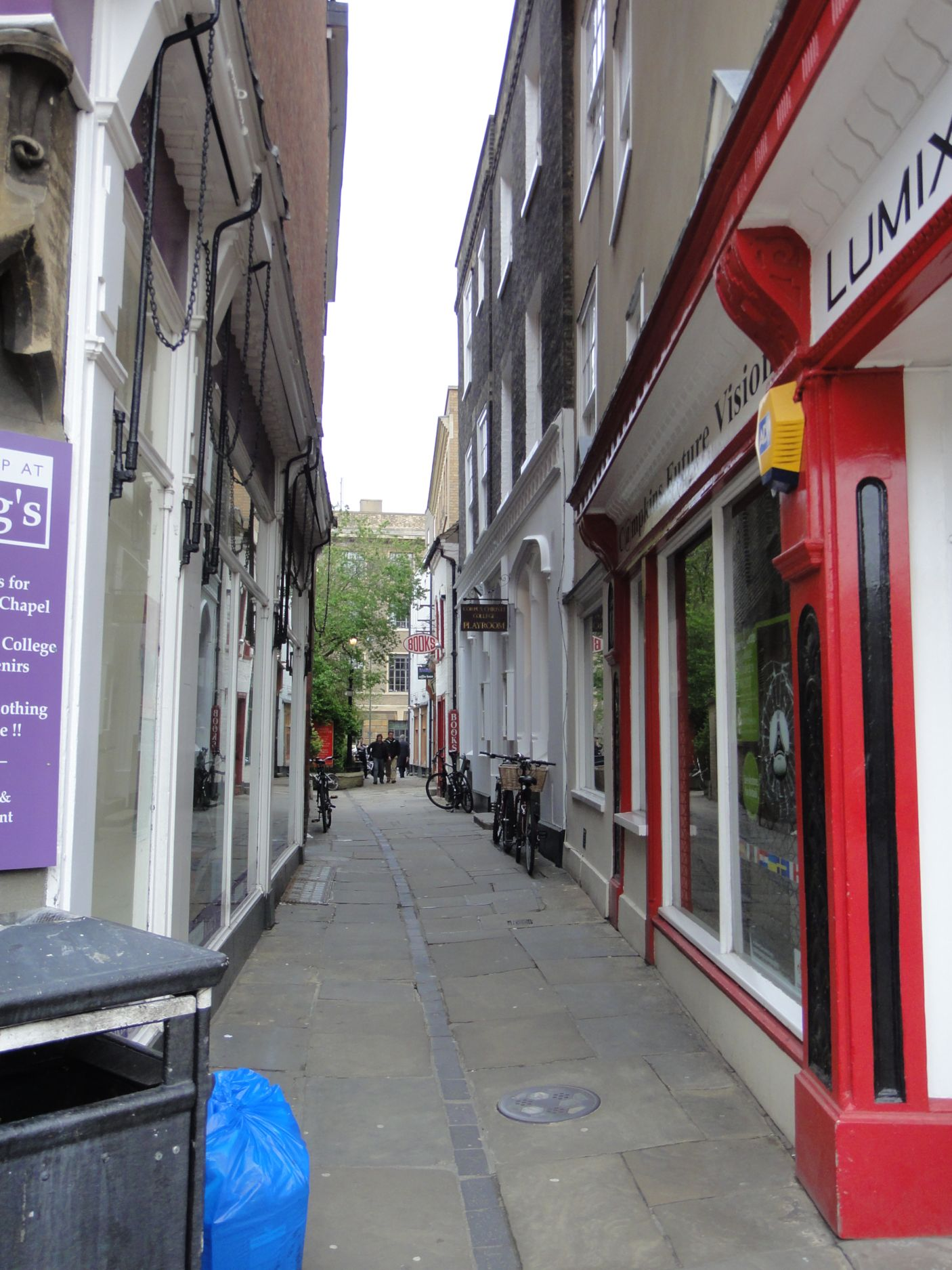
Looking from King's Parade toward Peas Hill

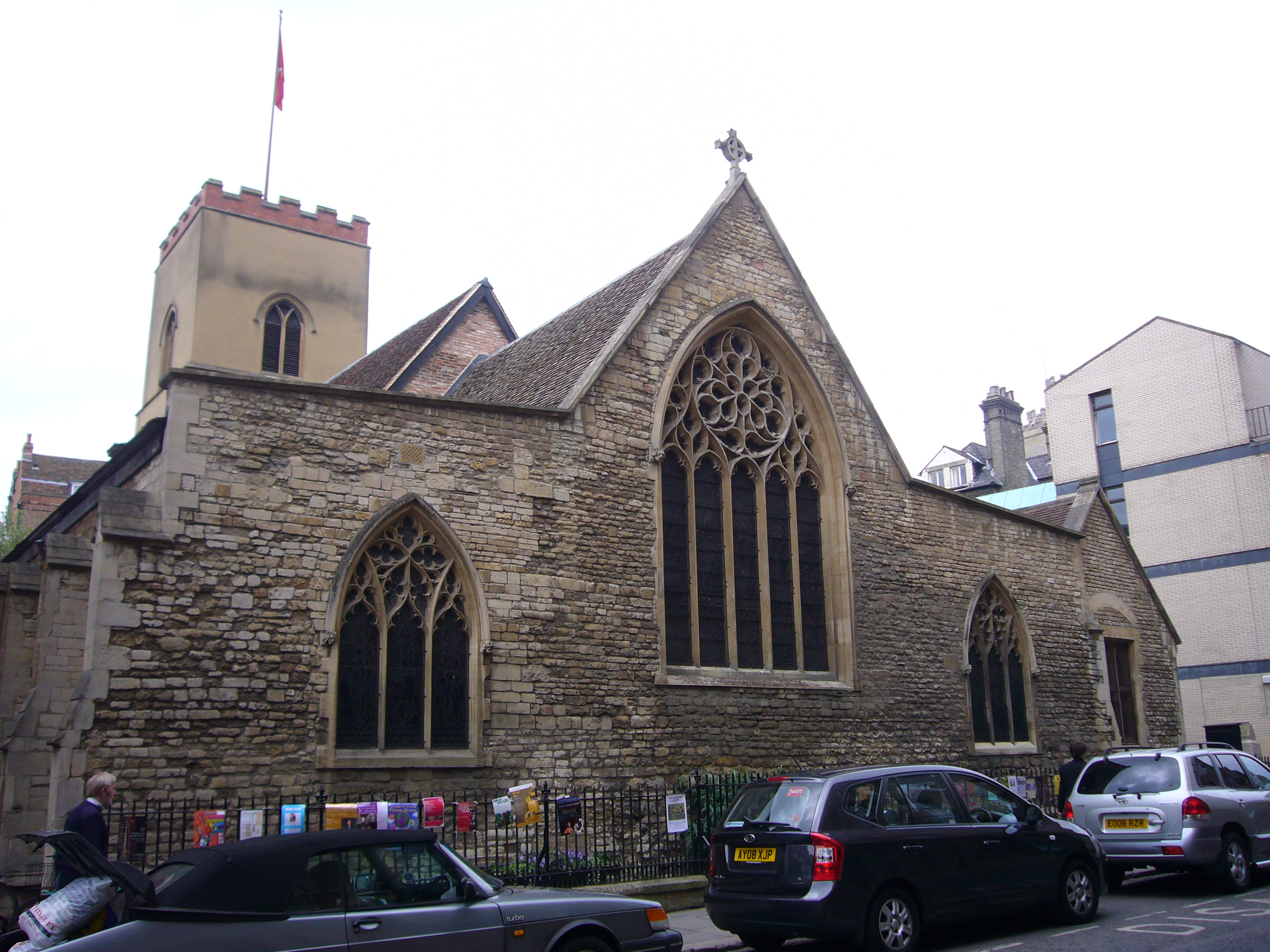
St Edward King and Martyr, Peas Hill aspect

== See also ==
- Grade II* listed buildings in Cambridge
- Grade II* listed buildings in Cambridgeshire
- Marian persecutions
- White Horse Tavern, Cambridge
