= White Horse Tavern, Cambridge =

Former tavern in Cambridge, England

Coordinates: 52.2037°N 0.1170°E

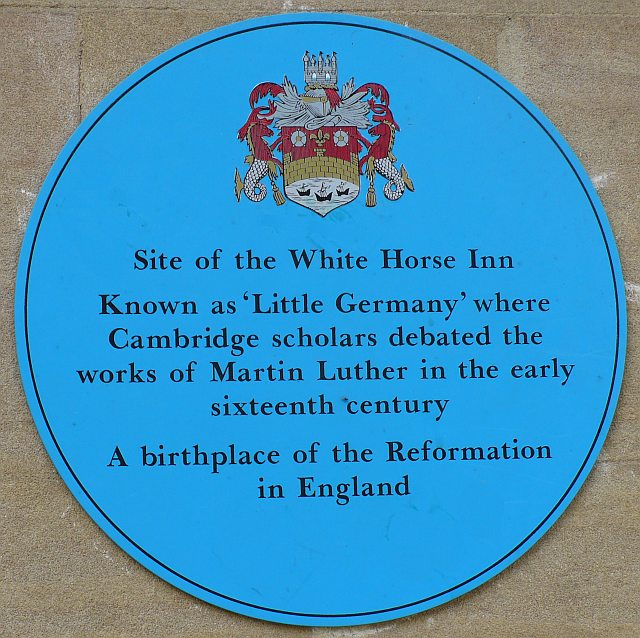
Blue plaque marking site of White Horse Inn

The White Horse Tavern or White Horse Inn was allegedly the meeting place in Cambridge for English Protestant reformers to discuss Lutheran ideas, from 1521 onwards. According to the historian Geoffrey Elton the group of university dons who met there were nicknamed "Little Germany" in reference to their discussions of Luther. Whilst the pub undoubtedly existed, several scholars have questioned the existence of the White Horse meetings – they are described by John Foxe in his Book of Martyrs, but no other evidence for them exists. Gergely M Juhász writes that "Foxe’s romantic image of these students and scholars convening secretly on a regular basis in the White Horse Inn… is unsubstantiated", and Alec Ryrie refers to it as "the stubborn legend of the White Horse Inn".

== Attendance ==
According to Foxe, among those who attended these meetings were the future Archbishop of Canterbury, Thomas Cranmer, the future Bishop of Worcester, Hugh Latimer and the reformers Robert Barnes, Thomas Bilney, Miles Coverdale, Matthew Parker, William Tyndale, Nicholas Shaxton, John Rogers and John Bale. The group also included future conservatives like Stephen Gardiner, the future Bishop of Winchester. However, according to Tyndale's biographer David Daniell, not all of these men were in Cambridge at the same time, and there is no evidence that Tyndale met any of them until after he had left Cambridge. He writes that "The hard evidence that any of them, in Cambridge, were ever in the same place at the same time, never mind together in the snug of a Tudor pub, is minimal".

About Cranmer, MacCulloch writes:

It was natural that his [Cranmer's] Protestant admirers should later give him respectable evangelical credentials for the 1520s, and that they should provide him with retrospective honorary membership of the famous White Horse Tavern...However we need to treat such well-meaning efforts with scepticism. Thirty years ago Professor C. C. Butterworth pointed out that all subsequent talk of the White Horse circle has been built up from a single reference in Foxe's Book of Martyrs; moreover, Foxe is quite specific about which colleges provided regulars for the group, and Jesus [Cranmer's college] is not among them (neither, for that matter, is Gardiner's Trinity Hall).

Further, Gascoigne observes, "He [Cranmer] seems to have played no part in the White Horse circle...," but McGrath cautions, "Although it is thought that accounts of the activities and influence of this group may have been somewhat embellished, there is no doubt that Cambridge was an important early centre for discussion of Luther's doctrine of justification by faith."

== Location ==
The tavern was located on the site of King's Lane, to the west of King's Parade. In existence by 1455, it was demolished in 1870 when the King’s College Scott’s Building was constructed. A Blue Plaque on the wall facing the point where King’s Parade becomes Trumpington Street now commemorates its original location.

== See also ==
- St Edward King and Martyr, Cambridge
- St Edward's Passage
- Michael Horton, who hosts a radio broadcast The White Horse Inn
