= Peas Hill =

Street in Cambridge, England

Coordinates: 52.2048°N 0.1188°E

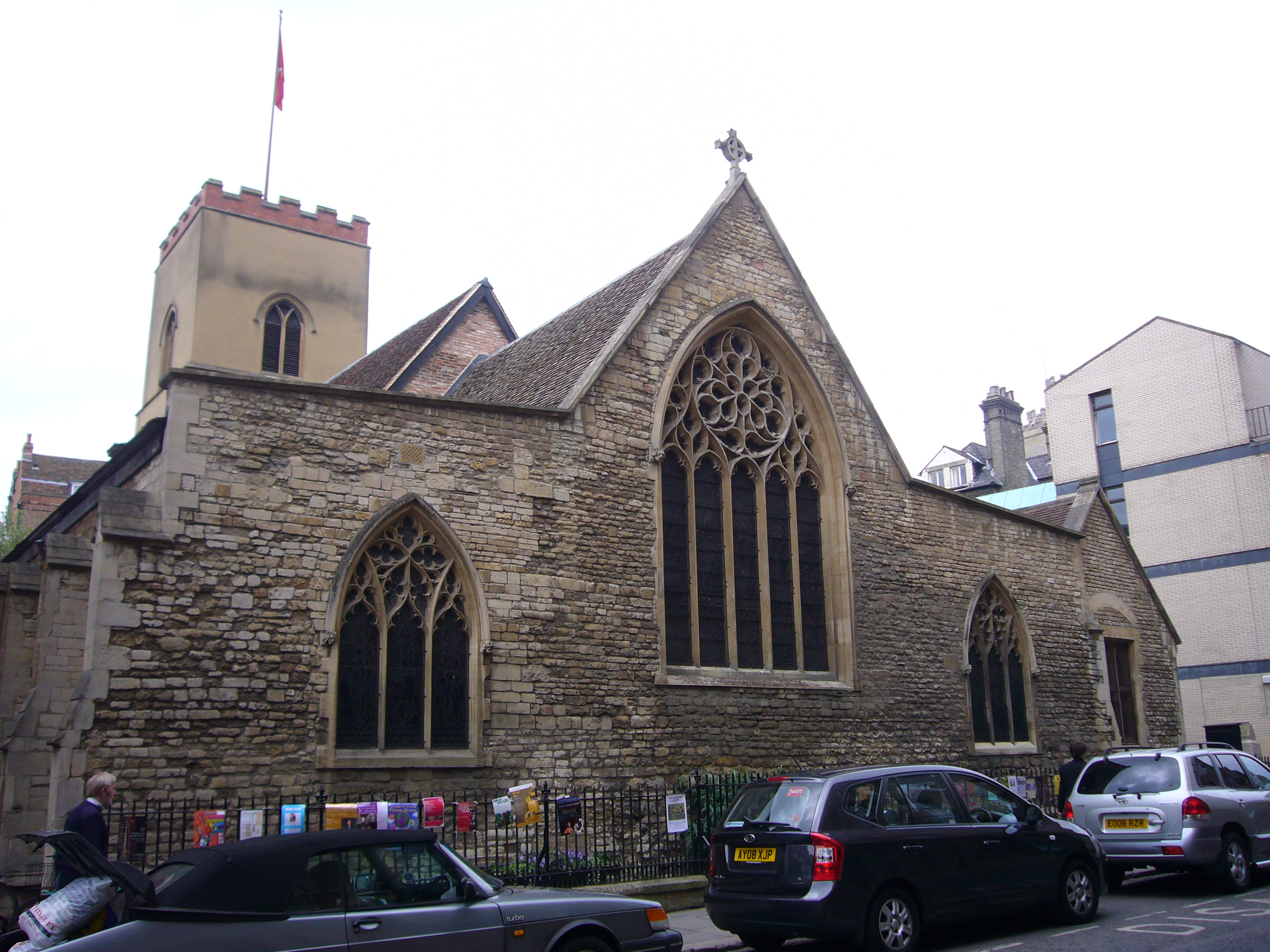
St Edward King and Martyr church on Peas Hill.

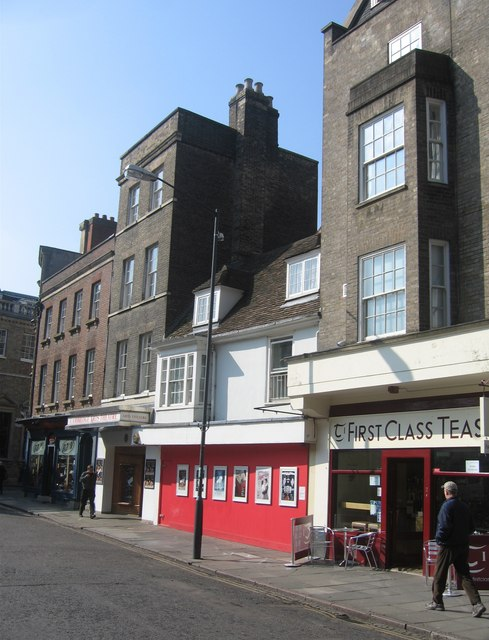
The Cambridge Arts Theatre on Peas Hill.

Peas Hill is a street in central Cambridge, England. It runs between Wheeler Street to the south and Market Hill to the north. King's Parade runs parallel with the street to the west. Guildhall Street runs parallel to the east.

The area is not strictly speaking a hill, being lower in elevation than some surrounding areas, but was once a slope down to the river upon which the city's main fish market stood. It is likely that its name is a corruption of the Latin pisces (fish) as there is no evidence that peas were ever exclusively grown or sold on the site.

St Edward King and Martyr church is on the west side of the street. The church is dedicated to Edward the Martyr, who was King of England from 975 until his murder in 978. It was at St Edward's in 1525 that what is said to have been the first sermon of the English Reformation took place. As such, the church is sometimes called the "Cradle of the Reformation".

Also on Peas Hill is the Cambridge Arts Theatre. This venue is used by the Cambridge Footlights amongst others.

The Cambridge Guildhall is to the east, on the corner with the Market Square. The building is used by the Cambridge City Council.

== See also ==
- St Edward's Passage
