= Hugh Latimer =

English bishop, Reformer, and martyr (c.1487–1555)

The Right Reverend Hugh Latimer
- Bishop of Worcester
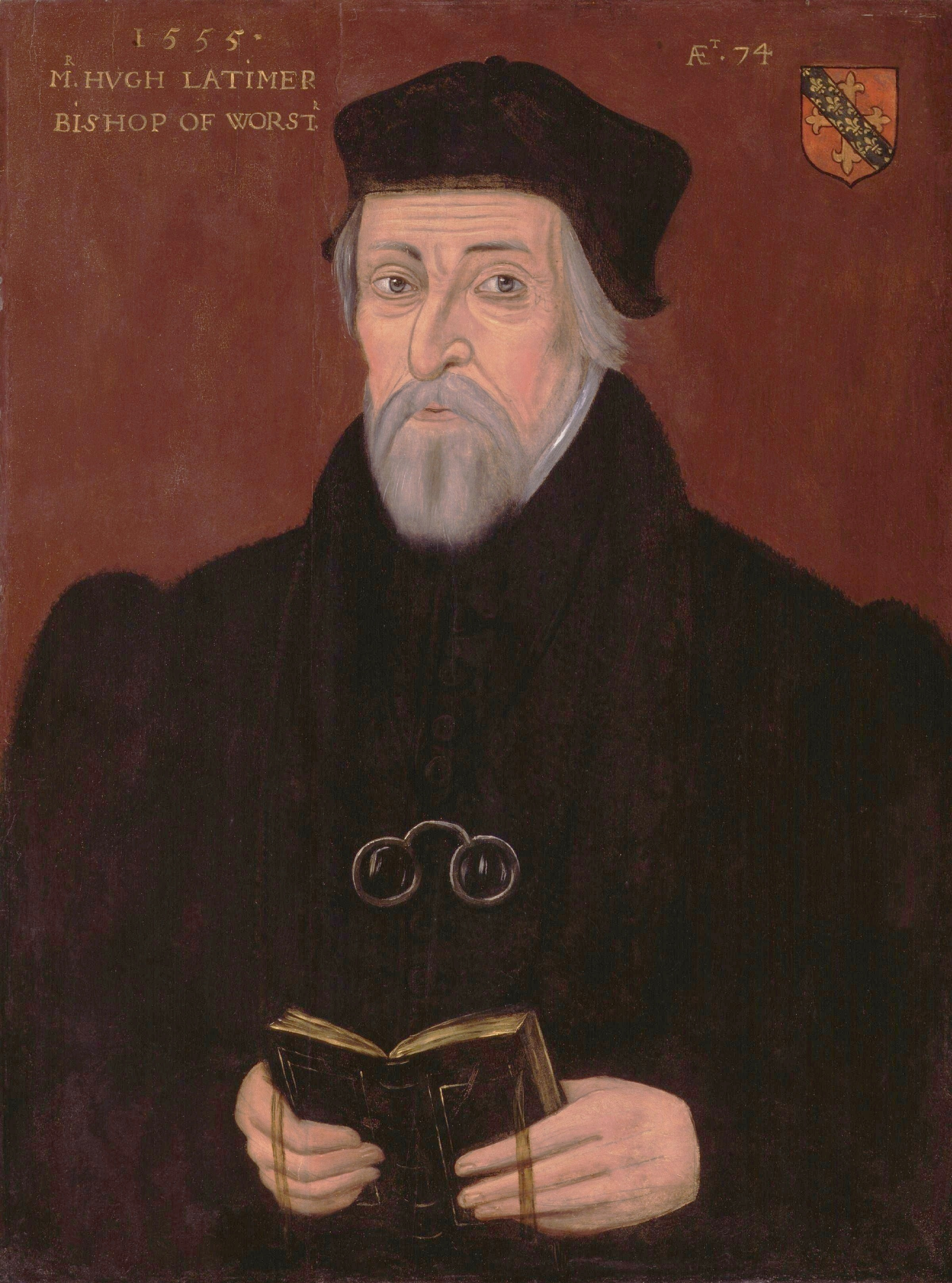
- Church: Church of England
- Diocese: Worcester
- In office: 1535–1539
- Predecessor: Girolamo Ghinucci
- Successor: John Bell
- Other post: Chaplain to the Royal Household

Orders
- Ordination: 15 July 1515
- Consecration: 1535

Personal details
- Born: 1487 Thurcaston, Leicestershire, Kingdom of England
- Died: 16 October 1555 (aged 67-68) Oxford, Oxfordshire, Kingdom of England
- Denomination: Anglicanism
- Education: University of Cambridge
- Alma mater: Peterhouse, Cambridge

Hugh Latimer (c. 1487 – 16 October 1555) was a Fellow of Clare College, Cambridge, and Bishop of Worcester during the Reformation, and later Church of England chaplain to King Edward VI. In 1555 under the Catholic Queen Mary I he was burned at the stake, becoming one of the three Oxford Martyrs of Anglicanism.

== Life ==
Latimer was born into a family of farmers in Thurcaston, Leicestershire. His birthdate is unknown. Contemporary biographers including John Foxe placed the date somewhere between 1480 and 1494. He later recalled that "my father...kept me to schole" and he started his studies in Latin grammar at the age of four, but not much else is known of his childhood. He attended the University of Cambridge from the age of 14, where according to the Alumni Cantabrigienses he was a pupil of John Watson and probably a scholar of Peterhouse. He was elected a fellow of Clare College on 2 February 1510, and in either that or the following year was awarded his Bachelor of Arts degree. He received a Master of Arts degree in April 1514 and was ordained a priest on 15 July 1515. In 1522, Latimer was nominated to the positions of university preacher and university chaplain. While carrying out his official duties, he continued with theological studies and received the Bachelor of Divinity degree in 1524. The subject of his disputation for the degree was a refutation of the new ideas of the Reformation emerging from the Continent, in particular the doctrines of Philipp Melanchthon. Up to this time, Latimer described himself as "obstinate a papist as any was in England". A recent convert to the new teachings, Thomas Bilney heard his disputation and later came to him to give his confession. Bilney's words had a great impact on Latimer and from that day forward he accepted the reformed doctrines.

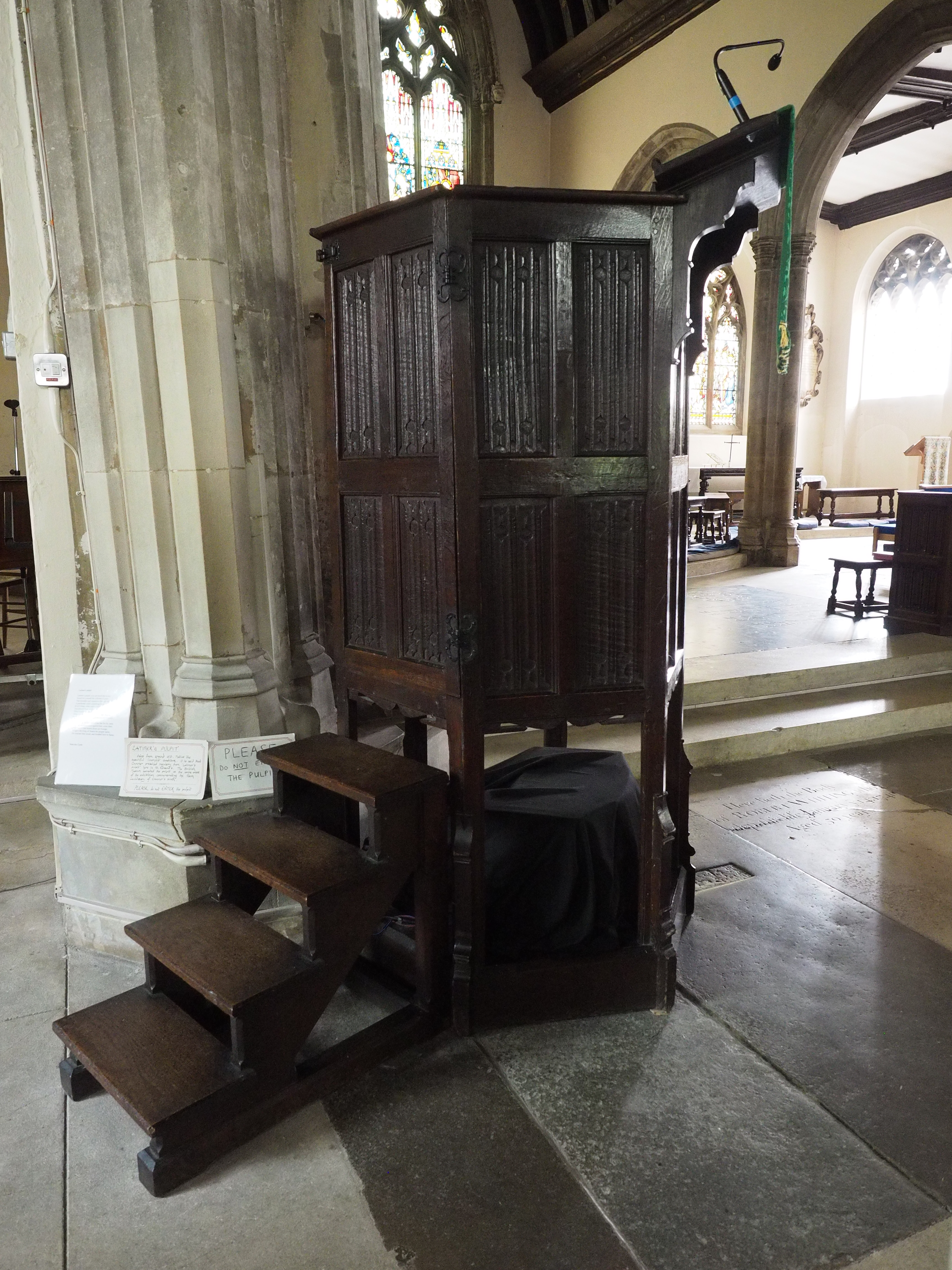
The pulpit from which Latimer preached in St Edward's Church, Cambridge

Latimer joined a group of reformers including Bilney and Robert Barnes that met regularly at the White Horse Tavern. He began to preach publicly on the need for the translation of the Bible into English. This was a dangerous move as the first translation of the New Testament by William Tyndale had recently been banned. In early 1528, Latimer was called before Cardinal Thomas Wolsey and he was given an admonition and a warning. The following year, Wolsey fell from Henry VIII's favour when he failed to expedite the annulment of Henry's marriage to Catherine of Aragon. In contrast, Latimer's reputation was in the ascendant as he took the lead among the reformers in Cambridge. During Advent in 1529, he preached his two "Sermons on the Card" at St Edward's Church.

In 1535 he was appointed Bishop of Worcester, in succession to an Italian absentee, and promoted reformed teachings and iconoclasm in his diocese. On 22 May 1538, at the insistence of Cromwell, he preached the final sermon before Franciscan Friar John Forest was burnt at the stake, in a fire said to have been fuelled partly by a Welsh image of Saint Derfel. In 1539, he opposed Henry VIII's Six Articles, with the result that he was forced to resign his bishopric and imprisoned in the Tower of London (where he was again in 1546).

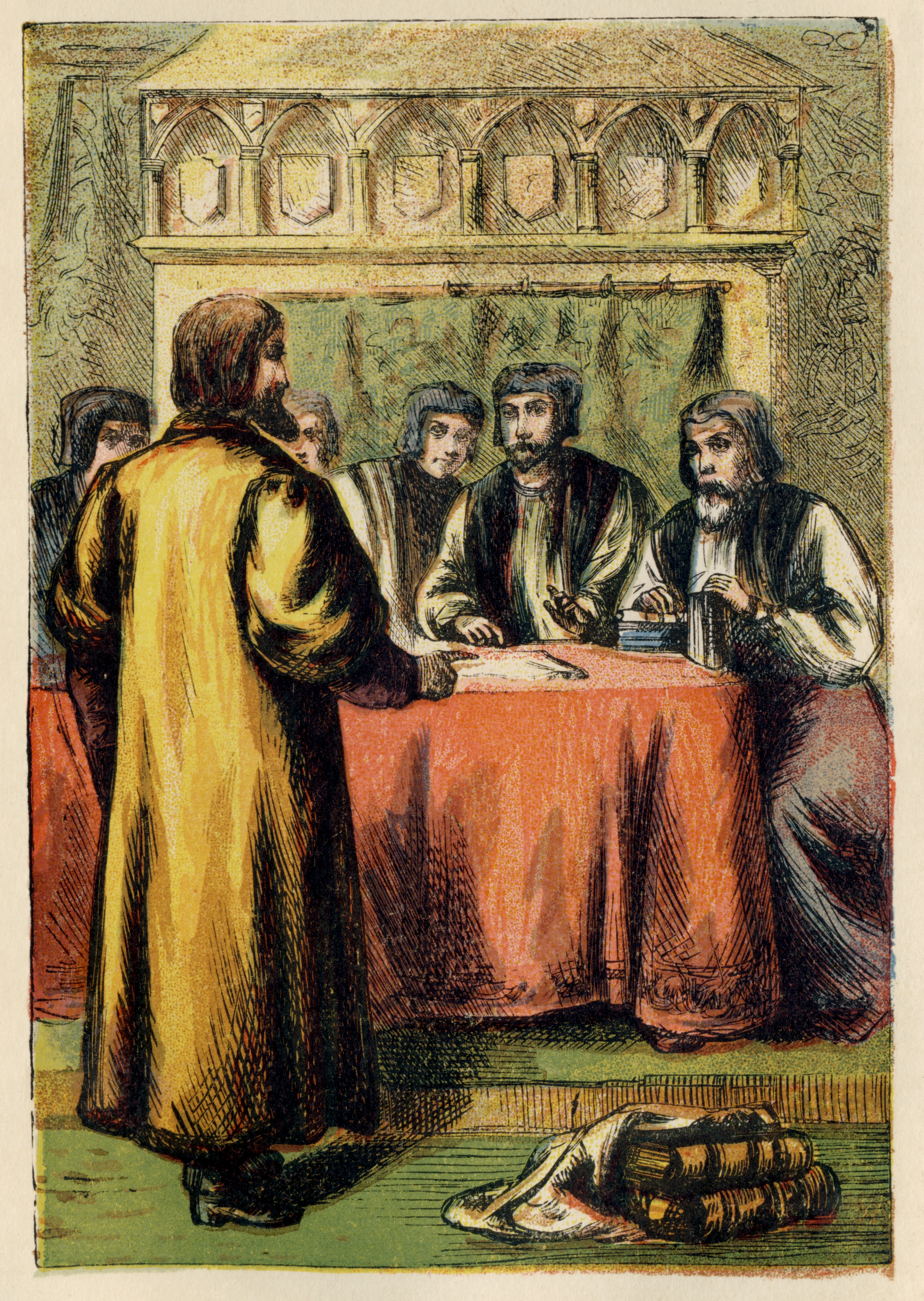
"Latimer before the Council", from an 1887 edition of Foxe's Book of Martyrs, illustrated by Kronheim.

He then served as chaplain to Katherine Duchess of Suffolk. However, when Edward VI's sister Mary I came to the throne, he was tried for his beliefs and teachings in Oxford and imprisoned. In October 1555 he was burned at the stake outside Balliol College, Oxford.

== Trial ==
On 14 April 1554, commissioners from the papal party (including Edmund Bonner and Stephen Gardiner) began an examination of Latimer, Ridley, and Cranmer. Latimer, hardly able to sustain a debate at his age, responded to the council in writing. He argued that the doctrines of the corporeal real presence of Christ in the mass, transubstantiation, and the propitiatory merit of the mass were unbiblical. The commissioners tried to demonstrate that Latimer did not share the same faith as eminent Fathers, to which Latimer replied, "I am of their faith when they say well... I have said, when they say well, and bring Scripture for them, I am of their faith; and further Augustine requireth not to be believed."

Latimer believed that the welfare of souls demanded he stand for the Protestant understanding of the gospel. The commissioners also understood that the debate involved the very message of salvation itself, by which souls would be saved or damned:

After the sentence had been pronounced, Latimer added, 'I thank God most heartily that He hath prolonged my life to this end, that I may in this case glorify God by that kind of death'; to which the prolocutor replied, 'If you go to heaven in this faith, then I will never come hither, as I am thus persuaded.'

== Death ==
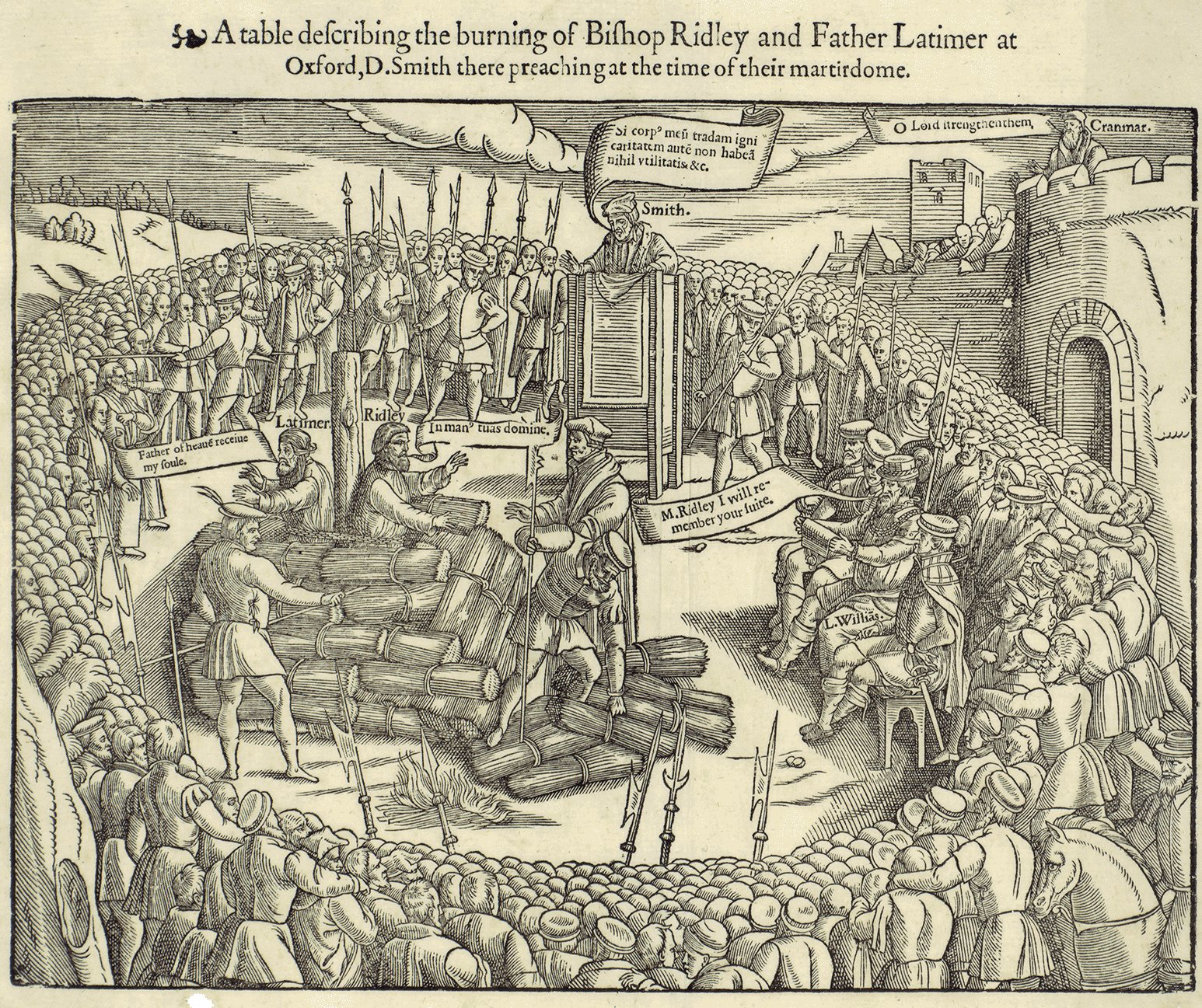
The burning of Hugh Latimer and Nicholas Ridley, from John Foxe's Book of Martyrs (1563)

Latimer was burned at the stake along with Nicholas Ridley. He is quoted as having said to Ridley:

Play the man, Master Ridley; we shall this day light such a candle, by God's grace, in England, as I trust shall never be put out.

The deaths of Latimer, Ridley and later Cranmer – now known as the Oxford Martyrs – are commemorated in Oxford by the Victorian-era Martyrs' Memorial near the actual execution site, which is marked by a cross in Broad Street, formerly the ditch outside the city's North Gate.

== Commemoration ==
Latimer and Nicholas Ridley are honoured with a commemoration on 16 October by the Church of England, the American Episcopal Church and the Anglican Church of Canada. The Latimer room in Clare College, Cambridge is named after him, as is Latimer Square in central Christchurch, New Zealand.

== See also ==
- John Foxe
- John Knox
- Marian Persecutions

== Notes ==
Church of England titles
| Preceded by Girolamo Ghinucci | Bishop of Worcester; 1535–1539 | Succeeded by John Bell |
