= Cambridge Arts Theatre =

Theatre in Cambridge, England

The Arts Theatre Cambridge
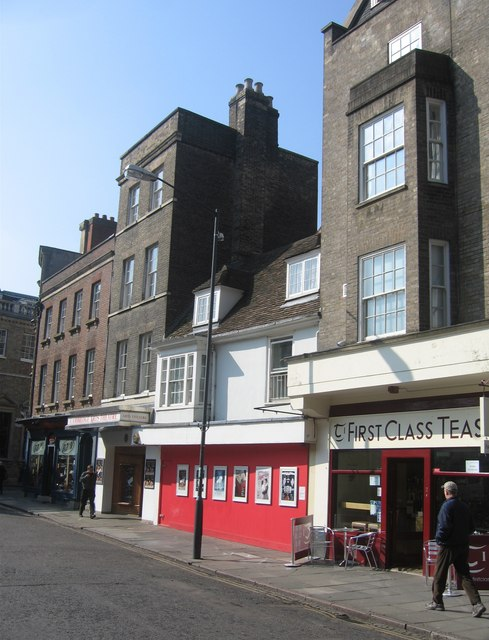
- Interactive map of The Arts Theatre Cambridge
- Address: 6 St Edward's Passage; Cambridge, England; United Kingdom
- Coordinates: 52.204300°N 0.118424°E
- Capacity: 664

Construction
- Opened: 1 February 1936
- Reopened: 27 November 2025

Website
- artstheatre.co.uk

The Arts Theatre Cambridge is a 664-seat theatre on Peas Hill and St Edward's Passage in central Cambridge, England. The theatre presents a varied mix of drama, dance, opera and pantomime. It attracts touring productions, as well as many shows direct from, or prior to, seasons in the West End. Its annual Christmas pantomime is an established tradition in the city. From 1969 to 1985, the theatre was also home to the Cambridge Theatre Company, a national touring company. The Arts Theatre Cambridge was founded in 1936 by the Cambridge economist and statesman John Maynard Keynes.

The Arts Theatre Cambridge has also been home to performances of Cambridge University's Marlowe Society, and it provides a venue for the university's triennial Cambridge Greek Play performed in Ancient Greek. In previous years it also housed performances by Footlights, the Cambridge University Gilbert & Sullivan Society and the Cambridge University Musical Theatre Society.

In November 2026, it was announced that Tom Littler, artistic director at the Orange Tree Theatre, Richmond, London, would be stepping down from his role to take up the post of chief executive and artistic director at the Cambridge Arts Theatre in June 2027.

== History ==
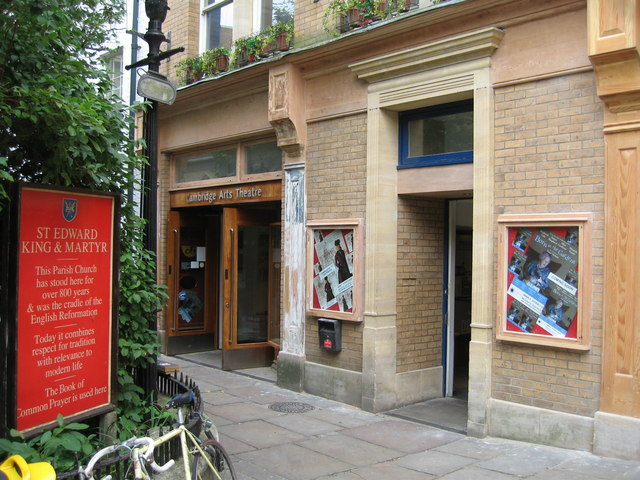
Side entrance on St Edward's Passage

The Arts Theatre Cambridge opened on 3 February 1936 with a gala performance by the Vic-Wells Ballet, featuring among others Robert Helpmann, Margot Fonteyn and Frederick Ashton.

ON Monday night, the Vic-Wells Ballet Company made a flying visit to appear at the opening performance of the new Cambridge Arts Theatre, which has been built to provide the town with plays, films, ballet, and music. The theatre has been completely equipped by the Strand Electric and Engineering Company. Any kind of stage play or revue can be presented. The whole of the apparatus is controlled by a modern stage lighting switchboard, unique in design. It is portable, and can be removed when the apron front stage used. The two battens are of magazine type, the first being divided into sections with Strand’s electric 1,000- watt spot lanterns fitted between the sections. The second is of similar design to throw light downwards, and has an angle dispersion of twenty-four degrees. A complete movable flat canvas cyclorama is being installed, and this is illuminated by the Strand Electric three-colour process—at the top, by fourteen 1,000-watt Cyclorama Lanterns, which give a beam angle of 105 degrees, and at the bottom by the Cyclorama Ground Row, which has been let into a permanent pit below the stage level, for horizon lighting. The front and fore-stage lighting is provided by means of a specially designed spot-box concealed in the ceiling, and in numerous openings at either side of the theatre adjacent to the boxes. The usual system of signals, stage floods, wing floods, perch arc lamps, etc., have also been installed. Altogether, this is one of the best and most efficiently equipped theatres in the country.

The theatre was paid for by a share scheme supervised by its founder John Maynard Keynes, at a cost of £15,000. When only £2,300 was raised by subscription of the town, Dr Keynes underwrote the rest himself. Intending to represent both "town and gown", the Trust included the Provost of King's College, its English and Music professors, the mayor and the deputy mayor. Keynes' wife, the renowned dancer Lydia Lopokova was also key to the theatre's foundation. The first manager was Norman Higgins.

CAMBRIDGE Arts Theatre (M.N. Openshaw Higgins). A London company are presenting a season of Ibsen at this theatre, which opened on Monday night, and will continue until Saturday, February 29. The plays selected are A Doll's House, Rosmersholm, Hedda Gabler, and The Master Builder. The company include Lydia Lopokova and Jean Forbes-Robertson who share the leading female roles and on Monday Lydia Lopokova gave a fine rendering of the part of Nora. She was capably supported by Geoffrey Edwards as Torvald; and the Dr. Rank of A. Clarke-Smith was a most effective study. Betty Hardy and Wilfrid Grantham as Mrs. Linden and Nils Krogstad were outstanding for consistent good work, and the smaller parts were capably sustained. The play was produced by Michael Orme and the costumes of the period and the scenery were by Motley. Yesterday (Wednesday) Rosmersholwas presented, with Jean Forbes- Robertson as Rebecca West, and John Laurie in the part of Johannes Rosmer. Irene Hentschel produced the play.

Dadie Rylands went on to be the theatre's chairman from 1946 to 1982. A year later, in 1947, the theatre began hosting the Cambridge Arts Theatre Summer Festival, for which Benjamin Britten personally conducted the English Opera Group in a production of his comic opera Albert Herring in 1948.

The theatre hosted the world première of Harold Pinter's The Birthday Party in 1958. Other premières have included Secrets Every Smart Traveler Should Know and Someone Like You. In September 2008 it hosted the world premiere of a new stage adaptation of Tracy Chevalier's play Girl with a Pearl Earring, prior to a transfer to the West End. Artists to have appeared here include Ian McKellen (in a Marlowe Society production of Cymbeline), Derek Jacobi, and, more recently Susan Hampshire, Nigel Havers, Simon Callow, and Warren Mitchell.

In 2013 the front of house and bar facilities were remodelled and an extra entrance created. This work was awarded to Burrell Foley Fischer and the work commended in the sustainability category of the 2014 Cambridge Design and Construction awards.

The theatre closed temporarily in 2025 for refurbishment of the theatre's auditorium and backstage spaces with funding from the Gatsby Charitable Foundation.

== Cambridge Theatre Company ==
The Cambridge Arts Theatre was home to the Cambridge Theatre Company (established in 1969). Formed as a sister company to Toby Robertson's Prospect Theatre Company and Ian McKellen's Actors' Company (presented as part of CTC), the Cambridge Theatre Company enjoyed enormous loyalty in its home town, and many excellent emerging actors were featured in its wide repertoire.

Under Jonathan Lynn (1976–1981) many of the company's productions transferred to the West End. Lynn, a 1963 Cambridge graduate along with John Cleese and others in the Footlights, used his many contacts to build up a successful repertoire of quality drama. He commissioned plays from Frederic Raphael (After the Greek) and Royce Ryton (The Unvarnished Truth with Tim Brooke Taylor and Graeme Garden), and his production of Songbook, a spoof musical by Julian More and Monty Norman, transferred to London in 1978.

Like the Prospect Theatre Company and the Actors' Company, CTC initially operated a repertory system of a company of around 14 actors. For example, the 1974 six-play season featured Zoë Wanamaker, Oliver Ford Davies, Roger Rees and Ian Charleson. Sheila Hancock was a regular under Lynn, becoming Associate Director. Maureen Lipman starred in her husband Jack Rosenthal's play Smash! based on the ill-fated West End musical Bar Mitzvah Boy, itself based on the smash hit 1976 television play of the same name in which Lynn and Lipman had featured.

During the 1970s and early 1980s a primary function of the Cambridge Theatre Company, along with the Oxford Playhouse Company, was to provide middle-scale theatres such as in Harlow, Swindon, Darlington, Mold, Southampton, Croydon, Peterborough, Cardiff, and Stirling with good quality touring drama. The company's Arts Council of Great Britain grant was dependent on this.

The directors of the company were Richard Cottrell (1969–1975), Robert Lang (1975–1976), Jonathan Lynn (1976–1981), Bill Pryde (1981–1988), Robin Midgley (1988–1991), and Mike Alfreds (1991–1999). The company's headquarters were moved to London and its name was changed to "Method and Madness" in 1995. In 1999 the company dissolved in the face of declining interest in quality drama in the provinces.
