= King's Parade =

Street in Cambridge, England

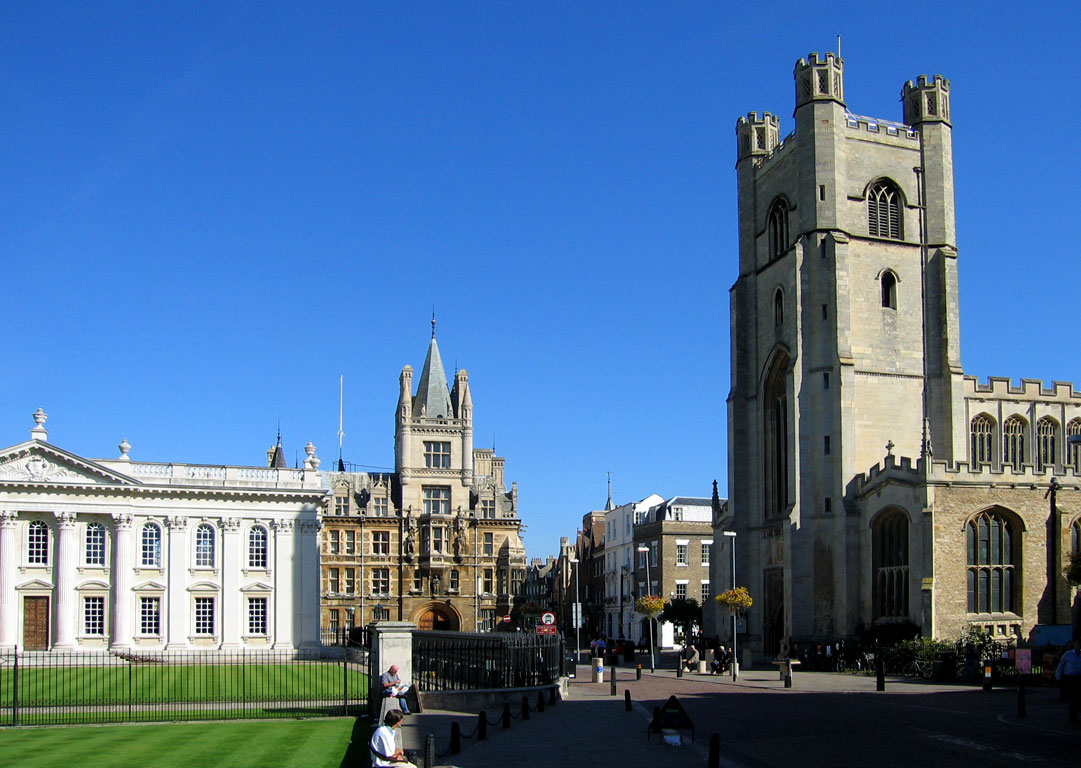
- Looking north along King's Parade to the Senate House (left) and Great St Mary's church (right), 2004
- Interactive map of King's Parade
- Former name: High Street
- Location: Cambridge, United Kingdom
- Postal code: CB2
- Coordinates: 52.2046°N 0.1177°E
- North end: Trinity Street
- South end: Trumpington Street

King's Parade is a street in central Cambridge, England. The street continues north as Trinity Street and then St John's Street, and south as Trumpington Street. It is a major tourist area in Cambridge, commanding a central position in the University of Cambridge area of the city. It is also a place frequented by many cyclists and by students travelling between lectures during term-time.

King's College is located on the west side of the street, hence the name, and dominates the scene with the east end of its large Chapel on view. Also on the street, just to the north, is the University of Cambridge Senate House, mainly used for degree ceremonies. This area is known as Senate House Hill. Opposite the Senate House is Great St Mary's, the historic University Church.

== History ==
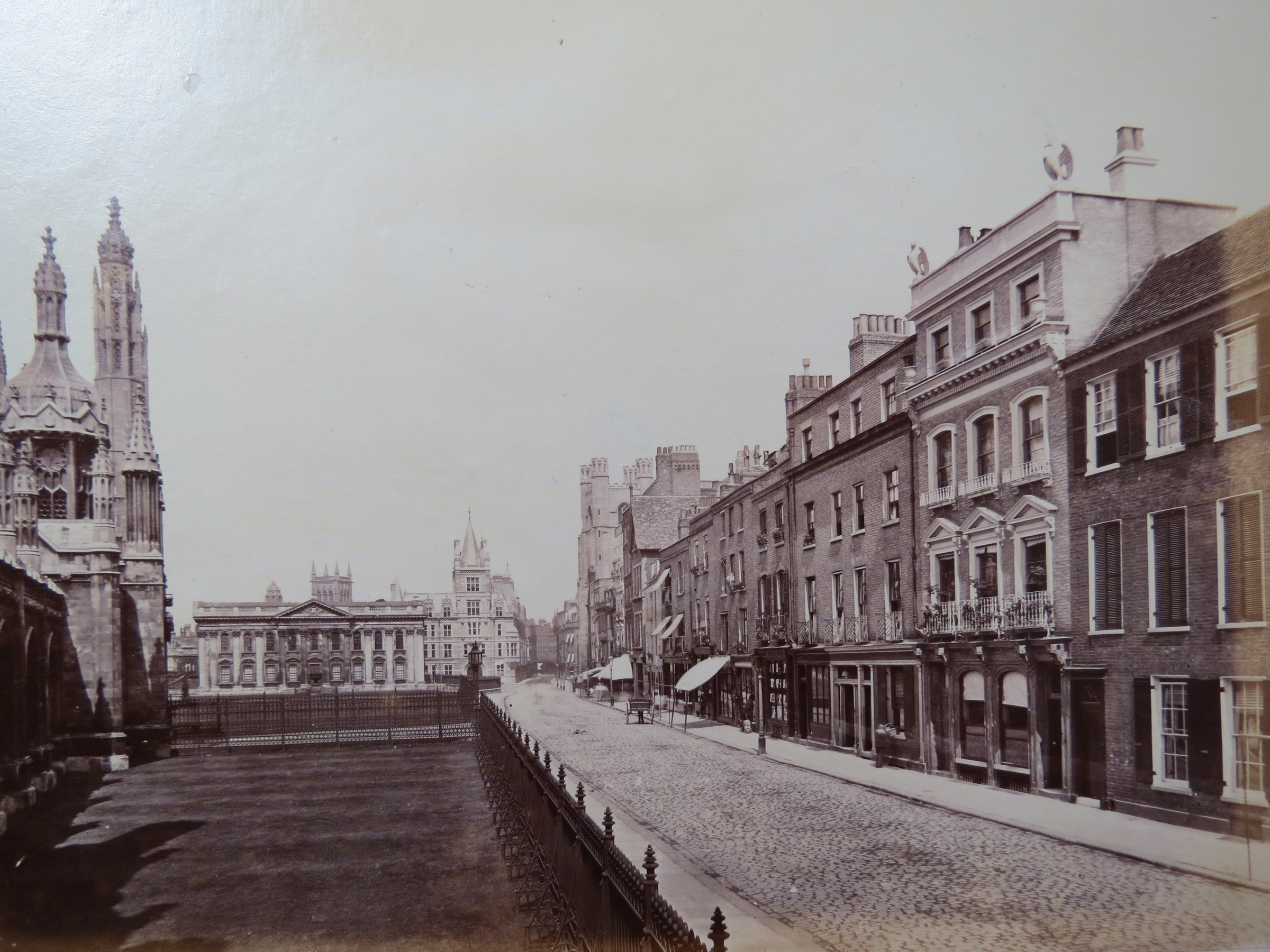
Photograph of King's Parade circa 1870, showing shops on the east side

The White Horse Tavern, on King's Lane to the west of King's Parade, was a 16th-century meeting place for English Protestant reformers to discuss Lutheran ideas, from as early as 1521. When the King's College screen was extended in 1870, the tavern was demolished. There is now a blue plaque in the college's Chetwynd Court to commemorate this.

Bowes & Bowes was a bookseller and publishing company located at 1 Trinity Street (at the south end of the street), a corner position at the junction with King's Parade and St Mary's Street to the east. It has a claim to be the oldest bookshop in the United Kingdom, with books having been sold on the site since 1581. The Bowes & Bowes shop closed in 1986 and subsequently Sherratt & Hughes closed in 1992, since when the site has become the Cambridge University Press bookshop.

When the King's College Gatehouse (porters' lodge) and Screen were built in the 1830s, the previous west side of the street was completely demolished. Opposite King's College is a row of now mainly touristic shops. For example, the Primavera Gallery and gift store is located here. St Mary's Passage and St Edward's Passage lead away from King's Parade to the east.

No.1 King's Parade on the corner or King's Parade and Bene't Street was a milliner and dressmaker by the name of C.H. Lawrence in the early 20th century. In the 1950s and 1960s the building became Millers Wine Parlour. In Ted Hughes: The Life of A Poet by Elaine Feinstein, Sylvia Plath is described sitting in Millers Wine parlour in 1956, reading a review article. Since then it has occupied various establishments, including the wine bars Gough Bros (1972) and Shades (1972–1992), The English Teddy Bear Company (late 1990s–early 2000s) and a restaurant/bar by the name of No.1 King's Parade (until 2006). Today a restaurant called The Cambridge Chop House is located here.

In the 1970s, Chris Curry rented offices at 6 King's Parade to establish Sinclair Instrument Ltd with Sir Clive Sinclair. In 1977, the company was renamed to Science of Cambridge Ltd. The name Sinclair Research Ltd was adopted in 1981. The company was important in the home computer revolution of the early 1980s in the UK.

At the southern end of King's Parade, on the corner of Corpus Christi College in Trumpington Street, is the Corpus Clock, a new piece of art installed in 2008 that has also become a significant tourist attraction.

== Panoramic view ==
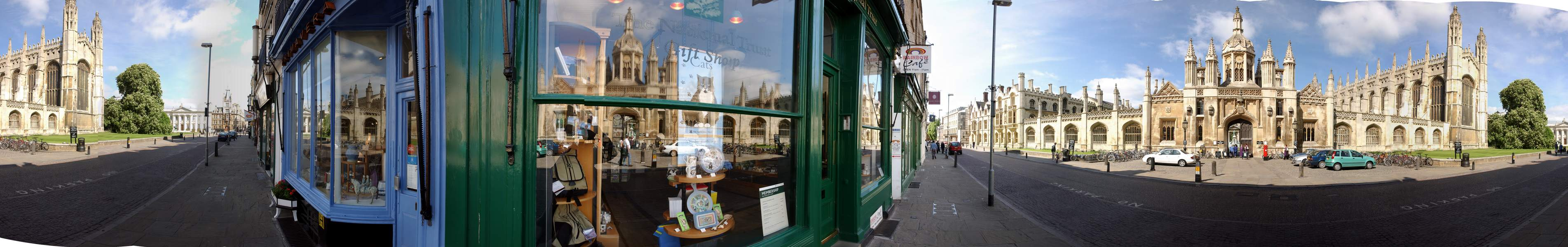
Panoramic view of King's Parade, 2007

== Image gallery ==
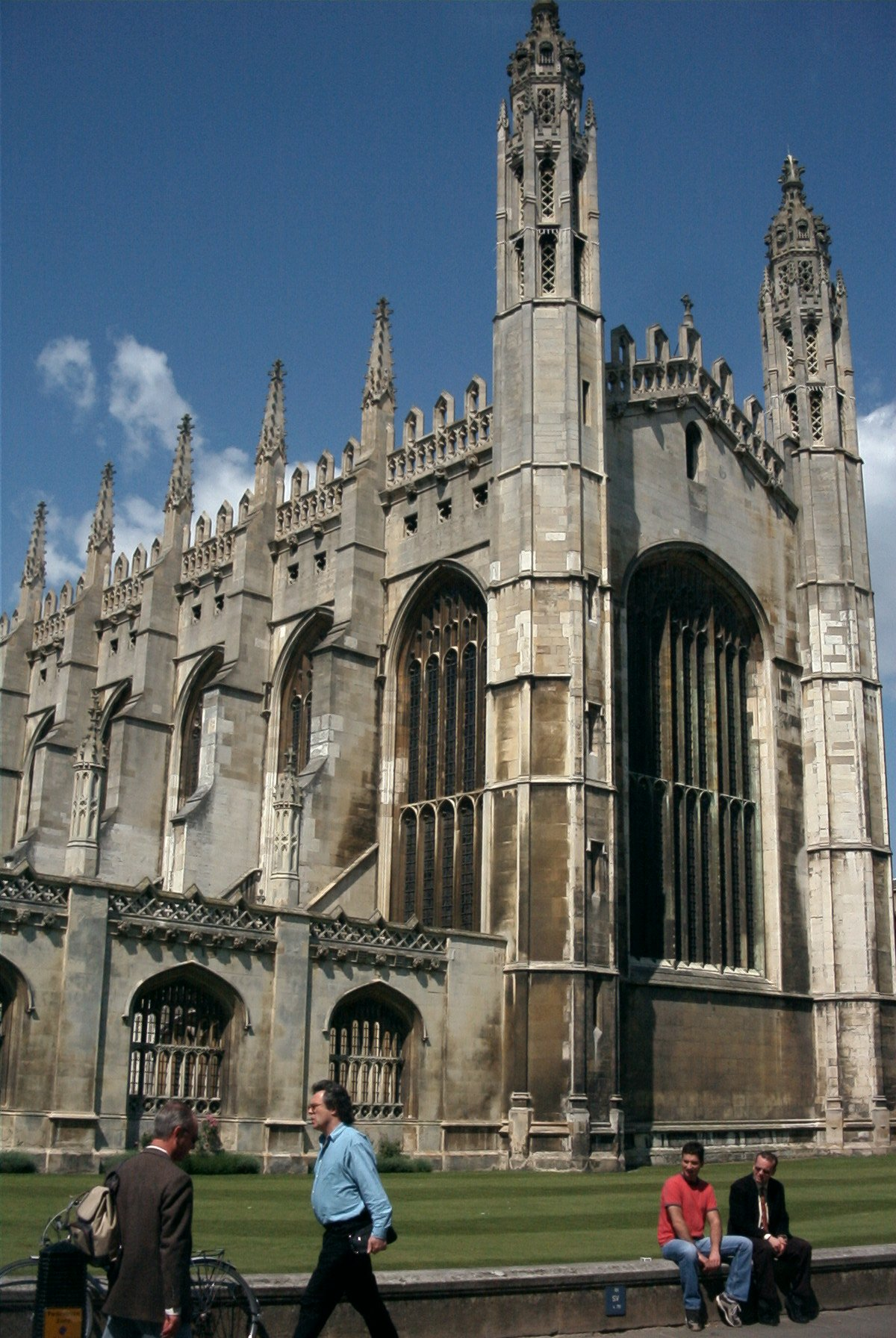
King's College Chapel from King's Parade.

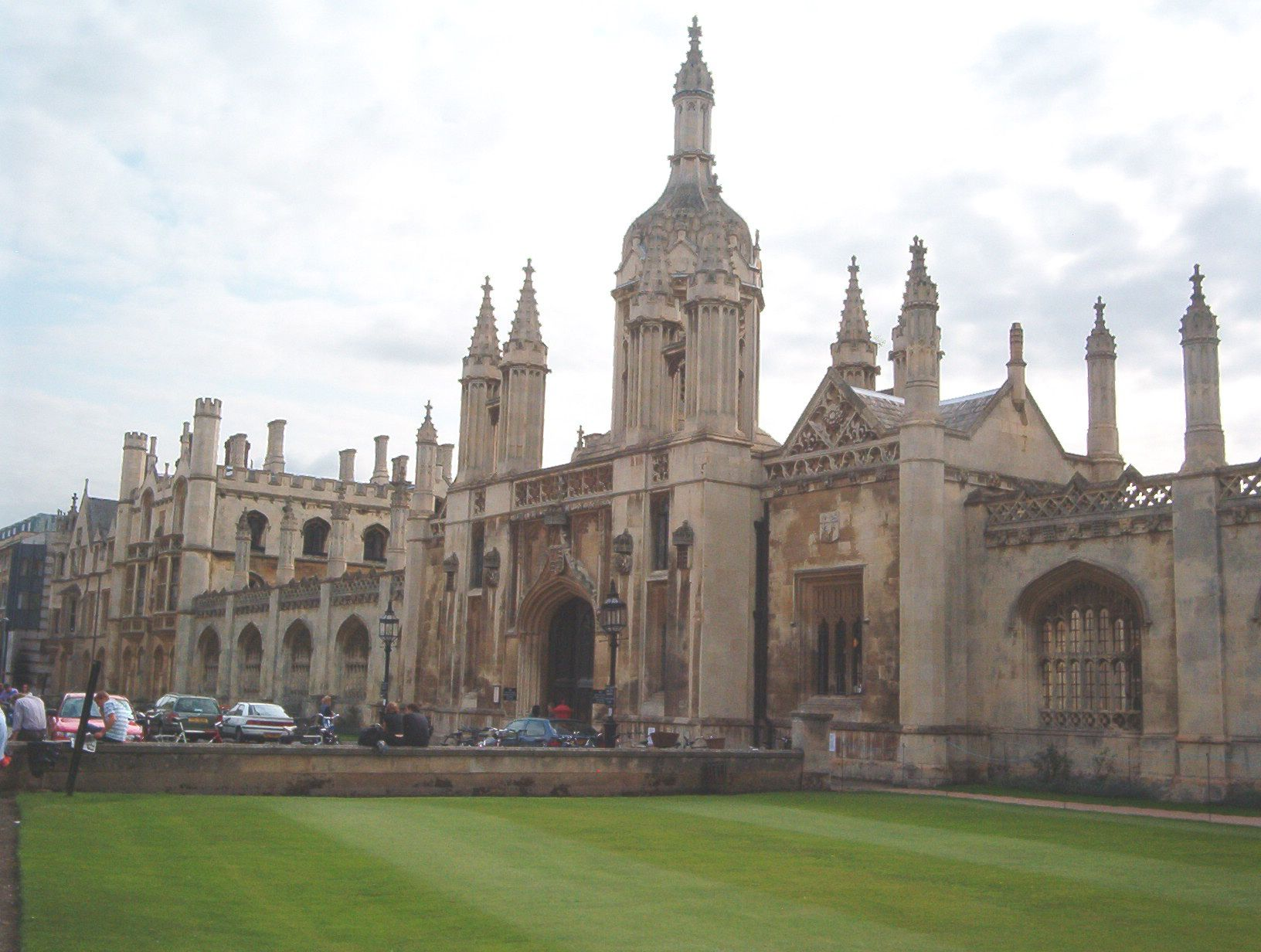
The King's College Gatehouse, built in the neo-Gothic style, as seen from King's Parade.

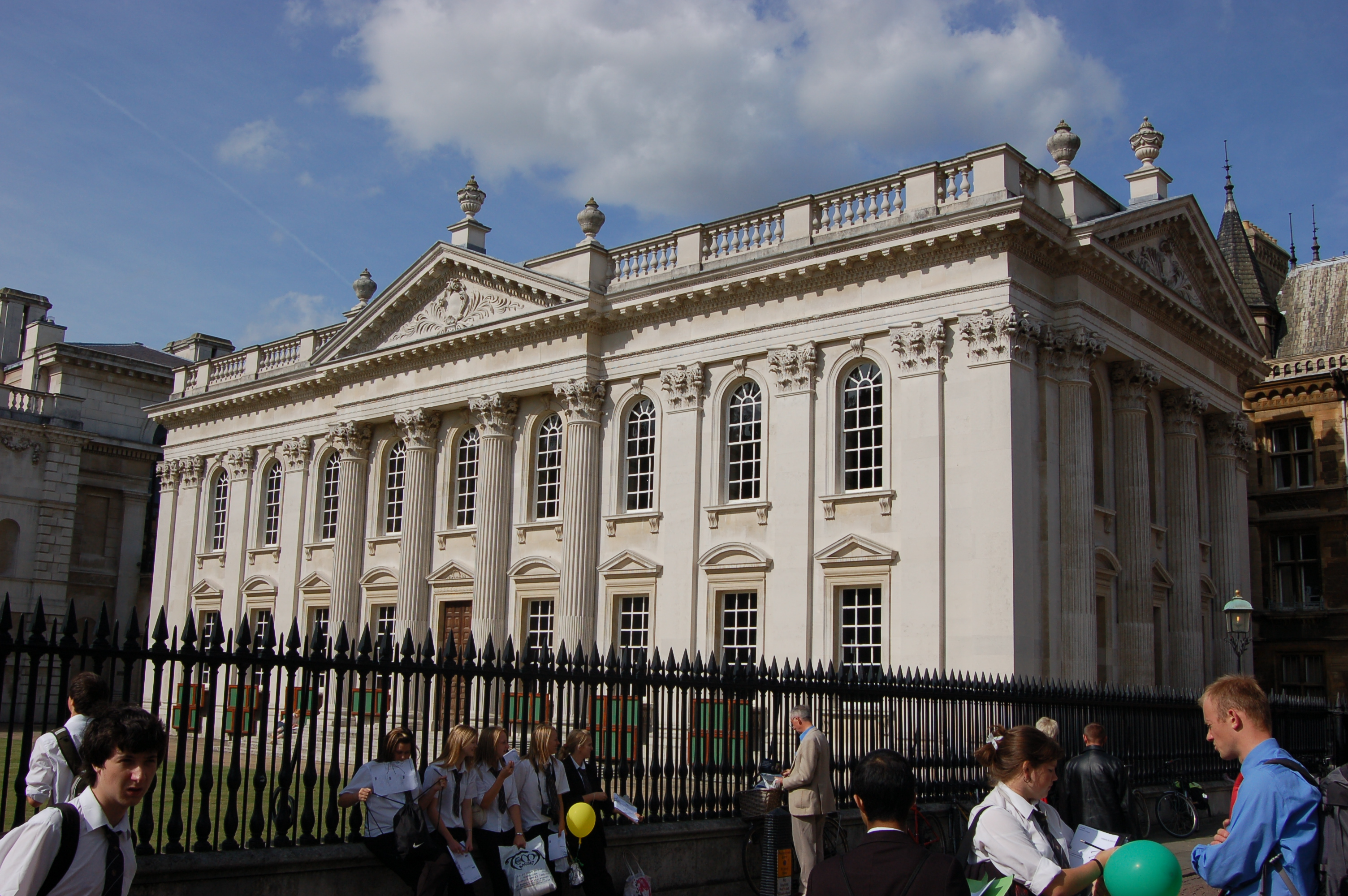
The Senate House viewed from King's Parade.

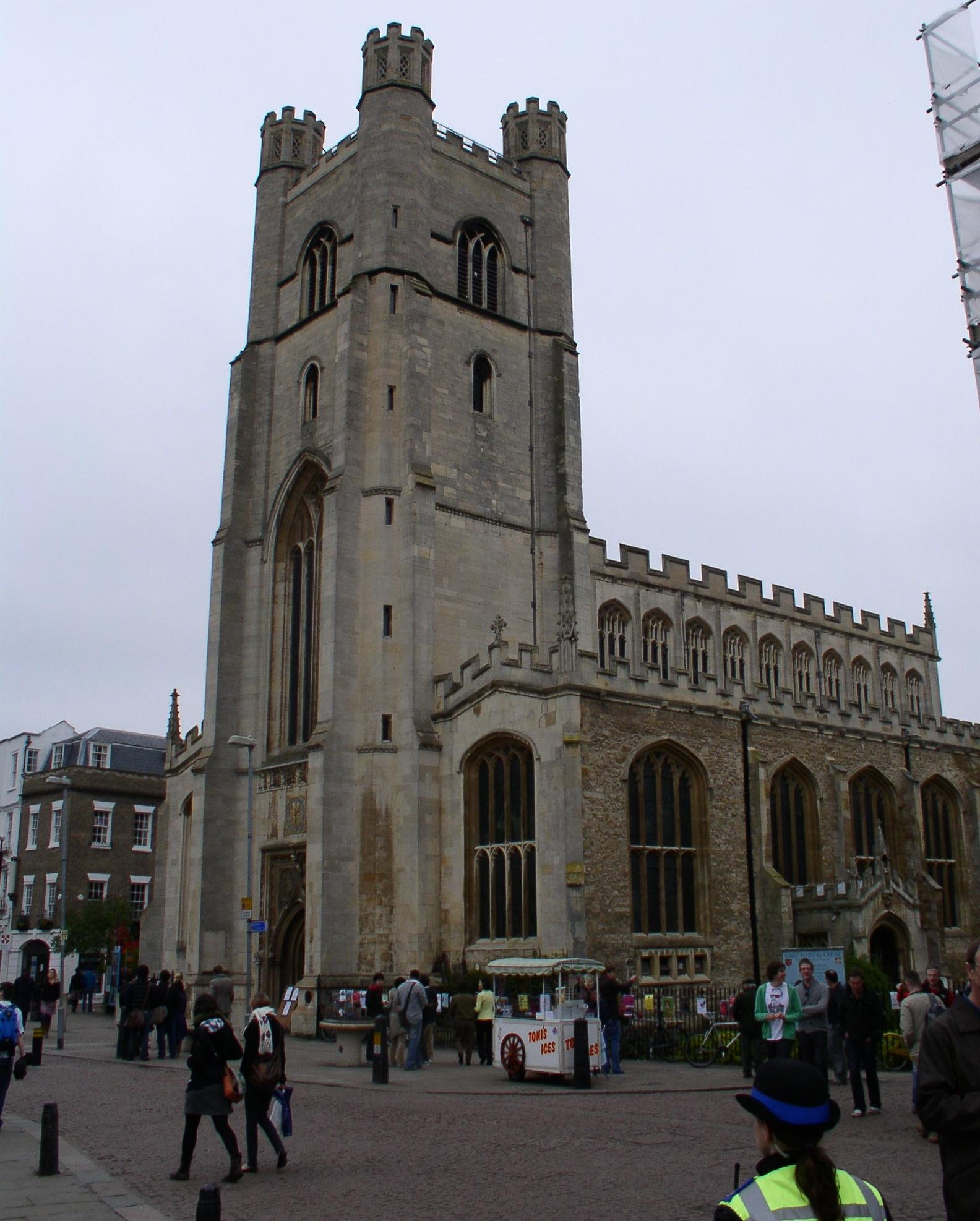
Great St Mary's, the University Church, opposite the Senate House on King's Parade.

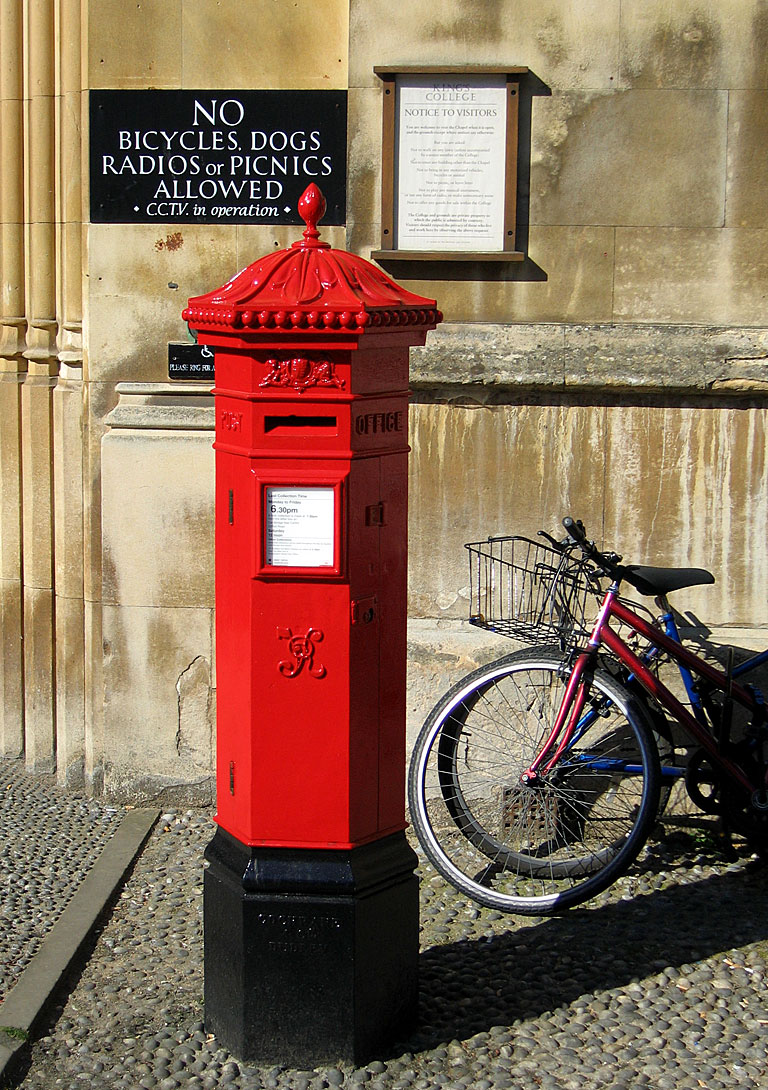
A Victorian pillar box by the main gate of King's College on King's Parade.

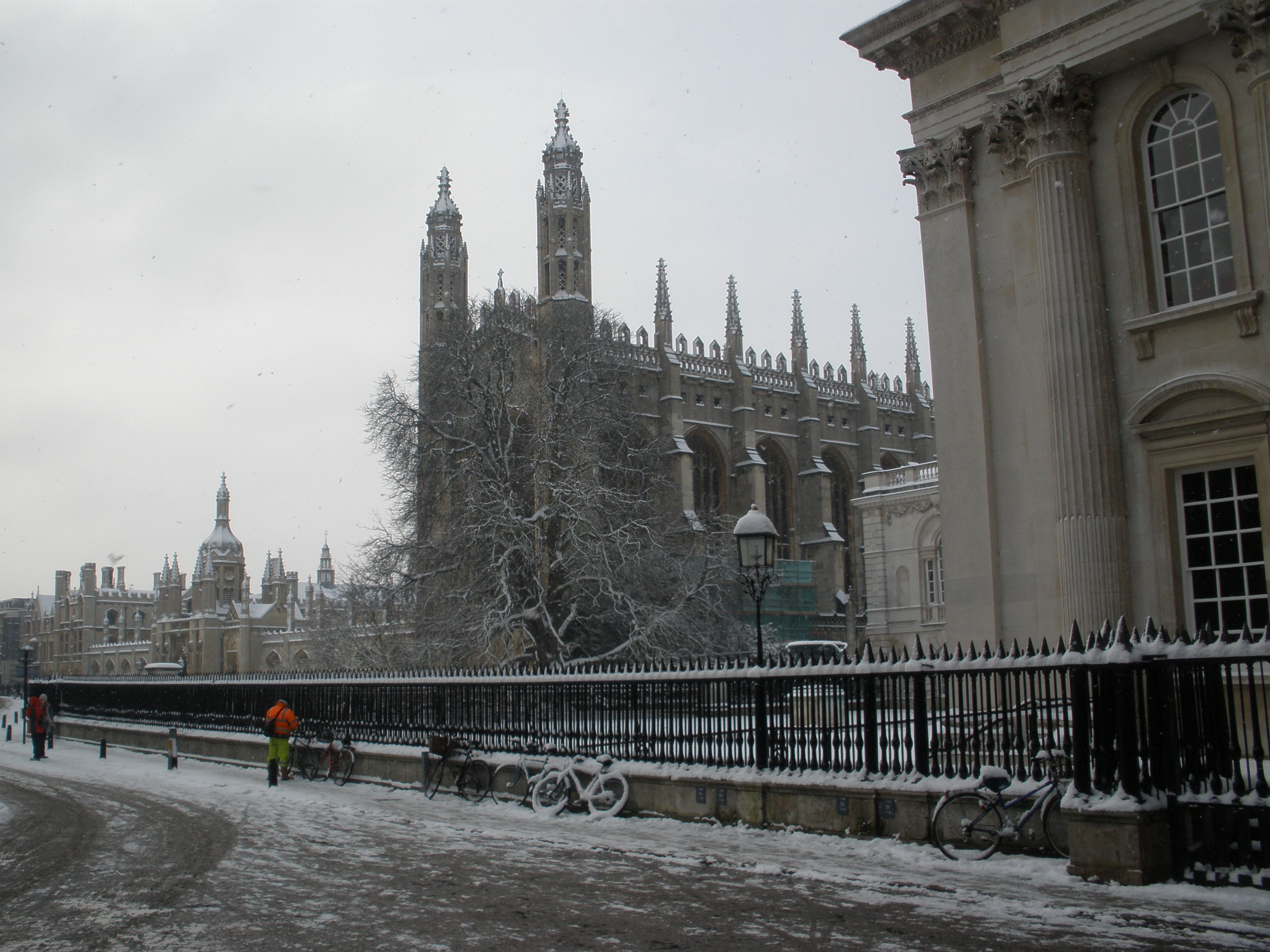
King's College Chapel in the snow from the north of King's Parade.

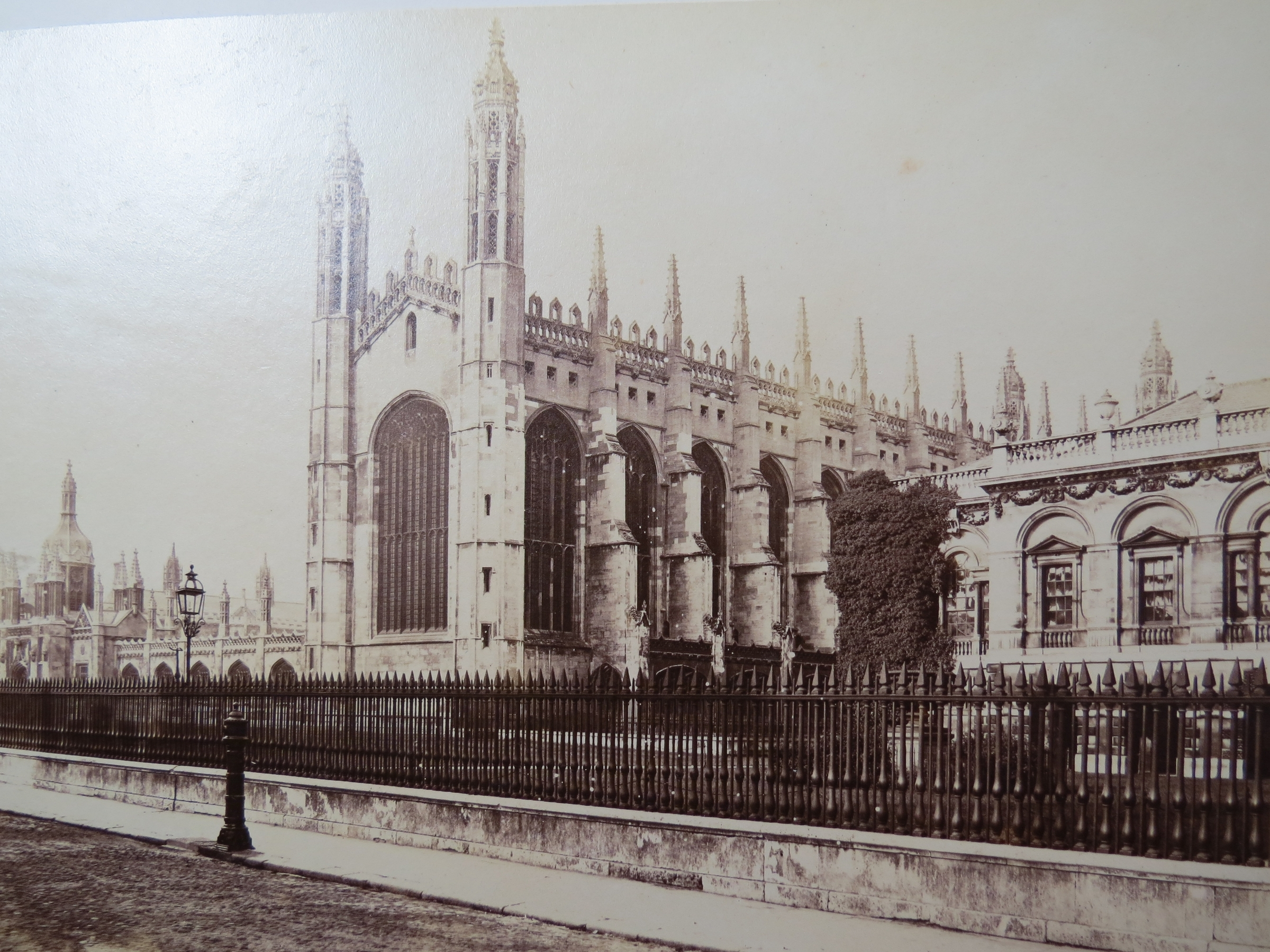
Historical photograph of the same scene.

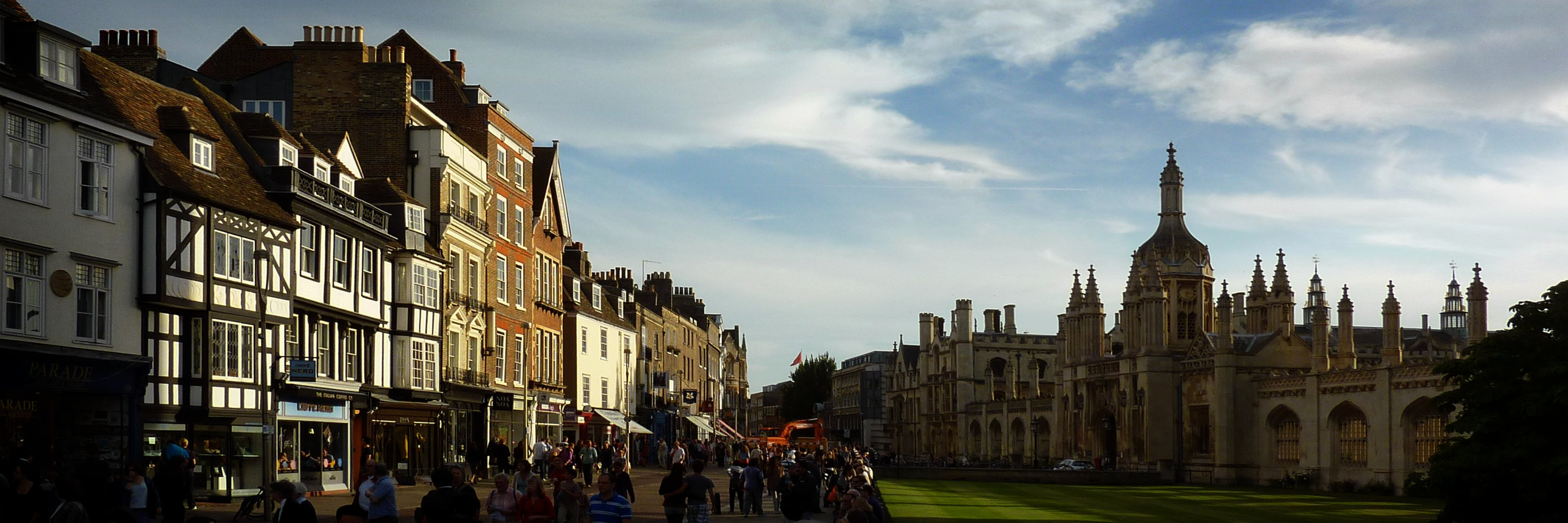
View of King's Parade looking south from the Senate House.
