= Robert Barnes (martyr) =

Martyr in the English Reformation (c. 1495 – 1540)

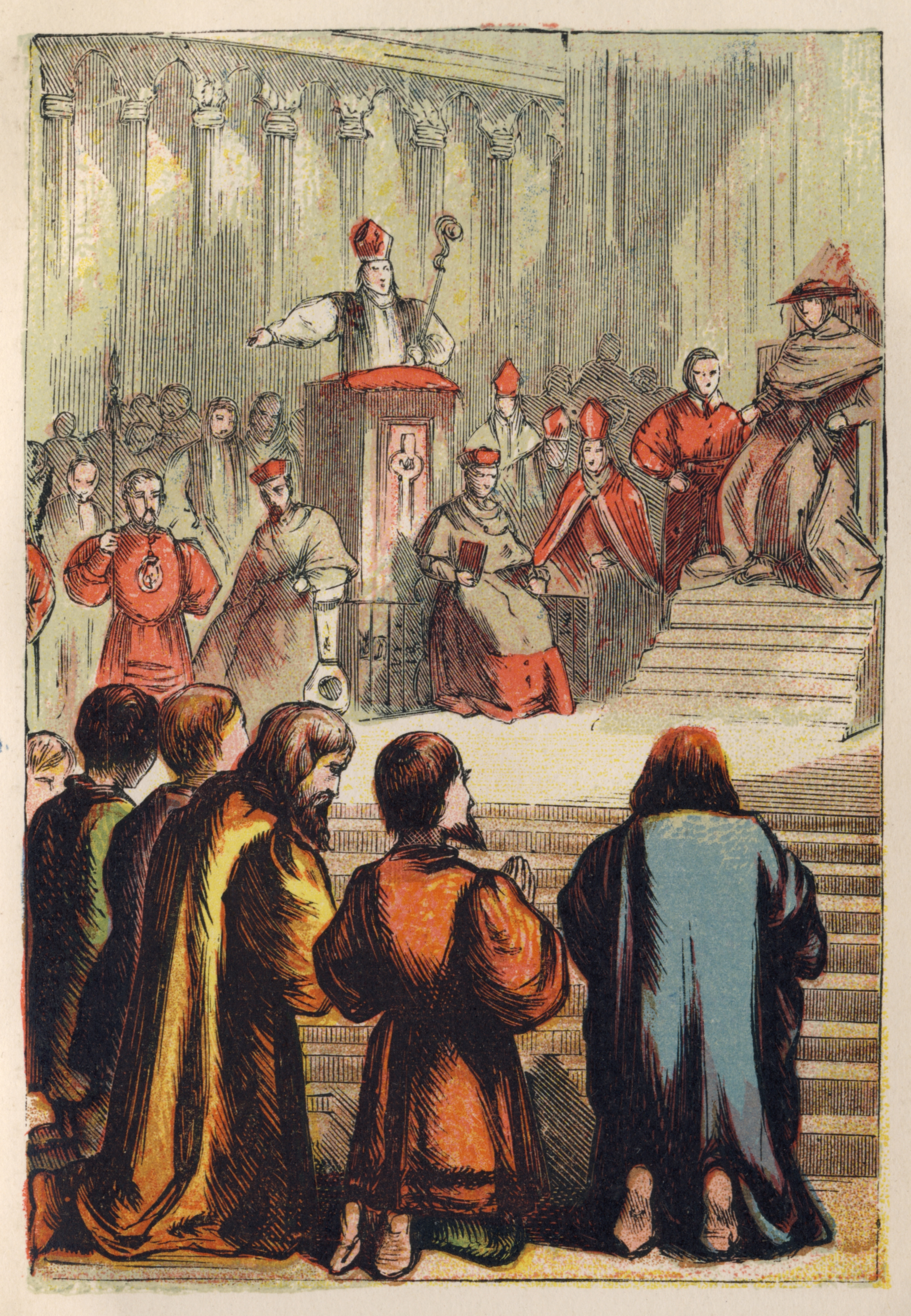
"Barnes and his Fellow-Prisoners Seeking Forgiveness", from an 1887 edition of Foxe's Book of Martyrs, illustrated by Kronheim.

Robert Barnes (c. 1495 – 30 July 1540) was an English reformer and martyr.

== Life ==
Barnes was born in King's Lynn, Norfolk in 1495, and was educated at Cambridge, where he was a priest of the Austin Friars. Sometime after 1514 he was sent to study in Leuven. Barnes returned to Cambridge in the early 1520s, where he graduated Doctor of Divinity in 1523, and, soon after, was made Prior of his Cambridge convent.

John Foxe says that Barnes was one of the Cambridge men who gathered at the White Horse Tavern for Bible-reading and theological discussion in the early 1530s. At the encouragement of Thomas Bilney, Barnes preached at the Christmas Day Midnight Mass in 1525 at St Edward's Church in Cambridge. Barnes' sermon, although against clerical pomp and ecclesiastical abuses, was neither particularly unorthodox nor surprising except it called out Cardinal Wolsey for worldliness. However, after seeing a churchwarden whose civil suit resulted in the imprisonment of a local man, Fr. Barnes departed from his prepared text to denounce lawsuits by one Christian against another - inside the parish church of Cambridge University's College of Lawyers. At a time when King Henry VIII and Cardinal Wolsey were attempting to stop the smuggling of Martin Luther's books into England from the Continent, Barnes' remarks immediately drew suspicion.

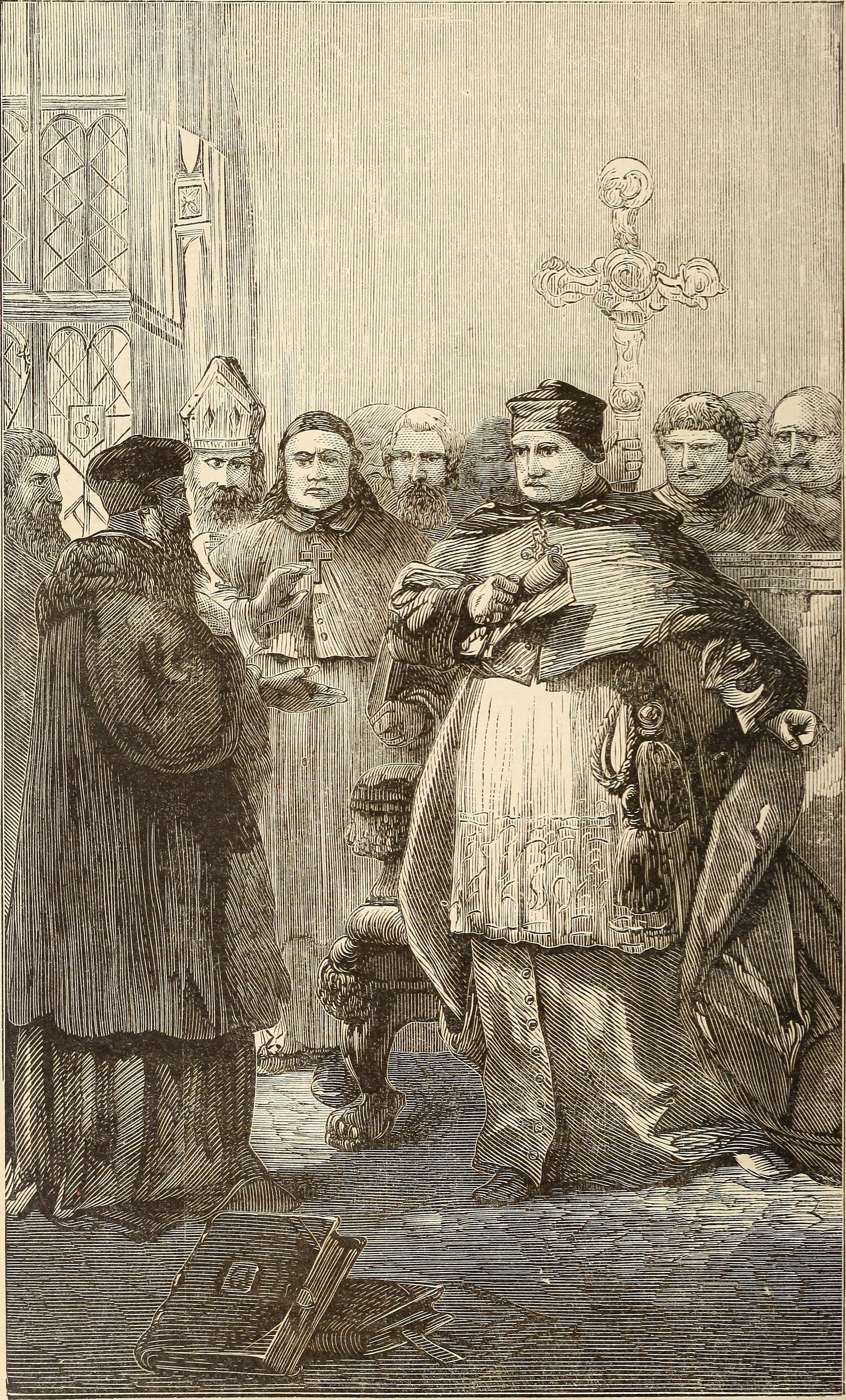
Barnes before Cardinal Wolsey, 1870 illustration

As a result, in 1526 Barnes was brought before the vice-chancellor for preaching an anti-clerical sermon on Christmas Eve based on a postil of Martin Luther, and was subsequently examined by Cardinal Wolsey's commission that included four bishops. He was ordered to abjure his sermon or be burnt; and, after choosing the former, carried faggots in a public procession in London.

He was then committed to the Fleet prison for six month, but afterwards conditionally released to the Austin Friary in London. Although under house arrest in the Friary, Barnes was allowed visitors. It was subsequently discovered that while incarcerated there, Barnes was secretly a distributor of copies of William Tyndale's New Testament with its novel translation choices and illegal Lutheran commentary.

After arranging a diversion involving a faked suicide attempt which had authorities searching a river for seven days, he escaped in disguise to Antwerp in 1528, and also visited Wittenberg, where he became good friends with Martin Luther. While at Wittenberg in the summer of 1531, Barnes was commissioned to ascertain the opinion of Luther and other continental divines on the divorce proceedings between Henry VIII and Catherine of Aragon. That year he also published the first edition of A Supplication, which essentially outlined Lutheran theology in an appeal to Henry VIII. Stephen Vaughan, an agent of Thomas Cromwell in the Low Countries and an advanced reformer, came across a copy of Barnes's work and was so impressed by his description of Lutheran political philosophy that he pleaded with Cromwell to invite the exile home.

In late 1531 Barnes returned to England, becoming one of the chief intermediaries between the English Court and the Lutheran German States, and he spent the next several years going between England and Germany. He was a vocal defender of King Henry's policy of Caesaropapism, in the vain hope that the King would choose Lutheranism for the theology of the Church of England. In 1539 Barnes was employed in negotiating with William, Duke of Jülich-Cleves-Berg for King Henry's marriage to Anne of Cleves. The policy was Cromwell's, but Henry VIII had already in 1538 refused to embrace Lutheranism, and the statute of Six Articles, followed by the immediate annulment of the King's marriage to Anne of Cleves in 1540, ultimately brought Cromwell and all other agents of his policies to ruin.

A denunciation by Barnes of Bishop Stephen Gardiner in a sermon at St Paul's Cross launched a battle to the death between the Crypto-Lutheran, Crypto-Calvinist, and Crypto-Catholic courtiers in King Henry's council, which raged during the spring of 1540. Barnes was forced to apologise and recant; and Bishop Gardiner delivered a series of counter-sermons at St Paul's Cross. But a month later Cromwell was made earl of Essex, Gardiner's friend, Bishop Sampson, was sent to the Tower, and Barnes openly reverted to Lutheranism, but it proved a delusive victory. In July, however, Cromwell was attainted, the marriage between the King and Anne of Cleves was annulled and Barnes was attainted and convicted of heresy and sentenced to execution by burning.

On 30 July, 1540, Barnes and five other religious dissidents were dragged by the feet, attached to wooden panels called hurdles, over the streets from the Tower of London to Smithfield, by horses, for execution. Each hurdle carried both a condemned Lutheran pastor and a condemned Catholic priest.

The two fellow Lutherans pastors; William Jerome and Thomas Gerrard, were, like Barnes, burnt at the stake for heresy under the Six Articles. Meanwhile, three Roman Catholic priests: Fr .Thomas Abel, Fr. Richard Fetherstone and Barnes' companion on the hurdle, Fr. Edward Powell, were hanged, drawn, and quartered, officially for high treason, but in reality for rejecting both the King's title as Supreme Head of the Church of England and State control over the Church.

== Legacy ==
Both Catholics and Lutherans throughout Europe were shocked and horrified by the executions. Some historians have concluded that Barnes was crucial in having the English Protestants and Catholics alike understand the Reformation around them.

The feast day of Rev. Barnes and his two companions is commemorated every year on the Lutheran Calendar of Saints.

The three Catholic priests executed with Barnes were among the fifty-four English Catholic Martyrs who were Beatified by Pope Leo XIII on 29 December, 1886.

== Literature ==
- Shortly after their executions, a dialogue in verse was published, The Metynge of Doctor Barnes and Dr. Powell at Paradise Gate and of theyre communicacion bothe drawen to Smithfylde fro the Towar (London, 1540), in the British Museum.
- Martin Luther published Barnes' confession after writing a preface of his own as Bekenntnis des Glaubens (1540).
- Robert Barnes also appears in The Mirror & the Light, by Hilary Mantel.

== See also ==
- St Edward's Passage
