= St Edward King and Martyr, Cambridge =

Coordinates: 52.20465°N 0.1186°E

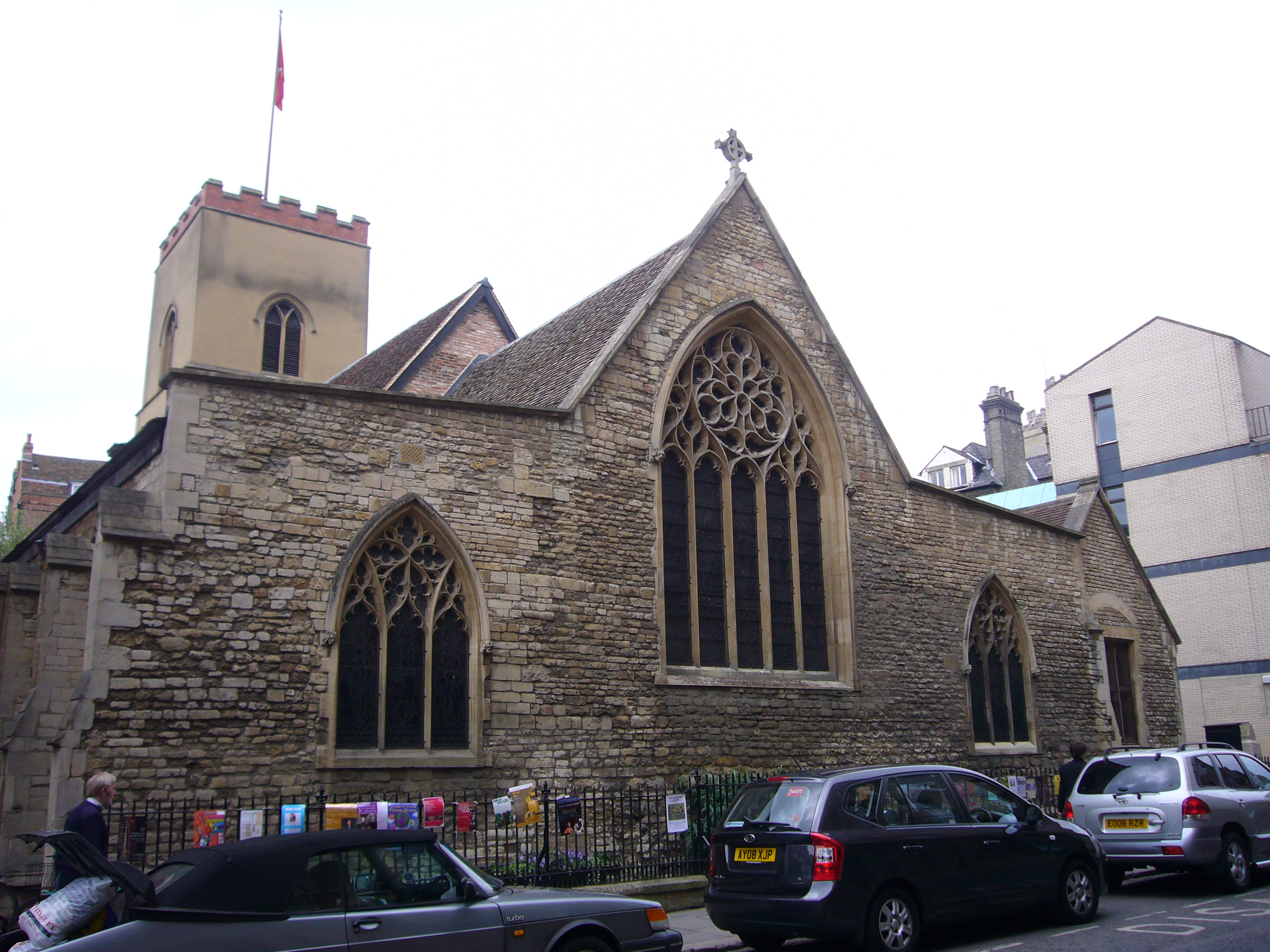
- St Edward King and Martyr, Cambridge
- Location: Peas Hill, Cambridge, Cambridgeshire, CB2 3PP
- Country: England
- Denomination: Church of England
- Website: Church website

History
- Status: Active
- Founded: 13th century

Administration
- Diocese: None (a Royal Peculiar)

St Edward King and Martyr is a church located on Peas Hill in central Cambridge, England. It is dedicated to Edward the Martyr, who was King of England from 975 until his murder in 978. In 1525 it was at St Edward's that what is said to have been perhaps the first "openly evangelical" sermon of the English Reformation was delivered, and the church is sometimes labelled the "Cradle of the Reformation".

It has been considered a royal peculiar, not belonging to a diocese, but this is disputed.

== History ==
=== Foundation ===
The present church was founded in the 13th century on what is believed to be the site of an earlier Anglo-Saxon church. In around 1400 the church was rebuilt, creating the present chancel and arches of the nave, though the arch at the base of the tower dates from the original building. There are some pictures and a description at the Cambridgeshire Churches website.

When Henry VI ordered the clearing of land in order to create King's College, the church of St John Zachary that was used by both Trinity Hall and Clare was demolished. In 1445, by way of recompense, the living of St Edward's Church was granted to Trinity Hall, and the Chaplain is still appointed by the college. Two 15th-century side-chapels were built in St Edward's, the north chapel used by Trinity Hall, and the south by Clare.

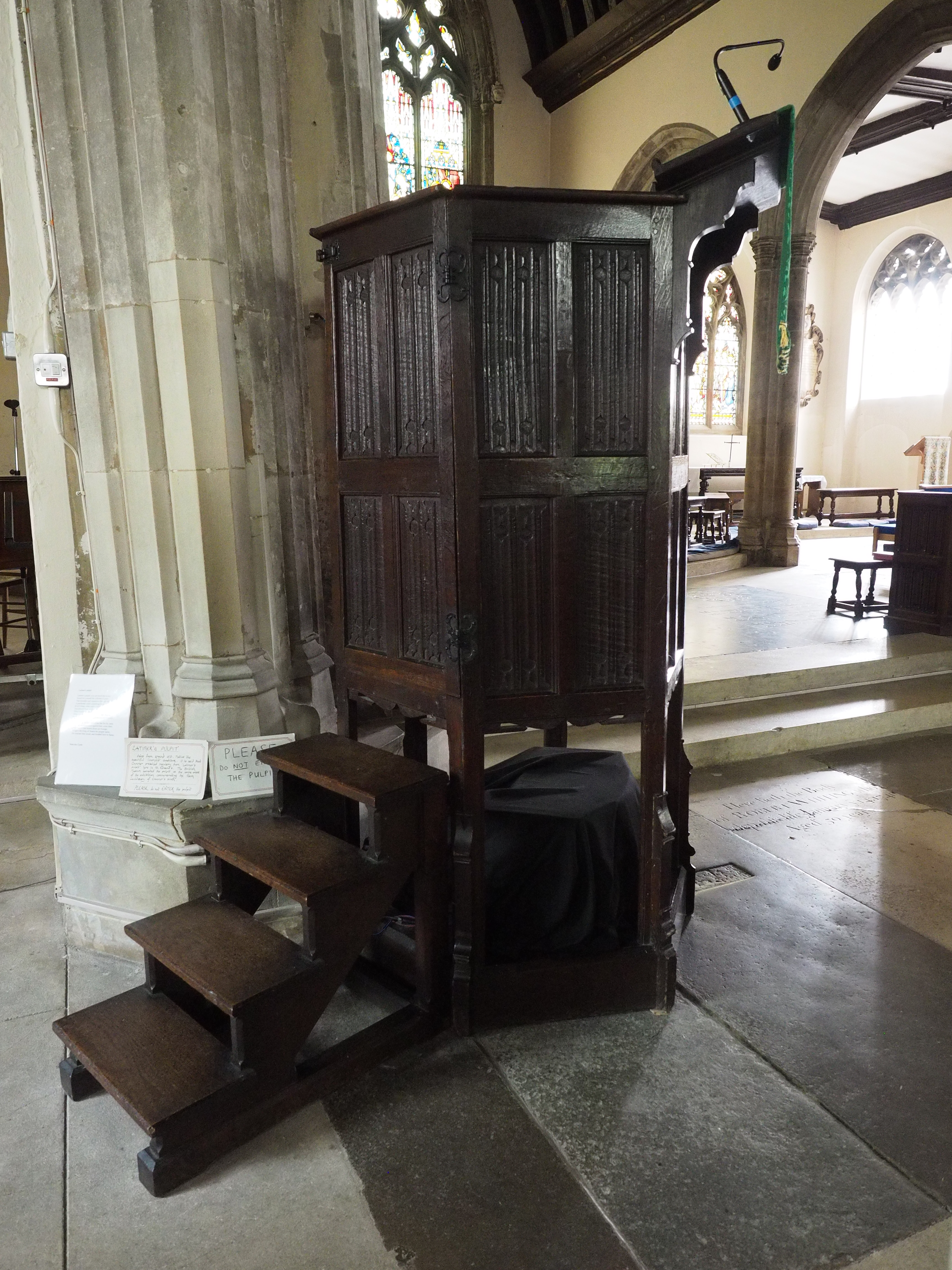
The pulpit, from which Hugh Latimer preached during the English Reformation

=== Reformation ===
St Edward's played a pivotal role in the English Reformation. During the 1520s a group of evangelicals led by Thomas Bilney had been meeting to discuss the preachings of Martin Luther and Erasmus's translation of the New Testament.

At the Midnight Mass on Christmas Eve 1525, one of the group, Robert Barnes, gave what is believed to be the first openly evangelical sermon in any English church, and accused the Catholic Church of heresy. Over the next decade many of the great reformers preached at St Edward's, including the Oxford Martyr Hugh Latimer, who was a regular preacher until he left Cambridge in 1531. These events have led to St Edward's being referred to as the "Cradle of the Reformation".

=== Recent history ===
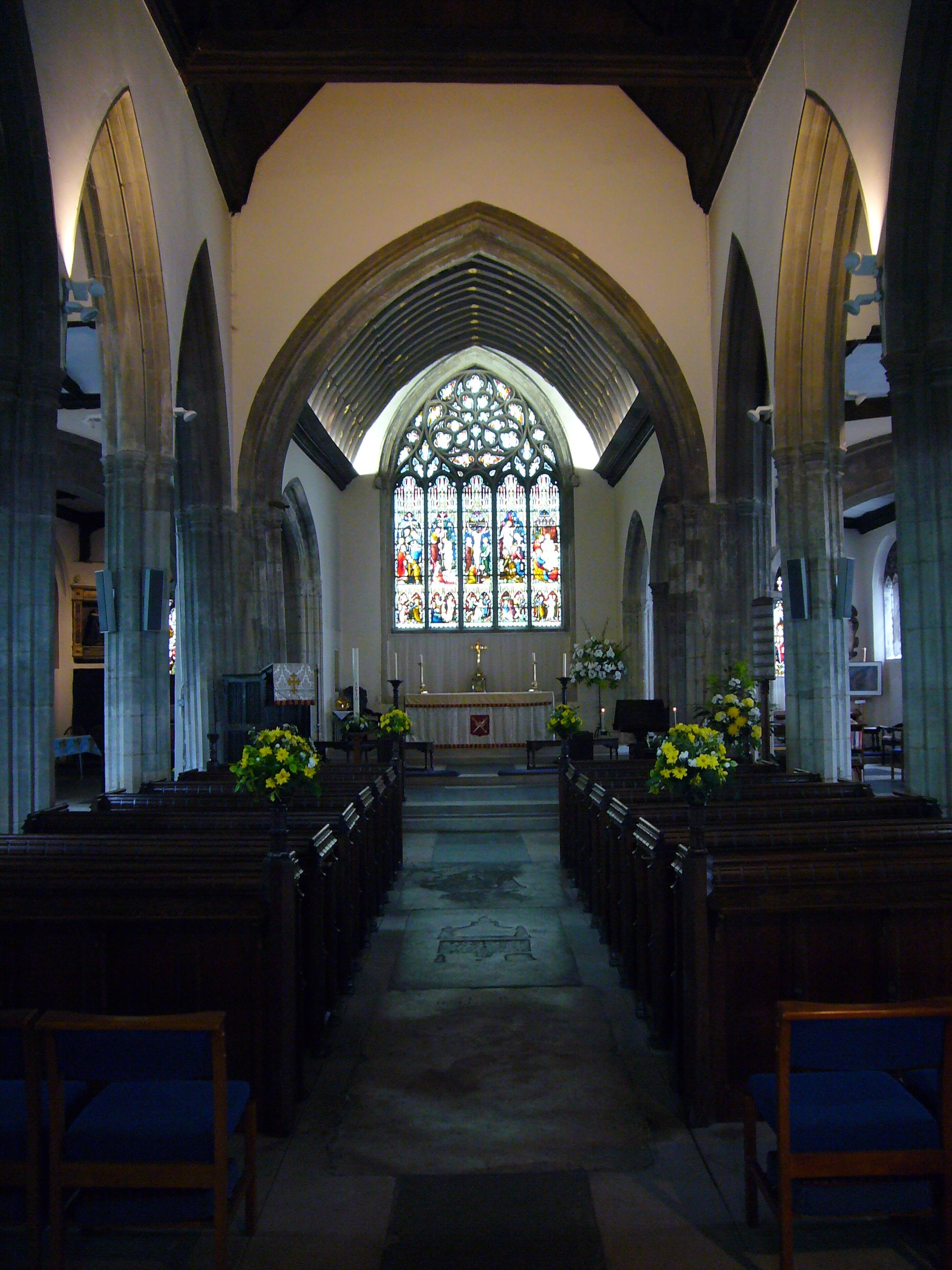
St Edward's (interior)

The buildings of central Cambridge have led to St Edward's becoming somewhat hidden away from view in its location on the west side of the Cambridge Guildhall. It is surrounded on three sides by its namesake pedestrian alleyway, St Edward's Passage, whose 'Y-shaped' form has remained unchanged since at least the 16th century: there is only a tiny churchyard. It holds Grade II* listed status.

During the 1930s, St Edward's served as the Toc H church for the east of England, and became popular with students, who referred to it as "Teddy's".

The present east window was designed by George Gilbert Scott and was added during the restorations of 1858–60. The theologian F. D. Maurice was chaplain at St Edward's from 1870 to 1872.

The acting vicar-chaplain is Reverend Dr Mark Scarlata, who is also Old Testament lecturer and tutor at St Mellitus College, London.
