= Ginn & Co Solicitors =

Coordinates: 52°12′24″N 0°07′15″E

- Headquarters: Cambridge, Cambridgeshire, England
- No. of offices: one
- No. of lawyers: 10 (2012)
- No. of employees: 19 (2012)
- Major practice areas: General practice
- Key people: Madeline Barham
- Date founded: 1873
- Founder: Samuel Reuben Ginn
- Company type: Partnership
- Dissolved: 1 October 2013

Ginn & Co Solicitors of Cambridge was a High Street law practice with offices at Sidney House, Sussex Street, Cambridge. It provided bespoke legal advice to individuals, businesses and college institutions for 140 years. The practice closed in 2013.

== History ==
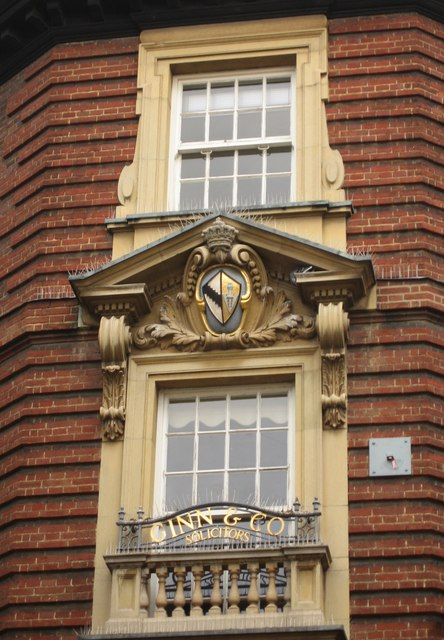
Ginn & Co Solicitors Cambridge, Sidney House

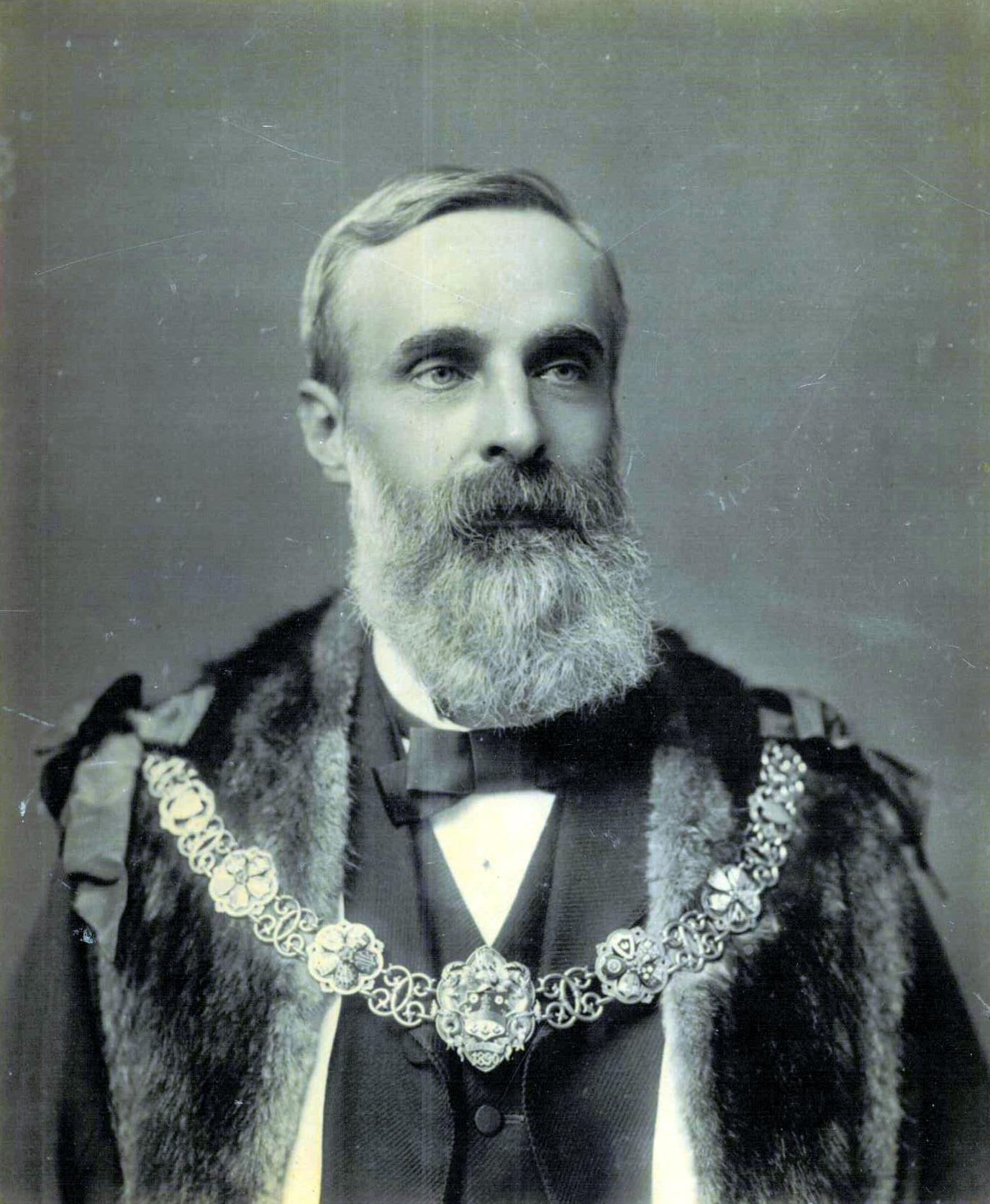
Samuel Reuben Ginn, Mayor of Cambridge (1897–1898) Cambridge, Ginn & Co Solicitors, Sidney House

The practice was established in 1873 by Samuel Reuben Ginn, the son of a St Ives solicitor, at his offices in Alexandra Street, Petty Cury. Samuel Ginn distinguished himself as a solicitor and was appointed to several important civic roles. He was elected to serve St Matthew's Ward in 1891 for the Liberal Party and was Mayor of Cambridge from 1897 to 1898. He was a Deputy Lieutenant of Cambridgeshire and a Justice of the Peace. During the First World War he administered the Prince of Wales' National Relief Fund. He was also Lord of the Manors of Fen Ditton, Harston and Haslingfield, and Farcet in Huntingdonshire.

By 1879 Ginn had moved his practice to new offices on 64 St Andrew's Street and had been appointed solicitor to the Cambridge Street Tramways Company. In 1880 he succeeded in obtaining parliamentary approval for the company to extend the tramway system.

In 1882 George Alfred Matthew joined Samuel Ginn to form the partnership of Ginn & Matthews and the firm moved next door to 63 St Andrews Street. Matthew had attended St John's College, Cambridge, and served as President of the Cambridgeshire Law Society. He was married to Norah Eaden Lilley the daughter of the proprietor of W. Eaden Lilley & Co., a well known Cambridge department store, for whom the firm acted.

Ginn & Matthew continued to attract more business clients. In 1897 they are instructed by Chivers & Sons, jam makers of Histon and Hudson's Cambridge and Pampisford Breweries Ltd. Hudson's owned many of Cambridge's popular pubs some of which still exist today and in 1898 Samuel Ginn helped them to secure a £75,000 debenture loan. In 1903 the firm assisted William Unwin of Histon in forming his company that went on to become the world-famous Unwins Seeds.

Geoffrey Garland Goodman, a law graduate of Pembroke College, Cambridge, joined the partnership in 1903. He remained a partner for 47 years until his death in 1950, and had the difficult task of guiding the firm through both World Wars.

George Matthew died suddenly aged 49 on 5 January 1905, in his office, and the name of the practice was changed to Ginn & Co. The following year Samuel Ginn’s son, Dennis Barton Ginn, was admitted as a partner after completing his law degree at Trinity Hall, Cambridge. Shortly after John Edward Few of Willingham who had read law at King's College, Cambridge was admitted as a partner. Few had built up a reputation for his knowledge of Agricultural Law and lectured at the University. During the First World War, Captain Dennis Barton Ginn saw service in Dardanelles at the Gallipoli Campaign and in Egypt, Palestine and France.

In 1910 Dennis Barton Ginn's second son, Benjamin Dennis Skelton Ginn was born. He went on to become Major "Skelly" Ginn who used his electrical engineering skills to help to mastermind some of the most daring escape attempts from Oflag VI-B, Colditz and other German PoW camps during the Second World War.

In June 1919 Few left the partnership of Ginn & Co to found his own practice in Sidney Street which later became Few & Kester which was based in Montagu House, Sidney Street (opposite Ginn & Co) until it merged with Cunningham John in 2004.

In 1934 Samuel Reuben Ginn died aged 82 and left an estate valued at some £5.5 million today with 150 acres of land in Huntingdonshire. He rewarded his loyal clerks at the firm with a bequest of £200 each, around £12000 today. Dennis Ginn succeeded his father as senior partner until his death in 1938 aged 59. In the same year his eldest son, Samuel Marsland Ginn, was admitted as a partner after reading law at Trinity Hall, but shortly afterwards saw service in the Second World War. On 3 December 1944 Major Samuel Marsland Ginn was killed in action, aged 32, at Venray in the Netherlands bringing an end to the Ginn association with the firm.

Eric John Gipson Wright of March in the Isle of Ely was articled to Geoffrey Garland Goodman in 1930. In 1939 he became a partner and together with Geoffrey Garland Goodman oversaw the expansion of the firm after the War and its relocation to the newly built neo-Georgian, Sidney House on Sussex Street.

In 1971 Ginn & Co instructed Donald Keating QC in the Mitchell v East Anglia Regional Health Board Administration case. The case was won, breaking all records, and features in the Guinness Book of Records as the longest commercial arbitration at 239 days.

Clive Nicholas Lane was admitted as a partner in 1987 and left in 2001 upon his appointment to the judiciary. In 2009 the Lord Chancellor, The Right Honourable Jack Straw MP, appointed him to be a Senior Immigration Judge of the Asylum and Immigration Tribunal.

In 2011 the firm secured a civil remedy using the Protection from Harassment Act 1997 at the Court of Appeal of England and Wales for a client who had been subjected to a seven-year campaign of persistent and obsessive harassment. The judgment was endorsed on Appeal in the Supreme Court in February 2013.

In April 2012 the firm was awarded Lexcel the Law Society's legal practice quality mark for excellence in legal practice management and excellence in client care. In 2013 Sidney Sussex College announced their £2.4m plan to create 28 student rooms in Sidney House.

On 1 October 2013 after 140 years in the heart of Cambridge Ginn & Co closed.

=== List of partners ===
- Samuel Reuben Ginn (1873–1932)
- George Alfred Matthew (1882–1905)
- Geoffrey Garland Goodman (1903–1950)
- Dennis Barton Ginn (1906–1938)
- John Edward Few (1907–1919)
- Samuel Marsland Ginn (1938–1944)
- Eric John Gipson Wright (1939–1971)
- Geoffrey Edwin Smart (1951–1989)
- David James Tempest Miller (1961–1990)
- James Andrew Holme (1974–2000)
- Clive Nicholas Lane (1987–2001)
- Jill Hinton Jones (1991–2006)
- Madeline Barham (2001– 2013)
- Jonathan Peter Copper (2001–2013)

== Main practice areas ==
- Wills, Probate, Lasting Powers of Attorney, Trusts
- Inheritance Tax Planning
- Residential Conveyancing
- Family, Divorce, Children, Pre and Post-Nuptial Agreements, Civil Partnership
- Business, Sales and Acquisitions
- Commercial Property
- Landlord and Tenant
- Employment
- Civil Litigation
- Contentious Probate
- Elder Law
