= Sidney Street =

Sidney Street may refer to:

- The Siege of Sidney Street, a notorious gunfight in London's East End in 1911
- Sidney Street, Cambridge, England
