= St Mary's Street, Cambridge =

Street in Cambridge, England

Coordinates: 52.20552°N 0.11827°E

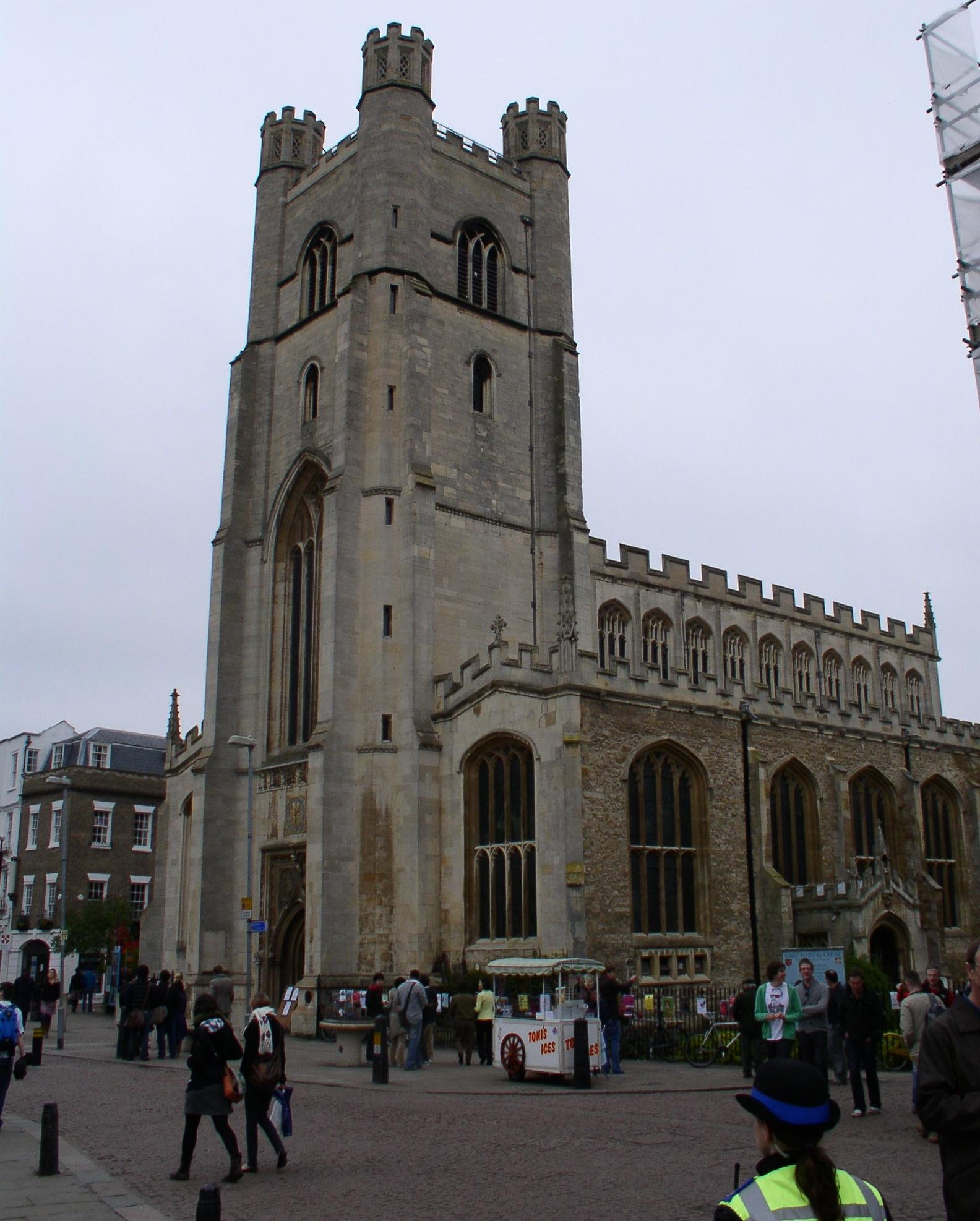
Great St Mary's, the University Church, from the southwest, with St Mary's Passage in front and St May's Street behind.

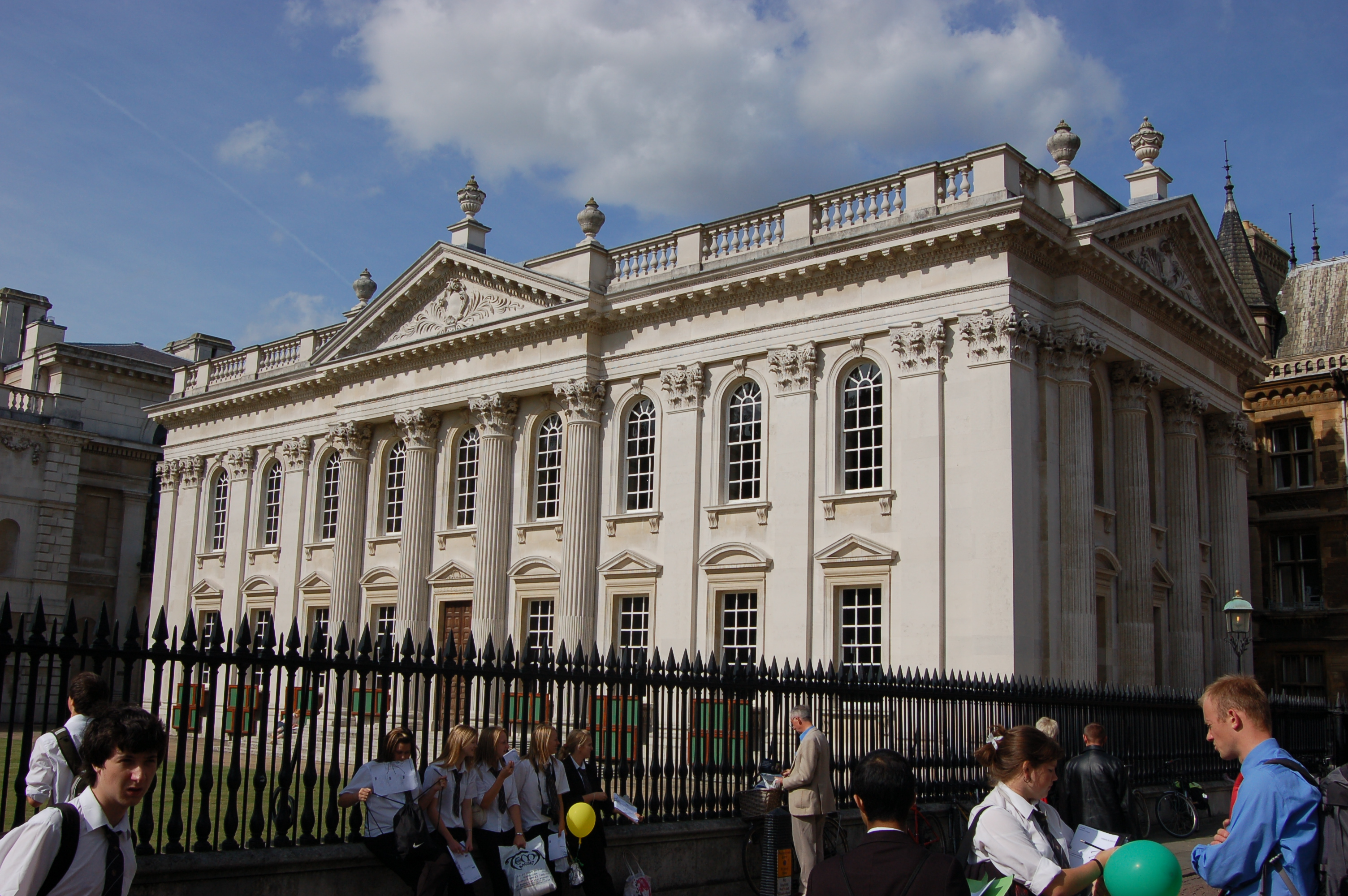
The Senate House viewed from the junction of St Mary's Street and King's Parade.

St Mary's Street is a historic street in the centre of the University area in Cambridge, England. The street links with the junction of King's Parade and Trinity Street to the west, along which many of the University's oldest colleges are to be found. To the east is Market Hill, the location of the city's Market Square. The street continues as Market Street.

The Church of St Mary the Great is immediately to the south, hence the name of the street. This acts as the church of the Cambridge University. Immediately to the west of St Mary's Street is the University's Senate House, where degree ceremonies are held. To the south of St Mary's church is the pedestrianised St Mary's Passage, also linking King's Parade and Market Hill.

The Old Schools Site, a University of Cambridge site, covers the Old Schools, the Senate House, and Great St Mary's, including St Mary's Street and St Mary's Passage. The University Proctor's Office is located on the south side of St Mary's Passage (at No. 1).

Bowes & Bowes was a bookseller and publishing company located at 1 Trinity Street, a corner position at the junction with St Mary's Street. It has a claim to be the oldest bookshop in the United Kingdom, with books having been sold on the site since 1581. The Bowes & Bowes shop closed in 1986 and it was taken over by Sherratt & Hughes, which itself closed in 1992. Since then, the site has become the Cambridge University Press bookshop.
