= Eaden Lilley =

Former department store chain

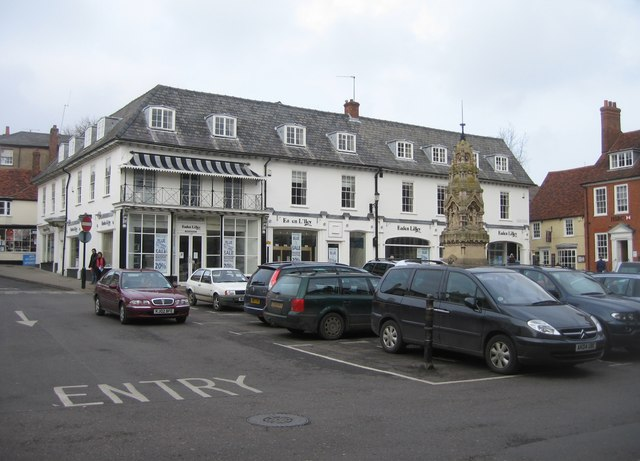
Eaden Lilley branch in Saffron Walden, 2009

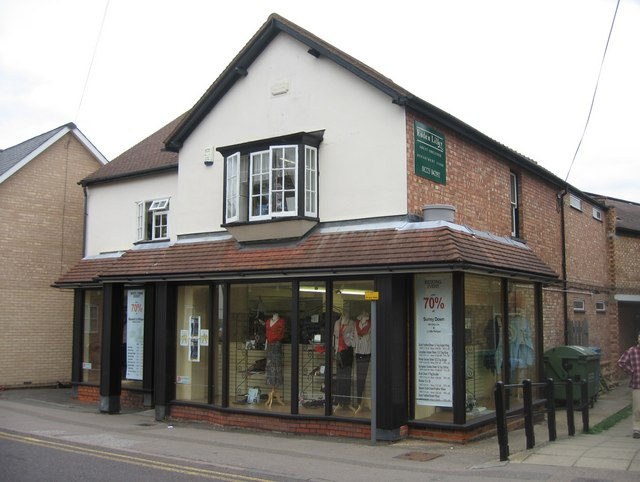
Eaden Lilley branch in Great Shelford, 2008

Eaden Lilley was a small chain of department stores that started in Cambridge.

== History ==
In 1760, the mayor of Cambridge John Purchas owned a haberdashery. In 1784 the business was sold to Joseph Hart, who had formed a partnership with Joseph Ansell. The same year they took an apprentice William Eaden <Country Apprentices 1710-1808, TNA>. In 1793 Ansell sold his shares in the business to Thomas Hovell, and the business became known as Hart & Hovell. In 1798 William Eaden, who had married the niece of one of the owners Joseph Hart <27 Aug 1793, St Lawrence Jewry & St Mary Milk St, London>, joined the firm and worked his way up to being the sole owner. One of William's daughters married David Lilley, and their son William Eaden Lilley took over the business in 1839, renaming it Eaden Lilley. The store was originally located in Shoemaker's Row, but eventually moved to Market Street, with the store selling haberdashery, linens and drapery, some hardware and an oil shop supplying oils for lighting, heating and treating harness leather. In 1879, the store was damaged by a severe storm, with over three inches of rain falling within six hours and the cost run into several thousand pounds.

In 1883, William Eaden Lilley's son, also William Eaden Lilley took over the family business from his father. The business had grown from one store on Market Street, to having branches in Sidney Street and Green Street. The business was now described as a department store, although the departments were spread across the different branches and in 1888 the business was incorporated.

In 1900, Eaden Lilley was joined next door by fellow Cambridge department store, Joshua Taylor. The business continued in this guise until 1928, when the Market Street store was rebuilt. Other business ran by Eaden Lilley included a removals business, which in 1934 moved the entire contents of Cambridge University Library across the city.

The business continued to grow and opened new stores in Saffron Walden and Woollards Lane, Great Shelford. However, in the early 1990s the Cambridge store was redeveloped to become a smaller Eaden Lilley and a WH Smith. However this did not go as planned and the Eaden Lilley store was closed in 1999, becoming a Borders bookshop and a Cafe Nero. WH Smith, Cafe Nero and TK Maxx now operate from the site.

The business however continued, and in 2003 they purchased the Bryants department store in St Ives. The St Ives store in 2007 won the Retailer of the Year award at the Huntingdonshire Business Awards.

However, in January 2009, Eaden Lilley was put into administration with the stores in Saffron Walden & Great Shelford closing. The St Ives shop was kept open and was bought by C J Townrow & Sons, a small department store chain based in Braintree, Essex.
