= Market Hill =

Market Hill may refer to:

- Market Hill, Cambridge, England, a market square
- Market Hill, Southam, Warwickshire, England, a street
- Markethill, a village in County Armagh, Northern Ireland
  - Markethill Swifts F.C., an association football club in the village
