= Charles Clayton (cricketer) =

English cricketer and clegyman

Personal information
- Full name: Charles Clayton
- Born: 13 July 1813; Cambridge, Cambridgeshire, England
- Died: 18 October 1883 (aged 70); Stanhope, County Durham, England
- Batting: Unknown

Career statistics
Competition	First-class
Matches	1
Runs scored	3
Batting average	1.50
100s/50s	–/–
Top score	2
Catches/stumpings	–/–
- Source: Cricinfo, 21 July 2020

Charles Clayton (13 July 1813 – 18 October 1883) was an English first-class cricketer and clergyman.

The son of Robert Clayton, he was born at Cambridge in July 1813. He was educated at The Perse School, before going up to Gonville and Caius College, Cambridge in 1832. He gained his bachelor's degree in 1836, with Clayton being a recipient of the Browne Medal in 1833 and 1834. He remained at Cambridge to study for his master's degree, during which time he became a fellow of the college. He was ordained in the Church of England as a deacon at Salisbury in 1837, before becoming a priest at Rochester in 1838. Clayton graduated from Cambridge in 1839, returning to Cambridge to lecture on Hebrew language in 1842; concurrently he was the curate of St John's, Rochester until 1845, with his lecturing engagement at Cambridge coming to an end in 1844.

He served as secretary to the Pastoral Aid Society from 1845 to 1851. While based in Kent, Clayton made a single appearance in first-class cricket for the Gentlemen of Kent against the Gentlemen of England at Lord's in 1850. Batting twice in the match, he was dismissed for a single run in the Gentlemen of Kent first innings by Jones Nash, while in their second innings he was dismissed by the same bowler for 2 runs. He returned to Cambridge as a tutor at Gonville and Caius in 1851, where he also took up the post of vicar of Holy Trinity Church, Cambridge which he held until 1865. He was made an honorary canon of Ripon Cathedral in 1864, while the following year he moved north to County Durham, becoming the rector of Stanhope where he died 21 October 1883.
