= List of people from Bishop's Stortford =

Listed below are notable individuals linked with Bishop's Stortford in Hertfordshire, United Kingdom.

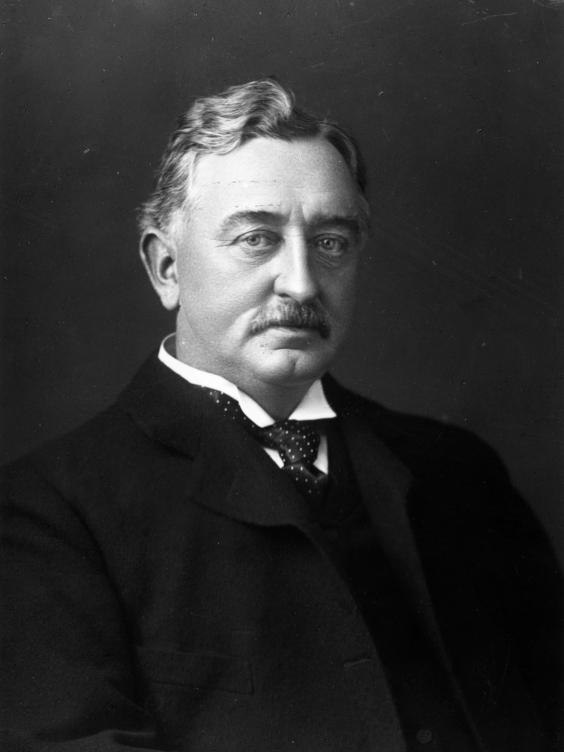
Cecil Rhodes

== Arts and media ==
- Lynda Baron (1939–2022), an actress who played Nurse Gladys Emanuel in Open All Hours, lived in the town.
- Eliot Bliss (1903–1990), a novelist and poet, lived here for over half a century.
- Russell Brand (born 1975), an actor, went to Hockerill Anglo-European College.
- Charli XCX (born 1992), a singer and songwriter attended Bishop's Stortford College.
- Paul Epworth, an Oscar and Grammy-winning producer, was born in the town.
- Flux of Pink Indians, an anarcho-punk band, originated in Bishop's Stortford in 1980.
- James Frain (born 1968), an actor who played Thomas Cromwell in The Tudors, attended St Joseph's Catholic Primary School.
- Greg James (born 1985), a radio broadcaster and writer, was raised in the town and attended The Bishop's Stortford High School.
- Bill Sharpe (born 1952), a keyboardist and founding member of Shakatak, a jazz-funk and jazz fusion band, was born in the town and attended Bishop's Stortford College.
- Sam Smith (born 1992), an English singer/songwriter, winner of the 2014 BRIT Critics' Choice Award and BBC's Sound of 2014, attended St Mary's Catholic School.
- Jon Thorne (born 1967), a double bass player and composer, was born in the town.
- Third Party, an anthemic dance duo, were both born in the town.
- Ed Drewett (born 1988), a Brit and Ivor Novello nominated songwriter, whose contributions include Teddy Swims, One Direction, The Wanted, Little Mix, SG Lewis and Jonas Blue, was raised in the town and attended The Bishop's Stortford High School.

== Education and science ==
- Frederick Scott Archer (1813–1857) was the inventor of the collodion process, the first photographic emulsion used to create glass negatives.
- Wilfred Bion (1897–1979), influential psychoanalyst and President of the British Psychoanalytical Society from 1962 to 1965 attended Bishop's Stortford College.
- Helen King (born 1965), Principal of St Anne's College, Oxford and a former senior police officer, was born in Bishop's Stortford.
- Sarah Ockwell-Smith (born 1970s), a child-care author, attended Hertfordshire and Essex High School in 1987–1992.

== Politics and business ==
- Martin Caton, Labour MP for Gower, was born in Bishop's Stortford.
- Nick de Bois, former Conservative MP for Enfield North, lives in the town.
- Frederick Chase Capreol (1803–1886), a businessman and railway and canal promoter in Ontario, Canada, was born in Bishop's Stortford.
- Walter Gilbey, a businessman, wine merchant and philanthropist.
- Cecil Rhodes, (1853–1902) as the son of the vicar of St Michael's Church, was the effective founder of the state of Rhodesia (now Zambia and Zimbabwe), and of the De Beers diamond company and the Rhodes Scholarship.
- Caroline Spelman, Conservative MP and former cabinet minister, was born in Bishop's Stortford and attended the Hertfordshire and Essex High School.

== Religion ==
- Francis Dane (born 1615), born in Bishop's Stortford, he fought against the persecution of purported witches during the Salem Witch Trials and was pastor of North Parish in Andover, Massachusetts.
- George Jacobs (1609–1692) was executed during the Salem Witch Trials.
- John Norton (divine)

== Sports ==
- Ben Clarke (born 1968), ex-England Rugby Union international and British Lions representative, attended Bishop Stortford College.
- Ernie Cooksey (1980–2008), professional footballer, was born in the town.
- Glenn Hoddle (born 1957), Tottenham Hotspur and England footballer, bought his first house at Thorley Park.
- Callum Ilott (born 1998), professional racing driver in FIA Formula 2, attended Bishop's Stortford College.
- Jones Nash (1812–1877), first-class cricketer
- Callum McNaughton, professional footballer with West Ham United, attended Hockerill Anglo-European College.
- John Radford (born 1947), professional footballer with Arsenal, was more recently Bishop's Stortford FC manager and resident in the town.
- Edward Shaw (1892–1916), cricketer and army officer
- David Surridge (born 1956), cricketer
- Ashley Sutton (born 1994), professional racing driver in the British Touring Car Championship (2017 and 2020 champion), attended Birchwood High School
