= Sussex Street =

Sussex Street may refer to:

- Sussex Street, Cambridge, England
- Sussex Street, Sydney, Australia
- Sussex Drive, Ottawa, Canada, called Sussex Street before 1967
