= Market Hill, Cambridge =

Street in Cambridge, England

Coordinates: 52.2054°N 0.1191°E

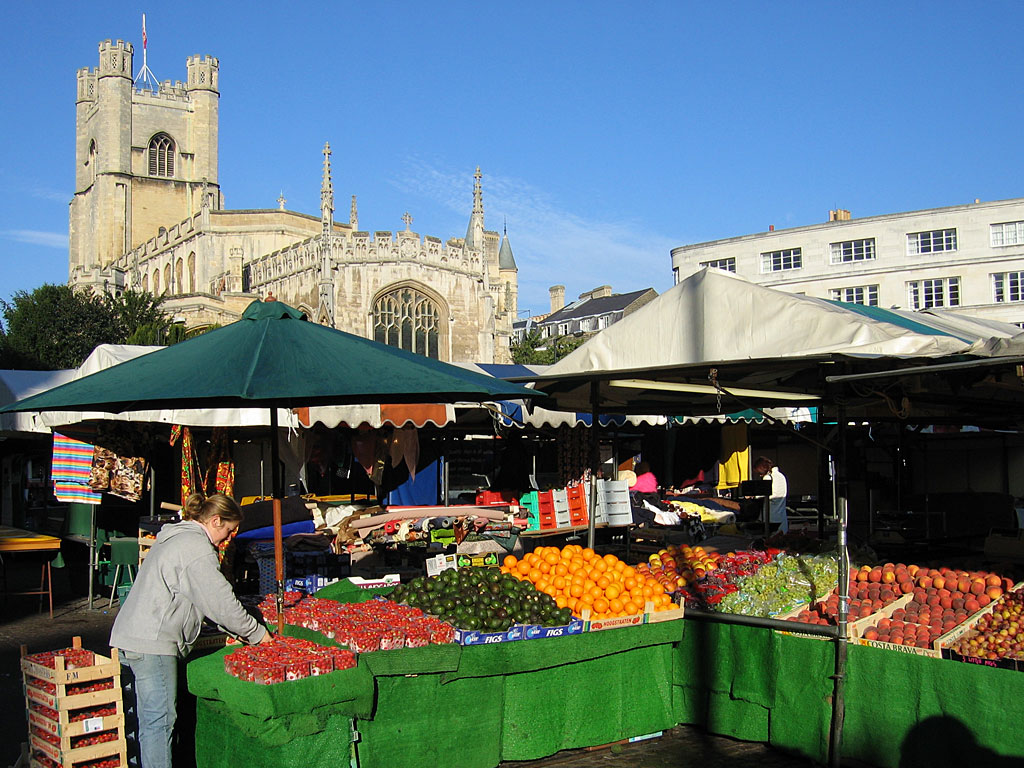
Market stalls in the Market Square, with Great St Mary's, the Cambridge University Church, in the background.

Market Hill (aka the Market Square) is the location of the marketplace in central Cambridge, England. Operating as a marketplace since Saxon times, a daily outdoor market with stalls continues to run there.

== Description ==
The market square commands a central location in Cambridge. It is connected via the following streets (clockwise from the north):

- Rose Crescent (pedestrianised), north towards Trinity Street
- Market Street. east towards Sidney Street
- Petty Cury (pedestrianised), east towards the junction of Sidney Street and St Andrew's Street
- Guildhall Street, south towards Guildhall Place and Wheeler Street
- Peas Hill (partially pedestrianised), south towards Wheeler Street and Bene't Street
- St Mary's Passage (pedestrianised), west towards King's Parade
- St Mary's Street, west also towards King's Parade
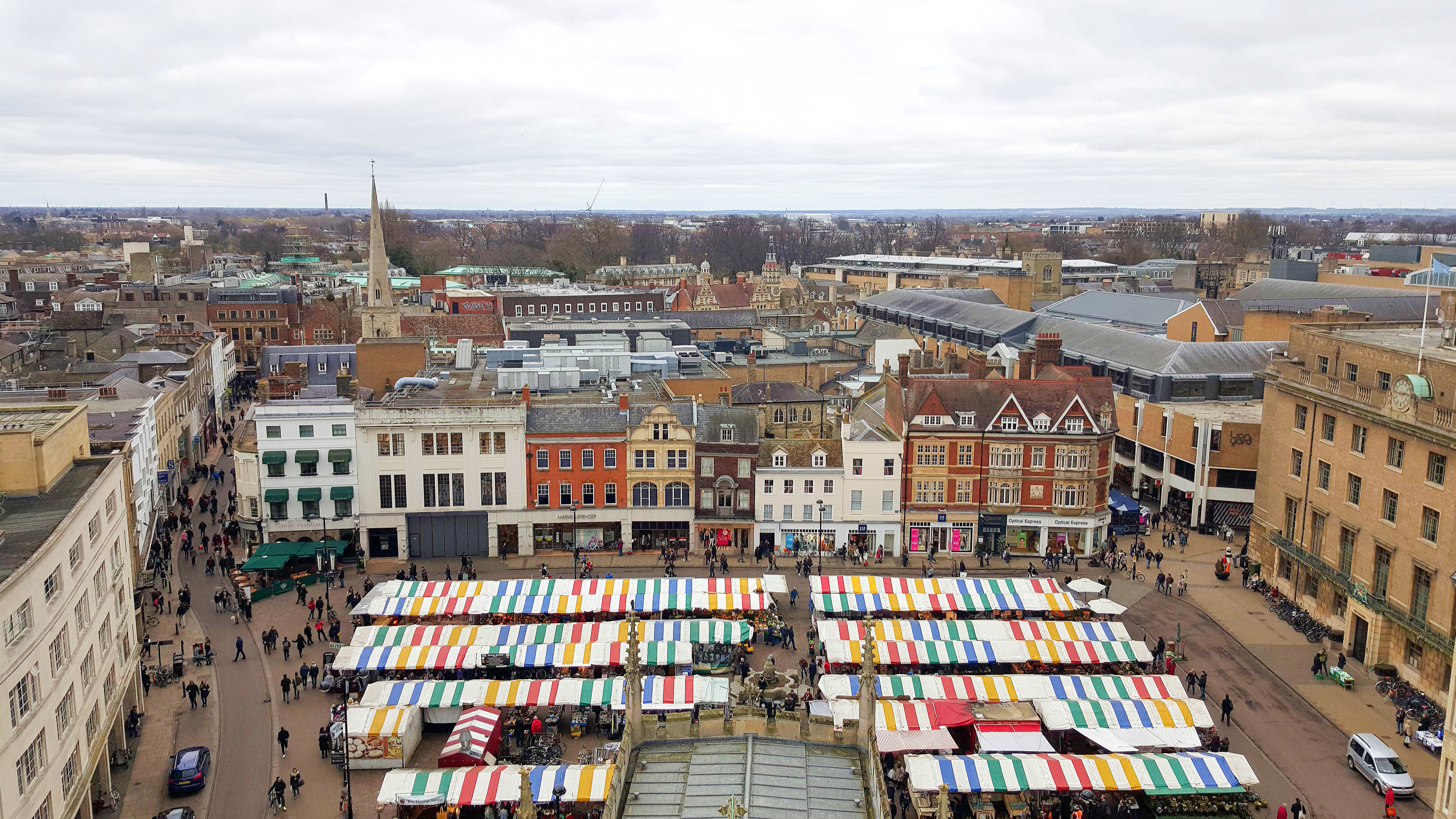

View from Great St Mary's tower

On the west side of Market Hill is Great St Mary's, the Cambridge University Church, with its tower on King's Parade. On the south side of the Market Square is the Cambridge Guildhall, built in the 1930s. To the southeast are the Grand Arcade and Lion Yard, two shopping centres.

The current Market Square was mainly filled with buildings originally and was not cleared until 1849 when a major fire occurred.

== Hobson's Conduit ==
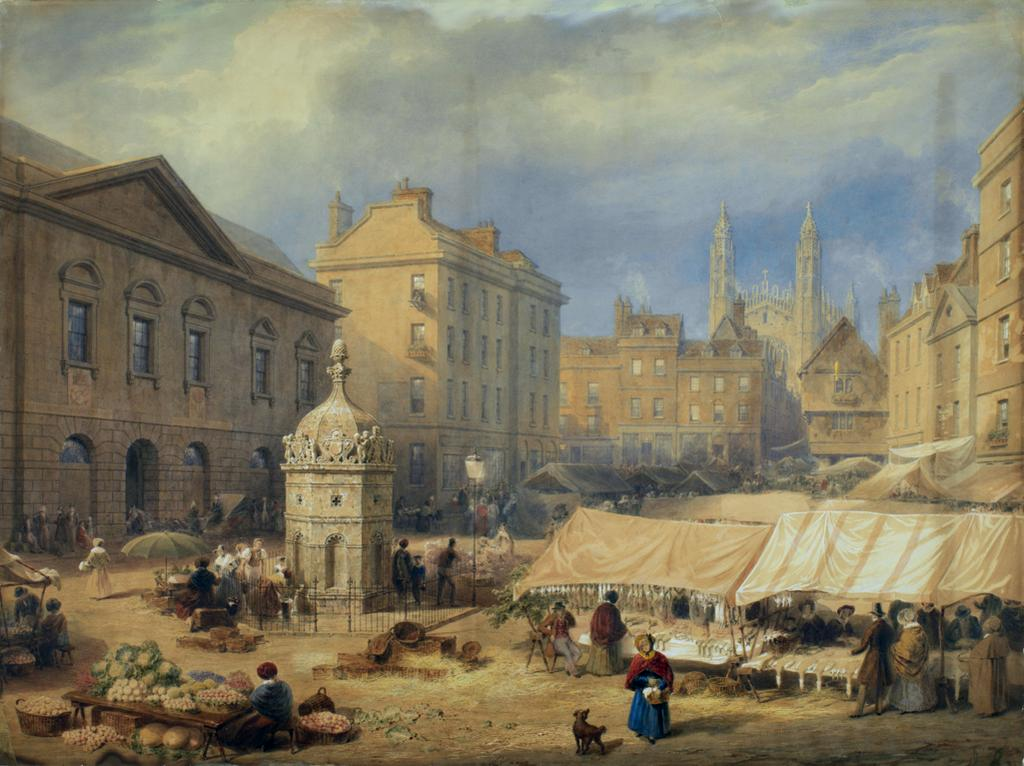
1841 watercolour showing the Hobson's Conduit fountain in the market place.

The Market Place branch of Hobson's Conduit was completed in 1614. This branch brought fresh water to the Market fountain in the centre of the Market Place. Following the fire in 1849, the Market Square was redeveloped and in 1855 a Gothic Revival gabled fountain was erected and the original structure of Hobson's Conduit was moved to the corner of Lensfield Road and Trumpington Road in south Cambridge in 1856. Most of the fountain was demolished in 1953. Flow to this branch was cut off in 1960 during construction of the Lion Yard shopping centre development and has never been restored.

== Peasants' Revolt of 1381 ==
During the 1381 Peasants' Revolt, a mob led by the Mayor of Cambridge destroyed the university's ledgers in Market Square on 16 June. One Margery Starre led the crowd in a dance to the rallying cry "Away with the learning of clerks, away with it!".
