= Station Road, Cambridge =

Road in southeast Cambridge, England

Coordinates: 52°11′41″N 0°08′00″E

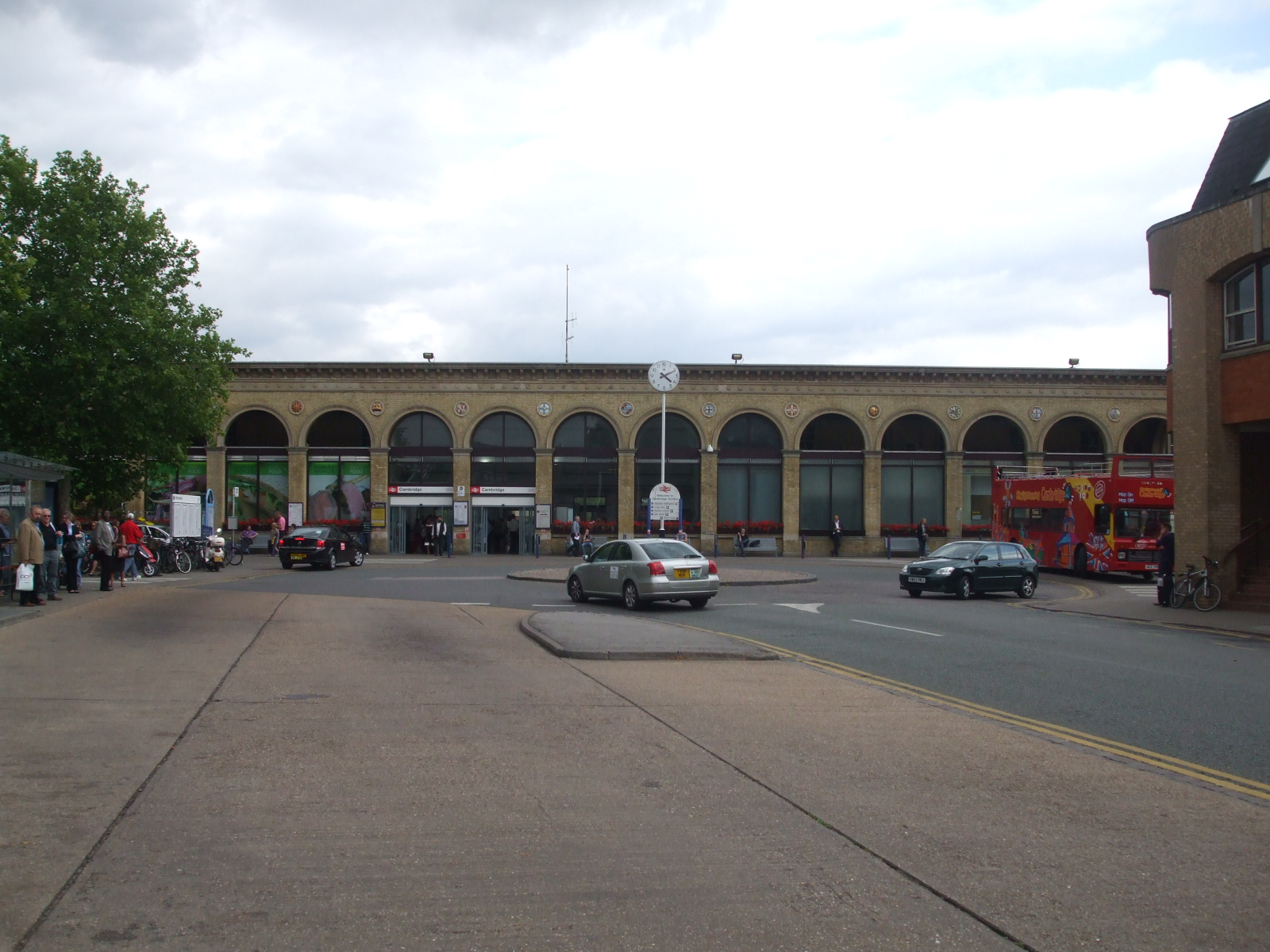
The roundabout at the end of Station Road, with the railway station behind.

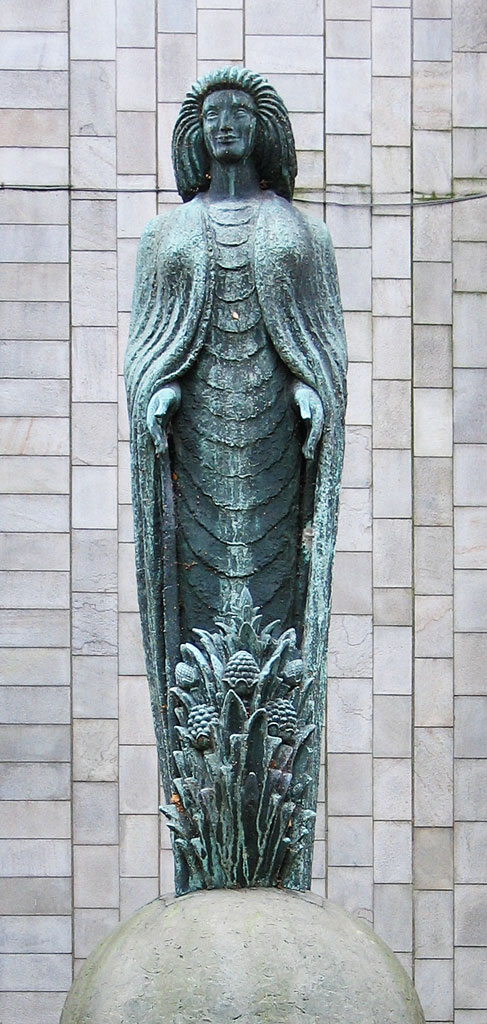
Sculpture of Ceres on Foster Mill in Station Road.

Station Road is a road in southeast Cambridge, England. It leads from a junction with traffic lights on Hills Road (A1307) to the Cambridge railway station. At the western end of Station Road on the opposite side of Hills Road is the Cambridge University Botanic Garden.

== Buildings ==
The station and a war memorial at the two ends of the road are Grade II listed. The view along Station Road has a leafy appearance. There are a number of Victorian houses on the north side of the road. These have lost their gardens and been converted for commercial use.

The south side of the road is main large modern buildings. For example, Jupiter House was built in 1974. It was reclad in the 1980s. Daedalus House is also located on the south side.

In 2016 a major redevelopment of the eastern end of Station Road was undertaken by the CB1 estate. Five major buildings were constructed providing approximately 500,000 SQ FT of office space. 30 Station Road was the last of these buildings to be constructed, slated for completion in 2020.

=== Foster's Mill ===
Foster's Mill (also known as Foster Mills, Foster Mill and Spiller's Mill), off Station Road, was built of painted gault brick in 1898, designed by the architects Gelder and Kitchen of Hull. It is one of the largest buildings in Cambridge, as well as being one of the few examples of large-scale industry in the city. The Foster family owned three mills in the city but the University of Cambridge prevented them from constructing railway lines to them, so they built this mill immediately next to the railway station.

In 1917, Foster's Mill was sold to Pauls Agriculture and in 1947 it was sold to Spillers. Additions were made to the building in 1953. In 2000, it was owned by Rank Hovis. In 2001, it was announced that Rank Hovis would vacate the site eventually to enable redevelopment of the site.

The Foster family also founded Fosters' Bank for use by their mill workers, with a site in Sidney Street in central Cambridge. The building (now a Lloyds Bank branch) was designed by the Victorian architect Alfred Waterhouse and built 1890–93. The name still exists over the doorway. The interior of the bank is vaulted and highly decorated with tiles,

On 27 March 2010, during extensive demolition work on the mill, a major fire "accidentally" broke out which damaged the mill buildings causing their partial collapse. The remaining section of the building will become 19 residential apartments as part of the CB1 development.

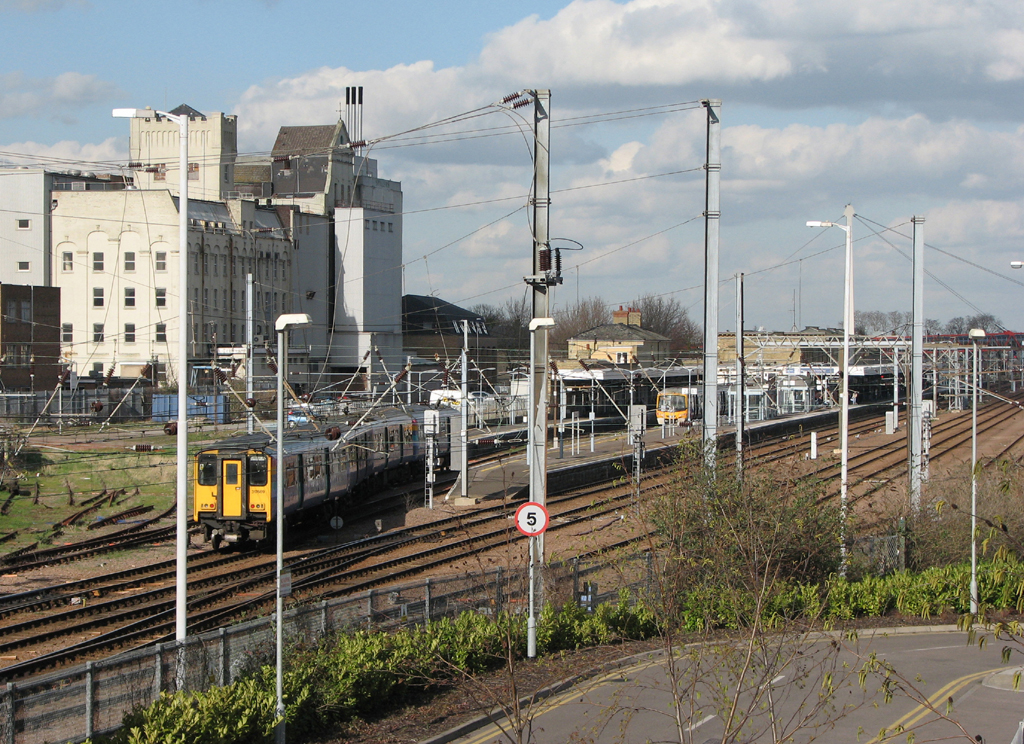
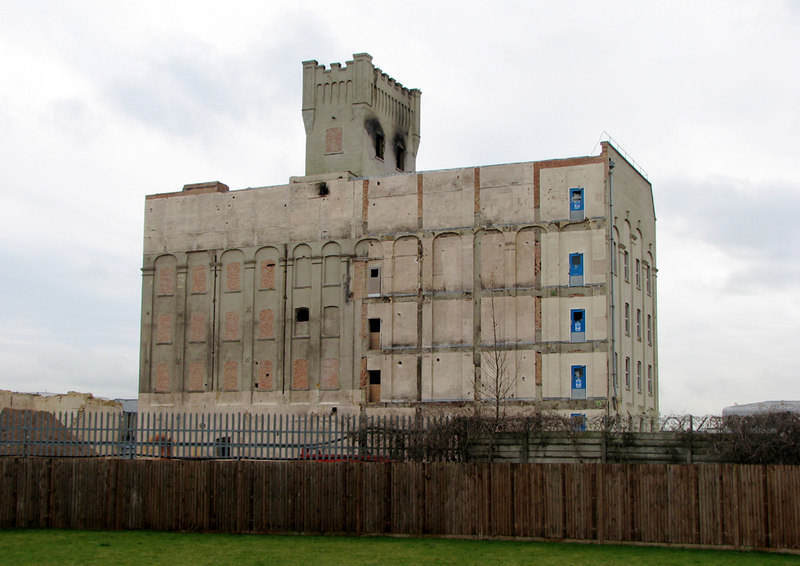
Foster's Mill before and after the 2010 fire.

=== Demeter House ===
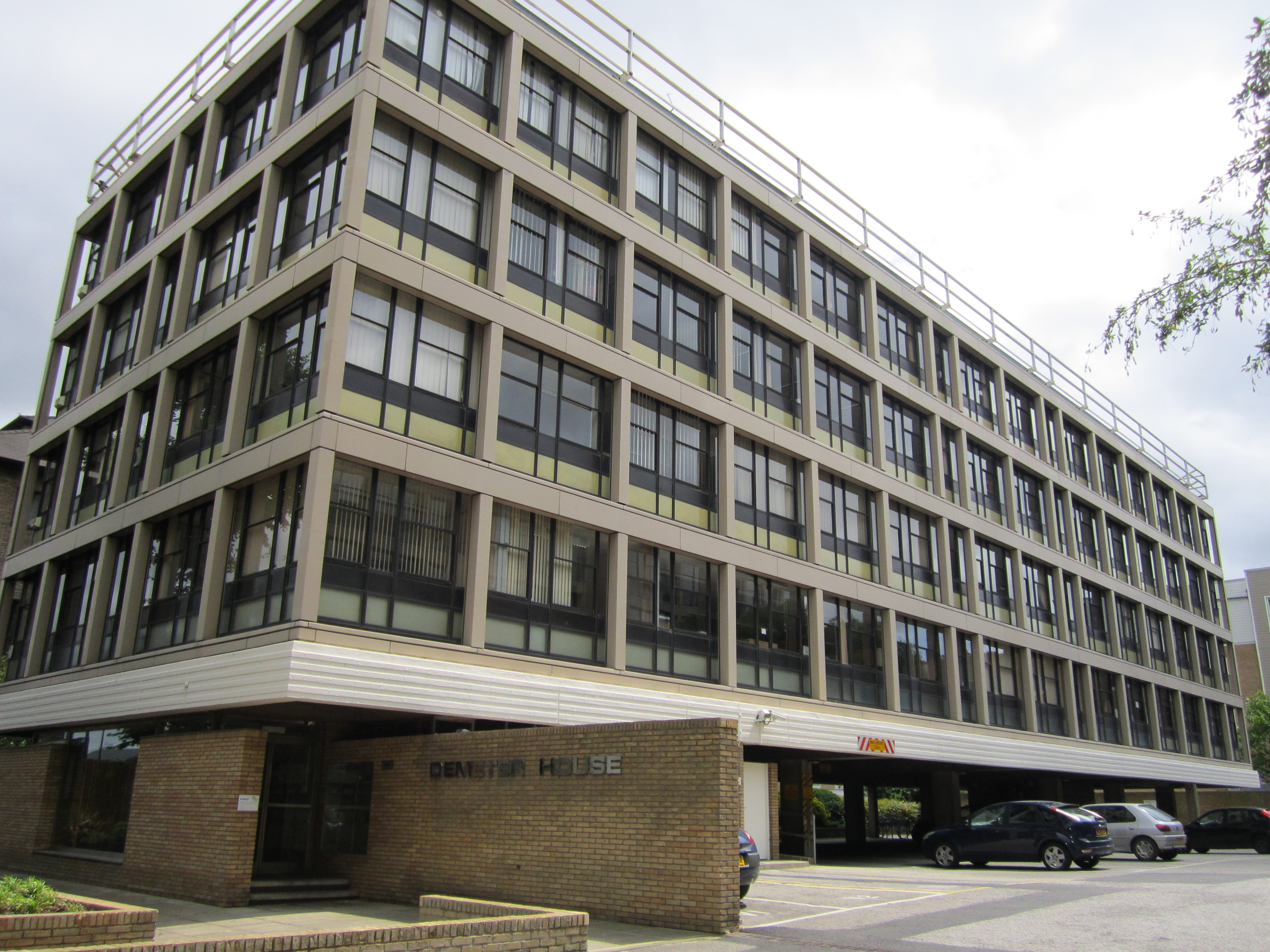
Demeter House

Demeter House, on Station Road, was built in the 1960s. It is one of three similar office blocks, the others being 20 Station Road (formerly Leda House), and Jupiter House. The building is currently one of the principal offices for Mott MacDonald.

=== Railway station ===
The railway station opened in 1845 when the Eastern Counties Railway opened to Cambridge. The station building has a long classical façade and porte-cochère, which was infilled during the 20th century. It has been attributed to both Sancton Wood and Francis Thompson and is listed Grade II.

The single very long platform is typical of its period but now unusual in that, apart from a brief period in the mid-19th century, it was never supplemented by another through platform. There were major platform lengthenings and remodellings of the main building in 1863 and 1908. The station layout was altered in 1896 through changes to the Newmarket line approaches.

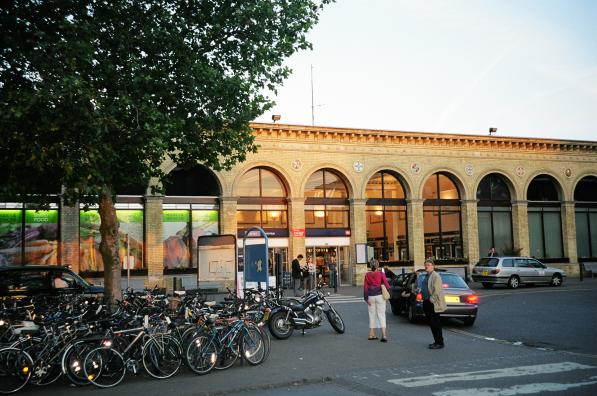
Cambridge railway station and bicycle stands at the eastern end of Station Road.

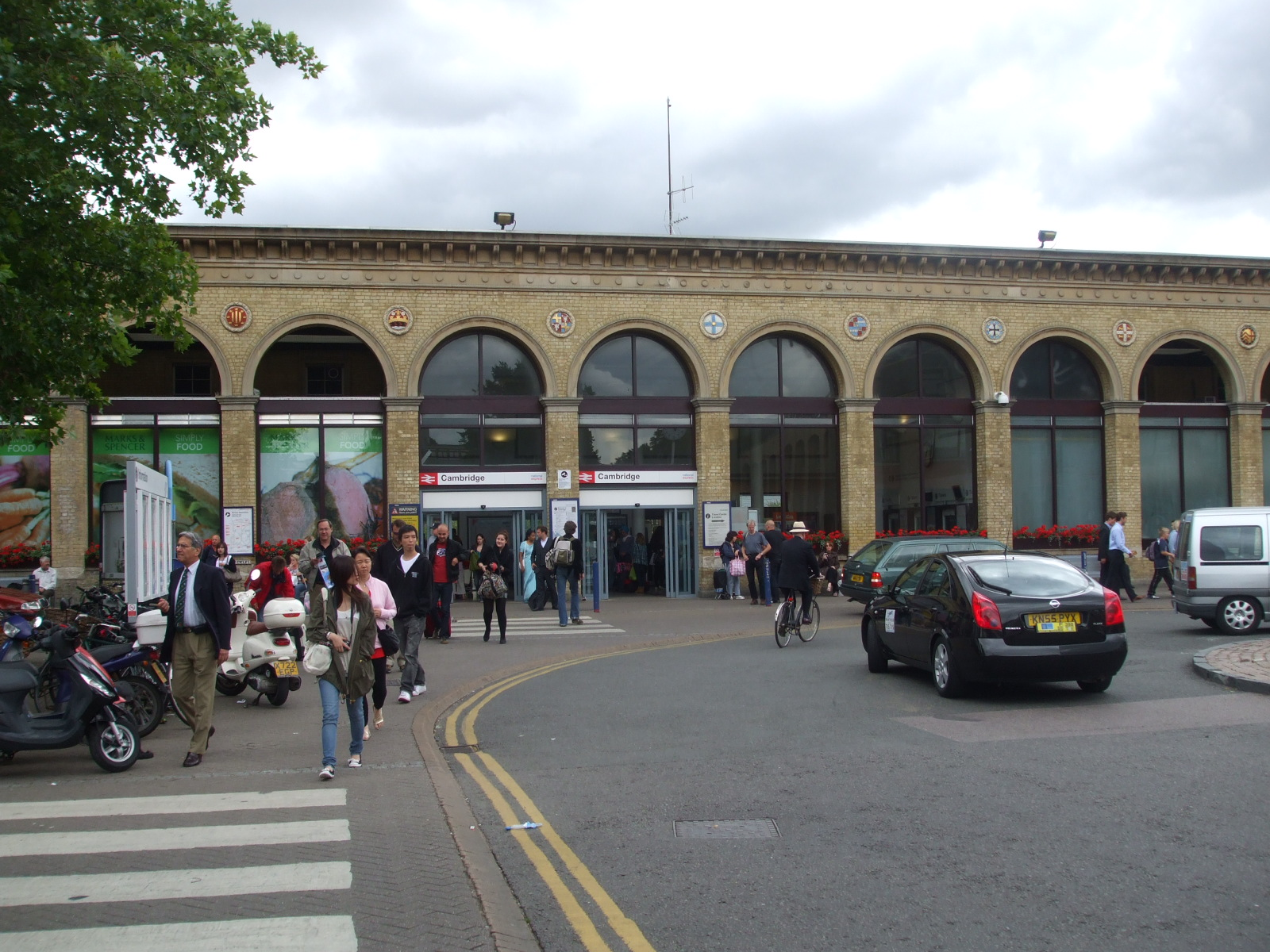
General view of the entrance to the railway station at the end of Station Road.

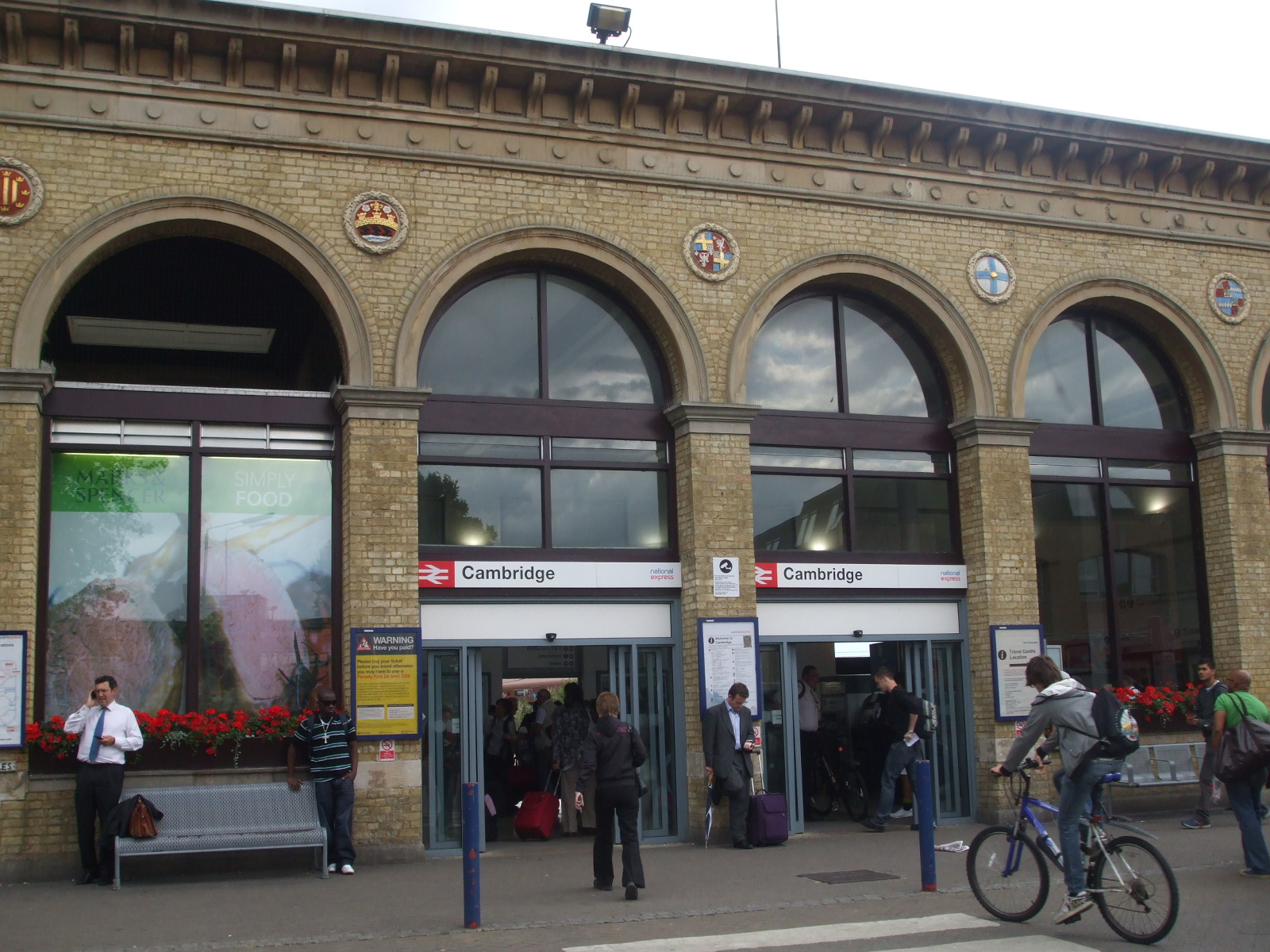
Entrance to the railway station.

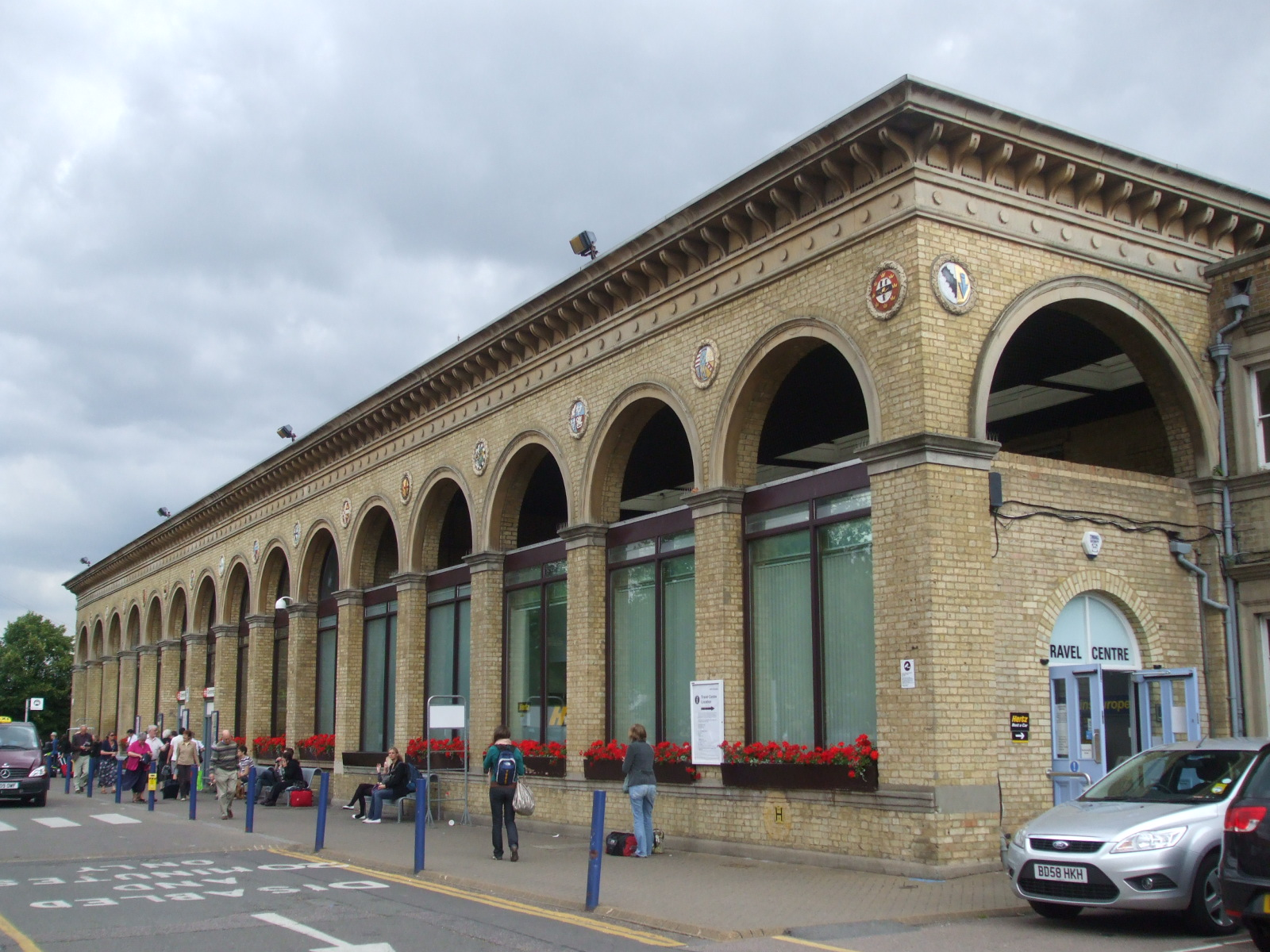
View of the railway station building.
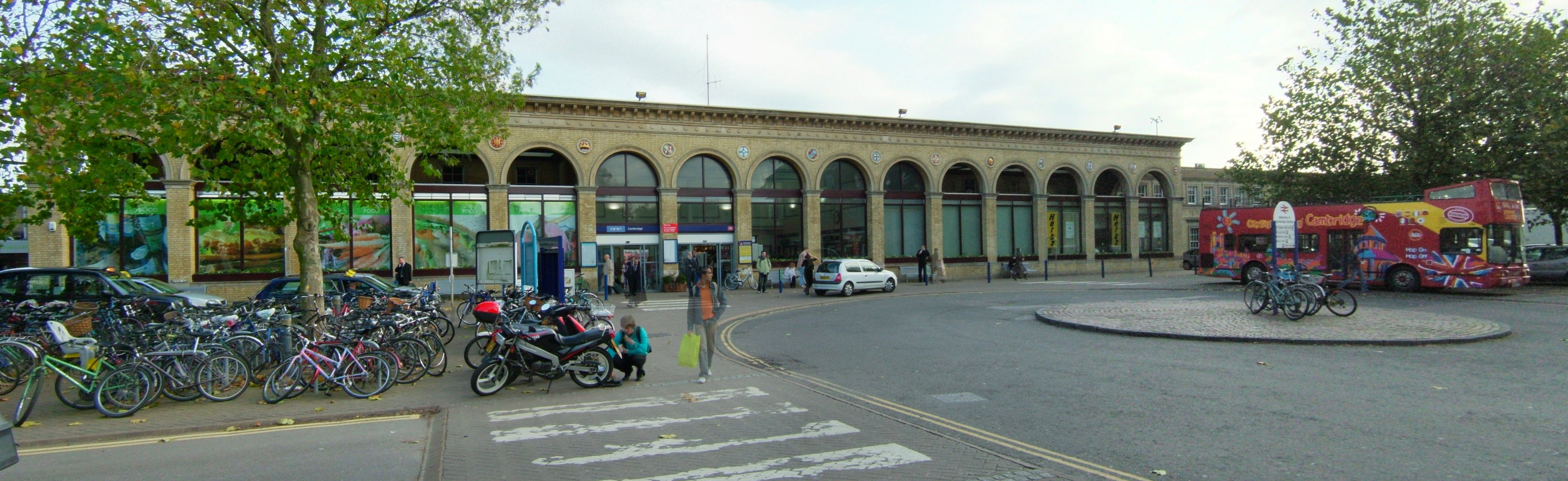
View of the railway station at the end of Station Road.
