= Away with the learning of clerks, away with it! =

Slogan of the 1381 Peasants' Revolt

"Away with the learning of clerks, away with it!" was a rallying cry of rebellious townspeople in Cambridge during the Peasants' Revolt of 1381. The rebels sacked university and official buildings and burnt legal documents and charters. The call is usually ascribed to Margery (sometimes Margaret) Starre.

The story of this woman's violence against texts is not unknown—it has been noted several times in major studies of the revolt—but its significance as part of the much larger story of women in 1381 has been overlooked. (Note: Federico notes that there are many subsequent legal appearances of women, "in the judicial records, chronicles, and poetry produced in the decade following the revolt. These texts depict women as independent leaders and maintainers of rebel bands, as instigators of others' violence, and as accomplices with their family members in criminal acts".)

— Sylvia Federico

== The Peasants' Revolt in Cambridge ==
On 15 June 1381, revolt broke out in Cambridgeshire, led by a gang from Suffolk and local men who had been involved in the London riots and had returned to spread unrest. The University of Cambridge was staffed by priests and enjoyed special royal privileges, which bred resentment among the lay inhabitants of the town. The Mayor of Cambridge led the rebellion and one of the first major incidents was against the university. Great St Mary's Church was entered and bulls, charters and title deeds of the university were destroyed. The university's library and archives were burnt in the centre of the town. The historian Barrie Dobson has noted the popularity of burning charters, "records and writings in the house of justice" and other legal records during the Peasants' Revolt. The university was unpopular in Cambridge because it took a heavy-handed role in the town's policing, and because its scholars received benefit of clergy which effectively exempted them from lay courts.

Corpus Christi College was sacked on 15 June by a mob of townspeople (and apparently some students) led by the mayor which, according to the college, carried away its plate as well as its charter to be burned while gutting the rest of the college buildings. A number of chests containing the college's muniments were removed. Corpus was the only university college, although not the only university building, to be attacked. The revolt focused on the college as centre of discontent due to its rigid collection of "candle rents" or rent charges assessed upon houses in its ownership, according to the number of wax tapers. Corpus had close links with John of Gaunt. (Note: Gaunt's London home, the Savoy Palace, had been one of the London rebels' first targets a few days previously; it had been ransacked and razed to the ground.) The college later claimed £80 (roughly £50,000 in modern terms) in damages.

On 16 June, the mob destroyed university documents (Note: described in accounts of the time as the "statutes and ordinances" of the university, although many such documents from prior to this event survive) on a bonfire in Market Square. (Note: Firth-Green gives other examples of the rebels' interest in seeking out official documents for destruction, such as at St Albans Abbey, where they particularly sought what was described as "a certain ancient charter...on which there were capital letters, one gold, the other blue".) In what Juliet Barker has described as one of the more picaresque moments of the revolt, Starre scattered the ashes to the four winds, crying out "away with the learning of clerks, away with it!" as she did so, dancing triumphantly with the mob.

Starre may not have been averse to literacy itself, suggests the Chaucerian Susanne Sara Thomas, as much as the oppressive bonds charters represented, and they may have been more generally a symbol of "the establishment". The historian Edmund King has suggested that the episode illustrates that Starre and her cohorts did not realise "how little learning is to be found in most official university documents", while the medievalist Alastair Dunn has questioned whether the tale of Margery Starre's may, in fact, be the stuff of legend. In any case, although part of what Barker has called a "summer of blood" and "a general riot of destruction and death", Starre destroyed property but did not kill anyone, although a later attempt was made on the life of the University bedel. Starre achieved, said Dan Jones, a "brief notoriety" even at a time of general notoriety, and that her "spirit of jubilant vandalism" pervaded the entire city.

Starre is generally described as an "old woman", and she has been characterised as a beldam.

== In medieval culture ==
Thomas has suggested that Starre was something of a precursor to Geoffrey Chaucer's character The Wife of Bath of The Canterbury Tales (c. 1387–1400), who rips pages out of her husband's book and then later makes him burn it, while Dorothy Colmer has suggested that she reflects the "political dissatisfactions of the age" as represented by Starre in 1381. Thomas Shippey has drawn comparisons with Shakespeare's followers of Jack Cade, in Henry VI, Part 3, and their exhortation "Let's kill all the lawyers".

== See also ==
- Town and gown
- John Cavendish
