= C J Townrow & Sons =

Department store chain in Essex, England

C J Townrow & Sons are a small chain of department stores based in Essex.

The business opened during 1871 and is still run by the same family.

The business sells menswear, womenswear, shoes, kitchenware and linens.

It was originally based in Braintree, which closed in 2017, but continues to operate with smaller branches in Maldon, Essex Frinton-on-Sea, Essex and St Ives, Cambridgeshire, which was purchased from the administrators of another department store chain Eaden Lilley. In 2020 they purchased the homeware store of closing department store Winch & Blatch in Sudbury. There were previously branches in Culver Street in Colchester, and High Street in Halstead.
