= Holy Trinity Church, Cambridge =

Holy Trinity
- Holy Trinity Church
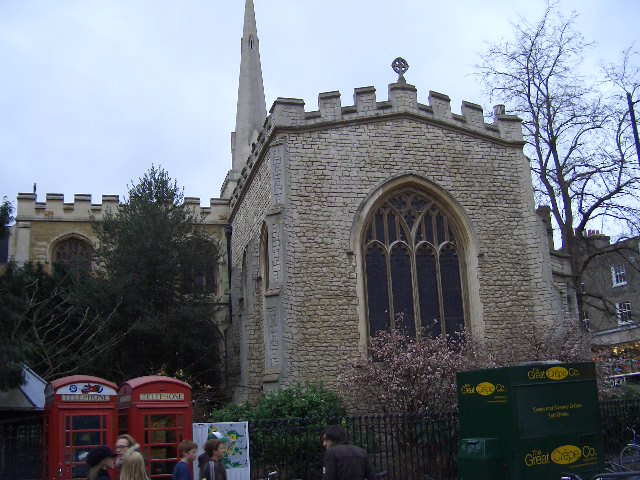
- Holy Trinity Church from Sidney Street
- Holy Trinity
- 52.2059°N 0.1203°E
- Location: Market Street, Cambridge, Cambridgeshire, CB2 3NZ
- Country: England
- Denomination: Church of England
- Churchmanship: Charismatic Evangelical
- Website: www.htcambridge.org.uk

Architecture
- Style: Perpendicular Gothic
- Years built: c.1400

Administration
- Diocese: Diocese of Ely

Clergy
- Vicar: The Revd Stuart Browning

Holy Trinity Church is an Anglican church in Cambridge, England. It is located on Market Street, on the corner with Sidney Street. Its current vicar is Stuart Browning. Theologically, it stands within the charismatic evangelical tradition of the Church of England.

== History ==
The first Holy Trinity Church in Cambridge was next to the old Roman road and was just a small thatched timber building. This church burnt down in 1174. In 1189, a new stone church was begun. The stonework of the west wall under the tower is all that remains from the church of this time.

By around 1350, money was raised to widen the nave and add two aisles. In about 1348, a steeple was added to the tower. Around 1400, two transepts were constructed in the Perpendicular style. During the English Reformation (1550–1750), Holy Trinity Church developed further. In 1616, a gallery was erected along the north side of the nave for the increased size of the congregation.

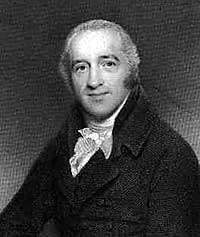
Charles Simeon (1759–1836), vicar of Holy Trinity Church.

From 1782 to 1836, Holy Trinity Church was at the centre of spiritual life in Cambridge. The ministry of Charles Simeon (1759–1836) started when he was appointed vicar by the Bishop of Ely against the wishes of the churchwardens and congregation at the time who disliked his evangelicalism. In 1794, Simeon introduced a barrel organ with sixty hymn tunes into the church. Apart from the repair to the lower section of the steeple in 1824 and painting and varnishing inside the church, Simeon made no structural alterations until 1834. Then the small chancel with 14th century ribbed vaulting was demolished and replaced with the current much larger extension, constructed of brick and plaster. These changes were made without an architect. Simeon was also one of the founders of the Church Missionary Society in 1799.

The church continued to flourish with its evangelistic reputation during Victorian times. In 1887, the chancel was finished in stone, the pews were replaced, choir stalls added and most of the galleries removed. In the same year, the Henry Martyn Memorial Hall was built next to the church as a centre for Christian undergraduates at the University of Cambridge. From 1873 to 1889, there were about 140 offers to the Church Missionary Society. In 1885, the Cambridge Seven went to China, inspiring other Christian missionaries.

=== Present day ===
Holy Trinity Cambridge stands in the charismatic evangelical tradition of the Church of England. The church subscribes to the Church of England Evangelical Council's basis of faith, and in its 2020 Parish Profile called for the new vicar to "uphold orthodox biblical standards on ethical issues such as same-sex relationships".

== Notable people ==
- Peter Ackroyd, Biblical scholar, was an honorary curate here from 1957 to 1961
- Charles Clayton, vicar at Holy Trinity from 1851 to 1865
- Thomas Rawson Birks, vicar from 1866 to 1877
- Max Warren, vicar from 1936 to 1942
- Thomas Goodwin, vicar from 1632 to 1633

== Gallery ==
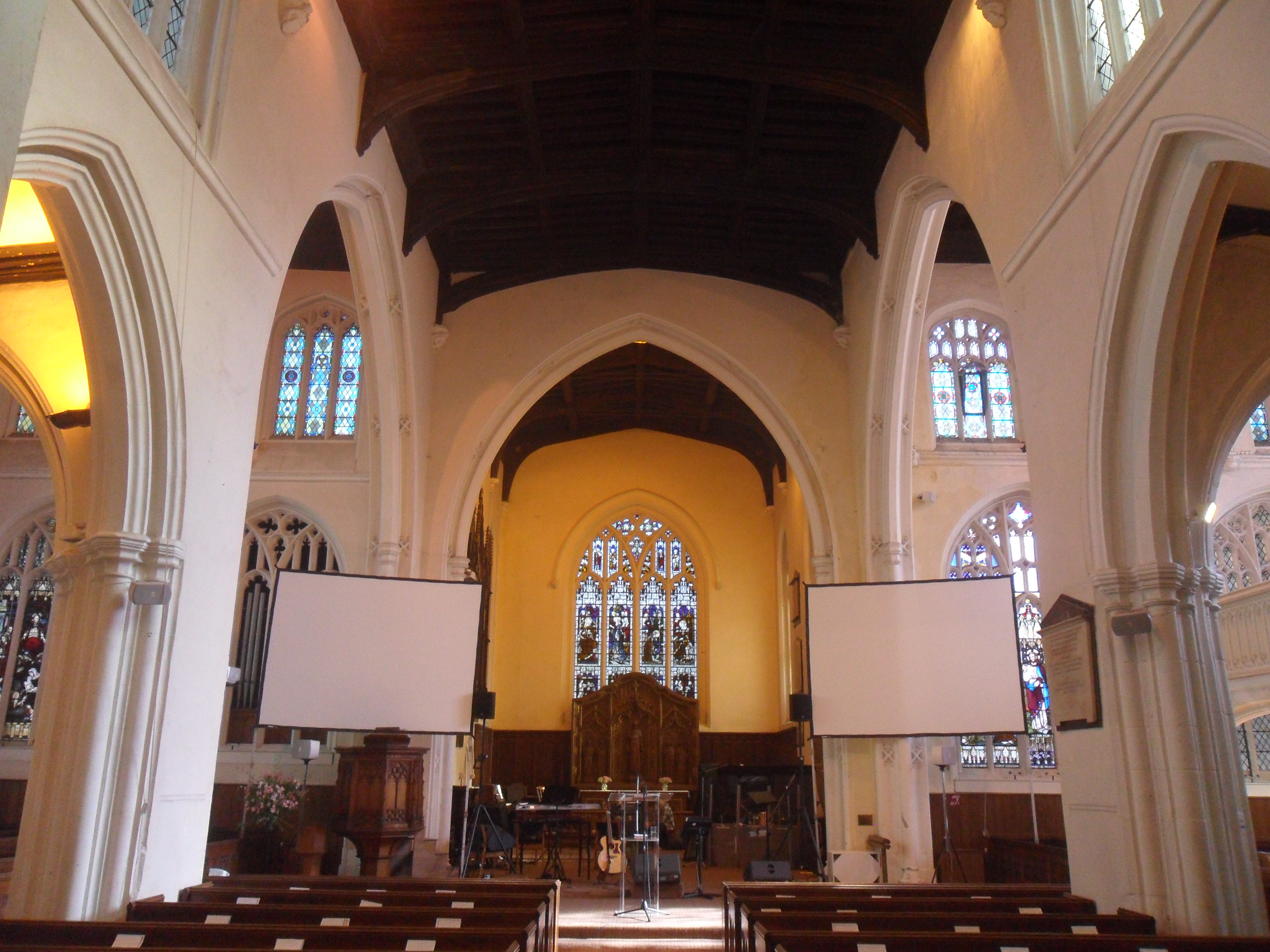
Interior Of Holy Trinity in 2012

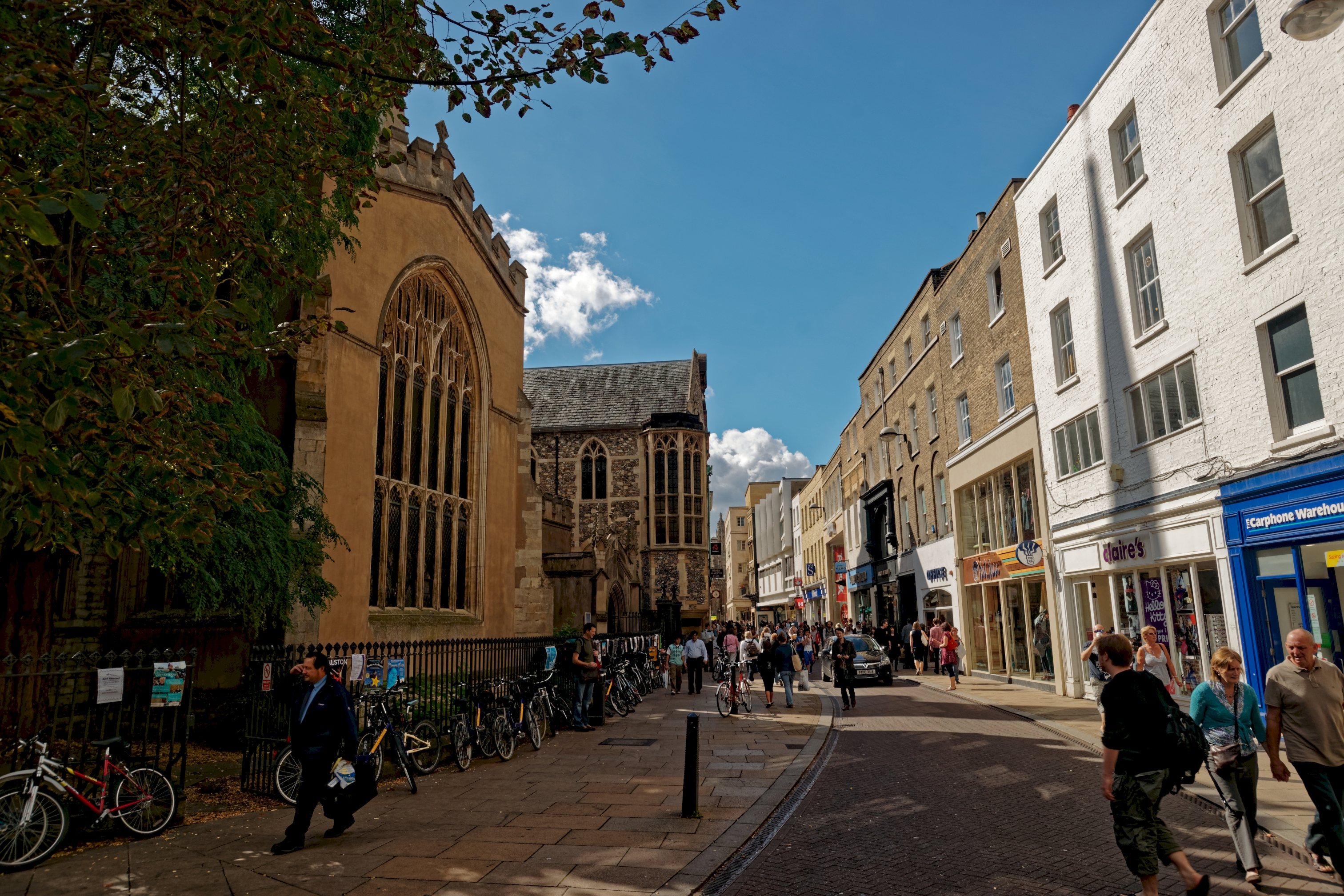
Church from Sidney Street, Cambridge

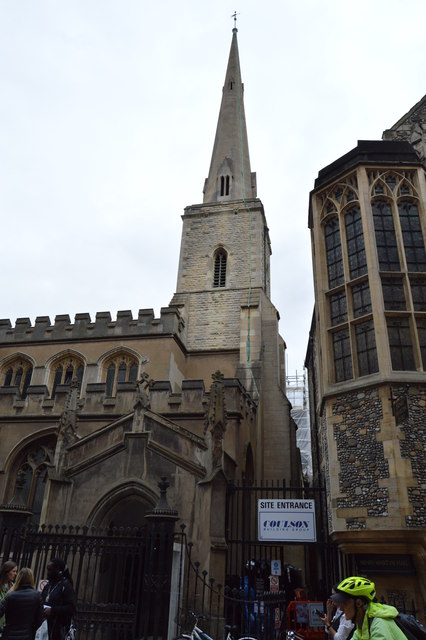
Church entrance on Market Street, Cambridge

== See also ==
- Church of St Mary the Great, the University Church on Senate House Hill to the west
