= Market Street, Cambridge =

Street in Cambridge, England

Coordinates: 52°12′22″N 0°07′11″E

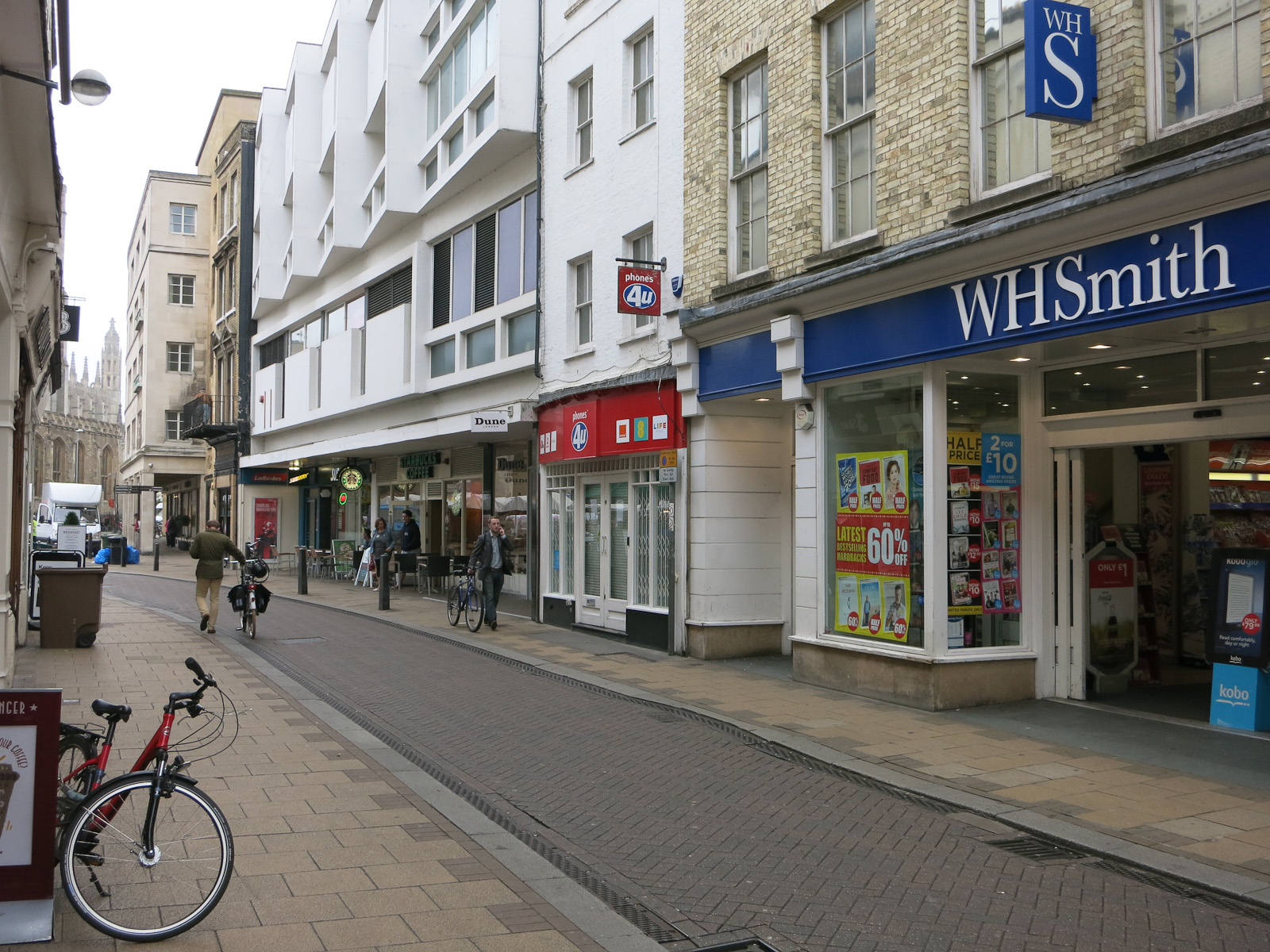
Market Street, Cambridge

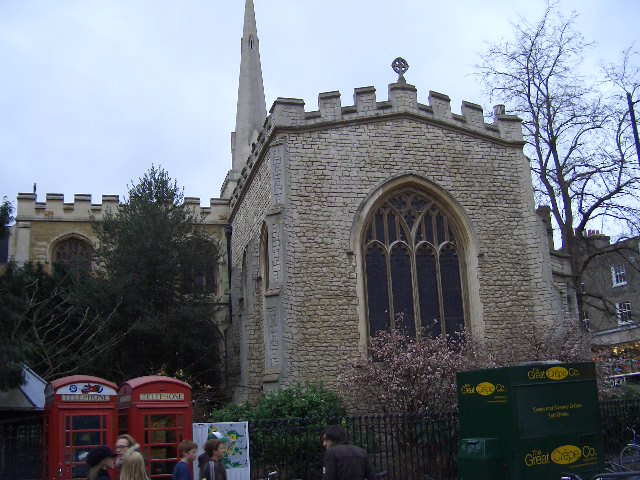
Holy Trinity Church on the corner of Market Street and Sidney Street

Market Street is a shopping street in central Cambridge, England. It runs between Market Hill, location of the city's central Market Square to the west and Sidney Street to the east. On the other side of the market square, the street continues west as St Mary's Street, north of Great St Mary's, the University church. On the other side of Sidney Street is Hobson's Passage leading east to Hobson Street. To the north is Market Passage and to the south is Petty Cury, a pedestrianised shopping street.

== Buildings ==
Holy Trinity Church, built c1400 in the Perpendicular style, is at the eastern end of the street on the south corner with Sidney Street.

Henry Martyn Hall is a building named after the priest and missionary Henry Martyn. It was designed by the Arts and Crafts architect Edward Schroeder Prior (1857–1932, a pupil of Norman Shaw), and built in 1885–87. The ground floor has been converted for commercial use.

Radcliffe Court, a set of residential apartments above a series of ground floor shops overlooking Market Square, was completed in 1964 to a design of the architect Stanley R. Nevell & Partners.
