= Petty Cury =

Street in Cambridge, UK

Coordinates: 52.2052°N 0.1205°E

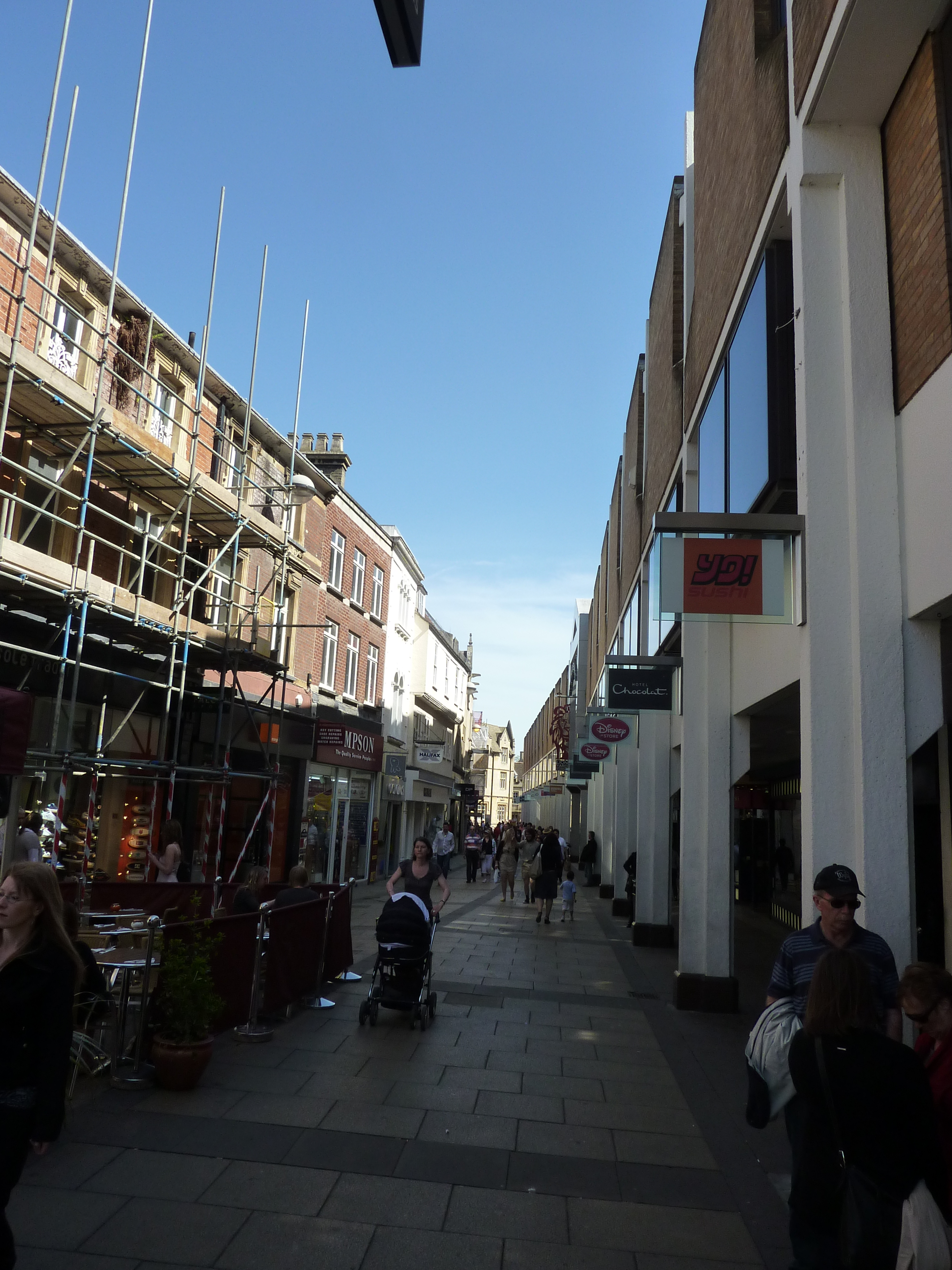
Petty Cury.

Petty Cury is a pedestrianised shopping street in central Cambridge, England. It connects Market Hill, the location of Cambridge's central outdoor market, and Guildhall Street to the west with the shopping streets of Sidney Street and St Andrew's Street to the east. Hobson Street leads off north on the opposite side of the street at the eastern end, on the corner of Christ's College, one of the historic University of Cambridge colleges.

== History ==
Petty Cury is an old street that first appeared in documents around 1330. and appears as Petycure, the residence of Thomas Furbisshour and his wife Agnes, in 1396. The unusual name most likely derives from petit (meaning "little") and cury (meaning "cooks' row"). Originally there were a number of bakers' stalls here. The derivation is mentioned in the Diary of Samuel Pepys, who had been a student at Magdalene College, Cambridge.

From the 15th century, there were inns on this street, with yards behind. These became some of Cambridge's worst slums in the 19th century. For example, up to 300 people may have inhabited the Falcon Yard, which was demolished on the order of the Medical Officer of Health in 1903.

In the 1960s, the entire south side was demolished to make way for the building of the Lion Yard shopping centre.
