= Sussex Street, Cambridge =

Pedestranised street in Cambridge, England

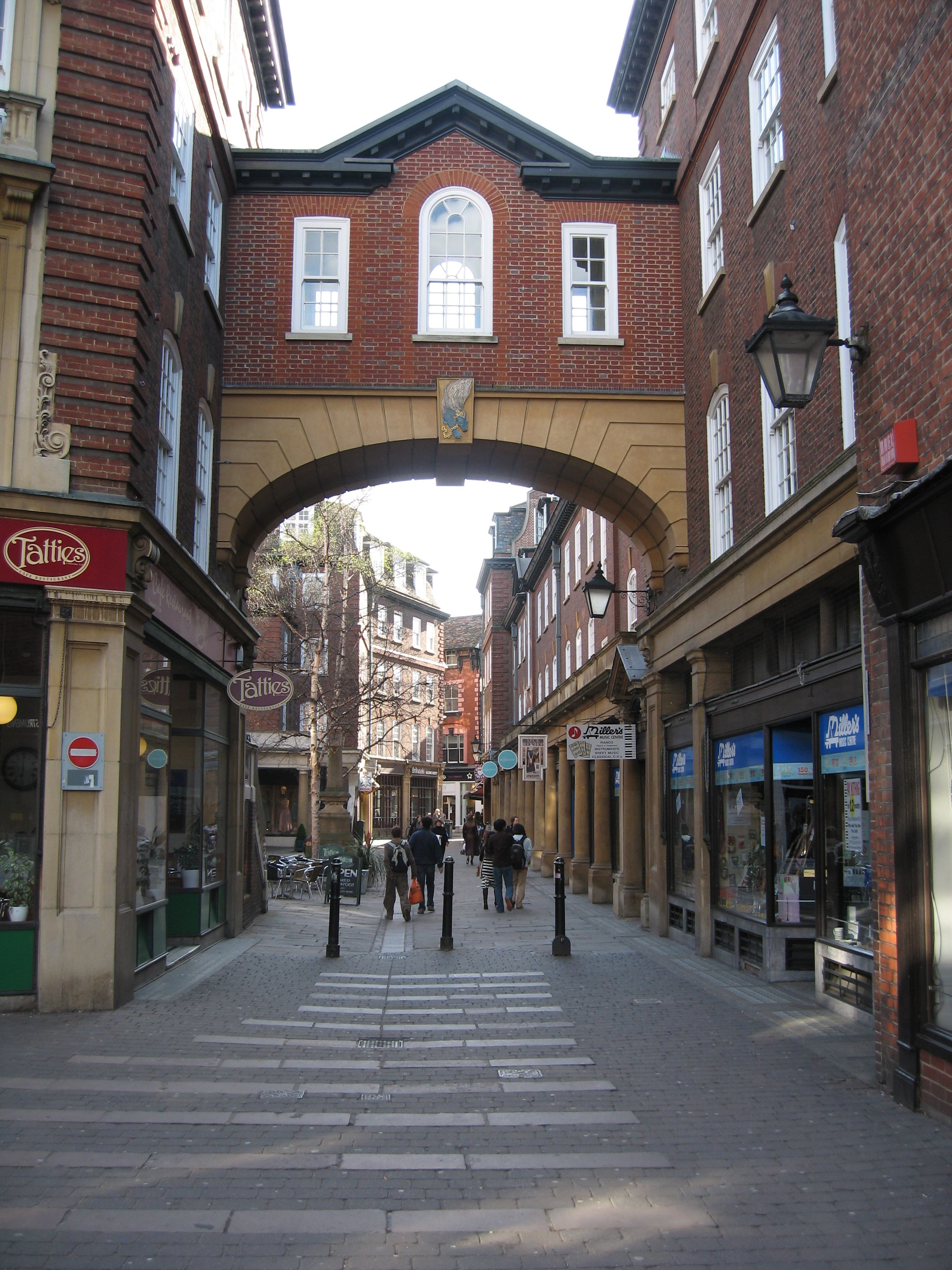
- View southwest from the junction of King Street and Hobson Street down Sussex Street towards Sidney Street at the far end.
- Location: Cambridge, England
- Coordinates: 52°12′24″N 0°07′15″E

Sussex Street is a pedestranised shopping street in central Cambridge, England. It runs between Sidney Street to the southwest and the junction of King Street and Hobson Street to the northeast.

== History ==
The street was designed in the 1920s and 1930s. It is in the neo-Georgian style and was described by the architectural historian Sir Nikolaus Pevsner as the "best piece of pre-war urban planning at Cambridge." The original line of the street dates back to at least the Medieval era. However, the buildings on the street today were planned as a mixed-use development for Sidney Sussex College and built during 1928–39, just before World War II.

To the north of the street is the University of Cambridge college Sidney Sussex College, fronting onto Sidney Street. To the south and parallel with the street is Hobson's Passage. On the corner with Sidney Street is the tall and distinctive Grade II listed Montagu House. There is a covered bridge linking the two sides of the street.

== See also ==
- Ginn & Co Solicitors
