= Church of St Mary the Great, Cambridge =

Great St Mary's
- Church of St Mary the Great
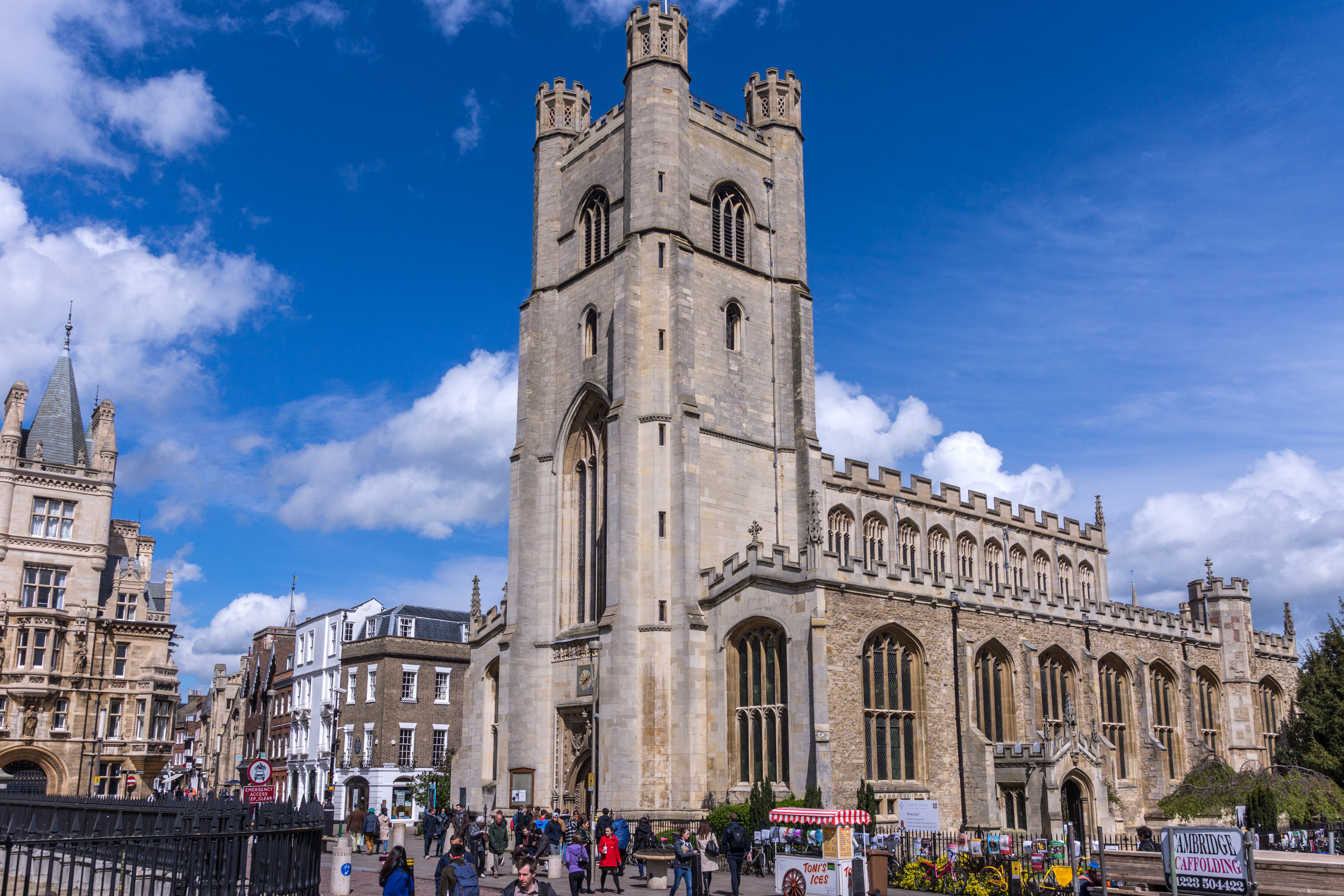
- Church of St Mary the Great

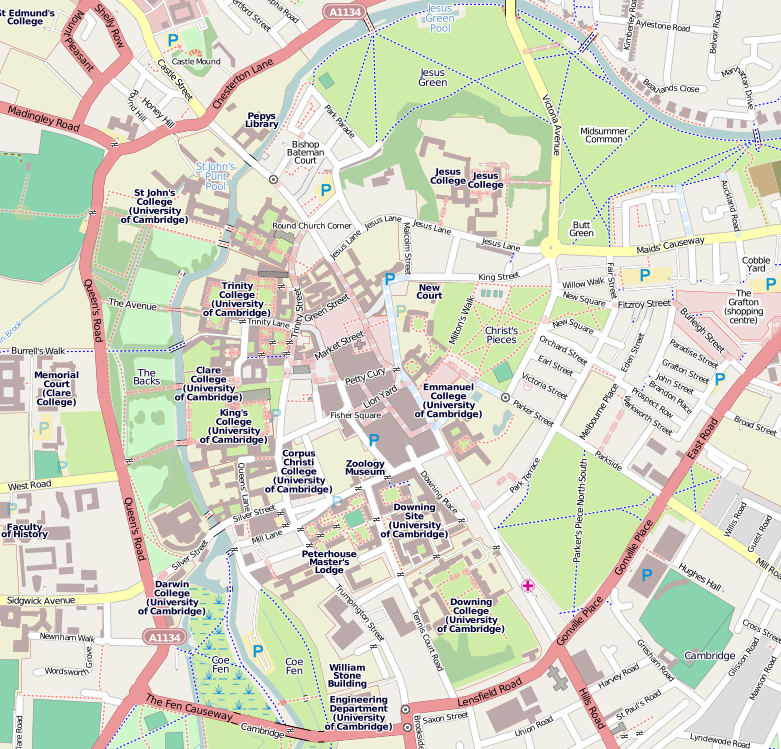
- Location in central Cambridge
- 52°12′19″N 0°07′06″E
- OS grid reference: TL 44846 58460
- Location: Great St Mary's, The University Church, Senate House Hill, Cambridge, CB2 3PQ
- Country: England
- Denomination: Church of England
- Previous denomination: Roman Catholic
- Churchmanship: Liberal Catholic
- Website: www.greatstmarys.org

Architecture
- Style: Late Perpendicular Gothic
- Years built: 1478–1519

Administration
- Diocese: Ely
- Archdeaconry: Cambridge
- Deanery: Cambridge North
- Parish: St. Mary The Great with St. Michael, Cambridge

Clergy
- Vicar: Jutta Brueck

St Mary the Great is a Church of England parish and university church at the north end of King's Parade in central Cambridge, England. It is known locally as Great St Mary's or simply GSM to distinguish it from "Little St Mary's". It is one of the Greater Churches. It is designated by Historic England as a Grade I listed building.

In addition to being a parish church in the Diocese of Ely, it is the university church for the University of Cambridge. As such it has a role in the university's legislation. For example, university officers must live within 20 miles of Great St Mary's and undergraduates within three. The church also hosts the "University Sermons" and houses the University Organ and the University Clock. The latter chimes the "Cambridge Quarters" which were later used by the clock tower of the Houses of Parliament ("Big Ben").

== History ==
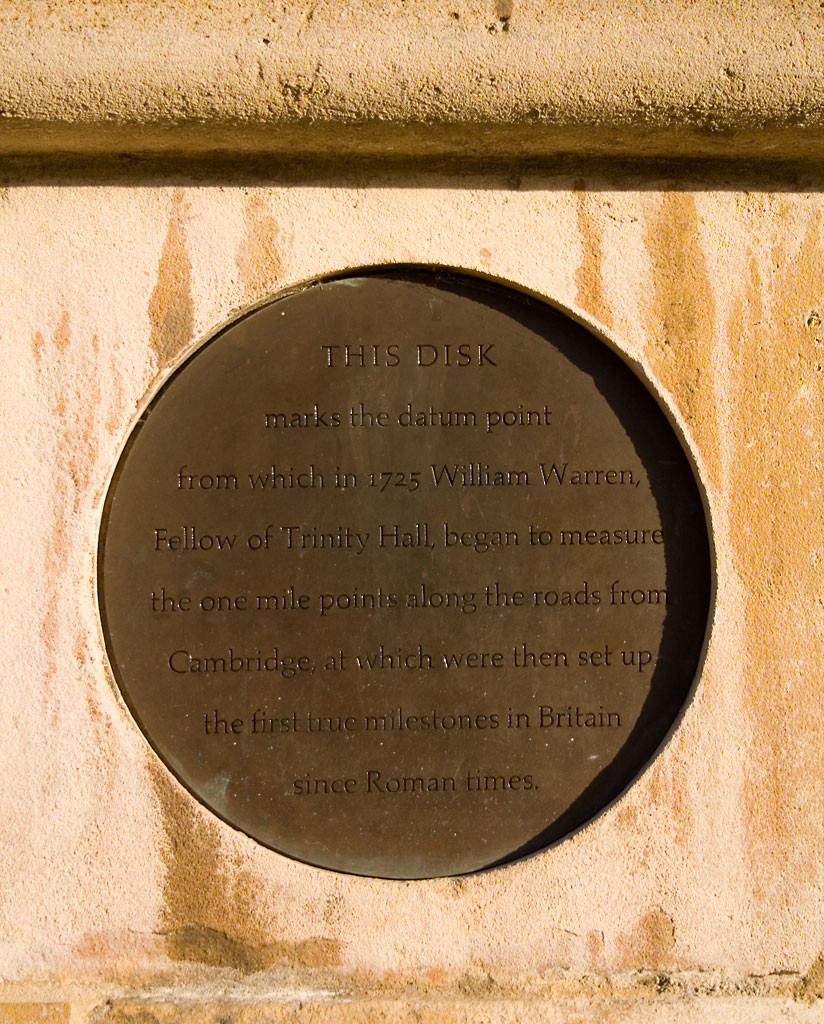
A plaque at the base of the west tower marks the datum point for distances from Cambridge, which were originally marked with the first milestones erected in Britain since the Romans

The first mention of the church is a record of King John presenting Thomas de Chimeleye to the rectory in 1205. The foundations of the church may date to 1010, but the church was mostly destroyed by fire 9 July 1290 and then rebuilt. At the time, this fire was attributed to the Jewish population of the city, with the result that the synagogue was closed. Prior to 1352, it was known as The Church of St Mary the Virgin, but since that year has become known by its modern name. During its early years, the patronage of the church (that is, the right to name the incumbent) belonged to the crown, but on 15 July 1342, the patronage was passed to King's Hall. When King's Hall was subsumed by Henry VIII into Trinity College the patronage of the University Church also passed to Trinity, where it has rested since.

The orders for the consecration of the new church were sent out on 17 May 1346, but were not enacted until 15 March 1351.

During the Peasants' Revolt and associated sacking of the university by townspeople in 1381, the church was entered and bulls, charters and title deeds of the university were destroyed.

In the Middle Ages it became an official gathering place for meetings and debates for Cambridge University, but this ceased in 1730 when the University's Senate House was built across the street.

The present building was constructed between 1478 and 1519, with the tower finished later, in 1608. The cost of construction was covered largely by Richard III and Henry VII.

The church was restored by James Essex in 1766. In 1850–51 a restoration was carried out by George Gilbert Scott, followed by further work by Anthony Salvin in 1857. The south porch was rebuilt in 1888. There has been some more restoration work during the 20th century.

Various leading philosophers of the English Reformation preached there, notably Erasmus. Martin Bucer, who influenced Thomas Cranmer's writing of the Book of Common Prayer, was buried there. Under Queen Mary I, Bucer's corpse was burnt in the marketplace, but under Elizabeth I, the dust from the place of burning was replaced in the church and now lies under a brass floor plate in the south chancel.

=== Present day ===
Great St Mary's stands in the Liberal Catholic tradition of the Church of England. It is a member of Inclusive Church.

== Architecture and features ==
The church is designed in the Late Perpendicular style. The stained glass is the work of Hardman and was added between 1867 and 1869.

To accommodate the large audiences that were present for special occasions, and in particular the University Sermon, attendance of which was compulsory, the galleries were added in 1735. The church contains one of the few moveable pulpits in England. The font dates from 1632 and the sculpture behind the high altar is of Christ in Majesty. This sculpture was completed in 1960. The sculpture is by Alan Durst.

=== Bells ===
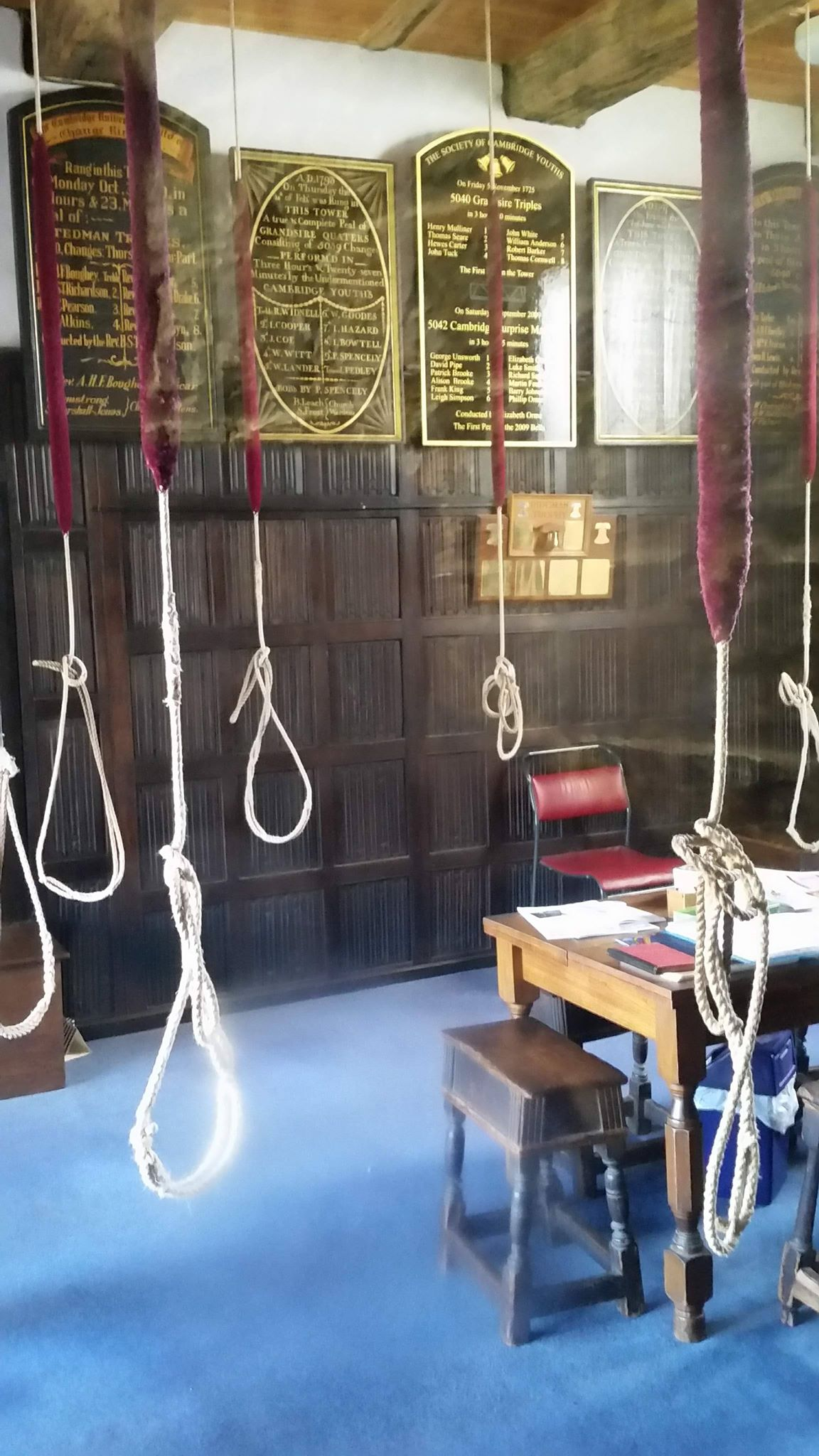
Bell-ringing room in the tower

Originally, bells were hung in a wooden structure in the churchyard. In 1515, the bells were moved to the tower, and the structure was dismantled. The bells were replaced in 1722, and in 1724, the Society of Cambridge Youths was formed to formalise the responsibility for ringing them. This society lays claim to being the oldest bellringing society in Britain and the second oldest at any church in the world with a continuous ringing history.

In 2009 the old ring of bells was replaced with a new ring cast by Taylors Eayre and Smith Ltd, made possible by a donation from Dr Martin C Faulkes. The new ring of 13 bells in the key of D (including a flat bell no. 6 providing a lighter ring of 8 bells in the key of G) has a tenor weighing 24cwt. Some of the original bells have been retained to continue sounding the Cambridge Chimes.

=== Organs ===
St Mary the Great is unusual in housing two self-contained pipe organs, a 'Parish Organ' in the Chancel for the regular congregation, and another in the West Gallery, called the 'University Organ', owned and maintained by the University, and played for University services. The University Organ was originally purchased in 1698, constructed by the renowned organ builder 'Father' Bernard Smith. It was added over the 18th and 19th centuries until a major (yet sensitive) rebuild was carried out by William Hill in 1870. The organ saw further work in 1963 from Hill, Norman and Beard (again remarkably sensitive for the time) and was extensively restored in 1995 by Mander Organs, and rededicated on 30 January 1996. It is a noted historic instrument, a significant monument to the work of William Hill, and, in addition, likely the largest repository of Father Smith pipework in a single instrument. The Parish Organ was built in 1991/2 by Kenneth Jones and Associates. It replaced an earlier instrument by Miller of Cambridge (one time organist of Great St Mary's) dating from 1869.

== List of vicars ==
- Henry Luard (1860-1887)
- William Cunningham(1887-)
- Robert Abbott(1913-); later Bishop of Sherborne
- Philip Waggett (1927–1930)
- E. C. Essex (1930-)
- G. E. A. Whitworth (1947-)
- Mervyn Stockwood (1955–1959); afterwards Bishop of Southwark
- Joseph Fison (1959–1963); afterwards Bishop of Salisbury
- Hugh Montefiore (1963–1970); afterwards Bishop of Kingston, then of Birmingham
- Stanley Booth-Clibborn (1973–1979); afterwards Bishop of Manchester
- Michael Mayne (1979–1986); later Dean of Westminster
- David Conner (1986–1993); afterwards Bishop of Lynn, then Dean of Windsor
- John Binns (1994–2017)
- Adrian Daffern (2018–2022)
- Jutta Brueck (2023–) [Interim Priest-in-Charge from 2022, Vicar from 2023]

== Burials and funerals ==
- Martin Bucer (1491–1551), Protestant reformer
- Stephen Hawking (1942–2018), theoretical physicist, funeral held on 31 March 2018 prior to his cremation and interring of his ashes in Westminster Abbey
- Jack Merritt (1994–2019), prison educator and mentor, funeral held on 20 December 2019 prior to his cremation

== Gallery ==
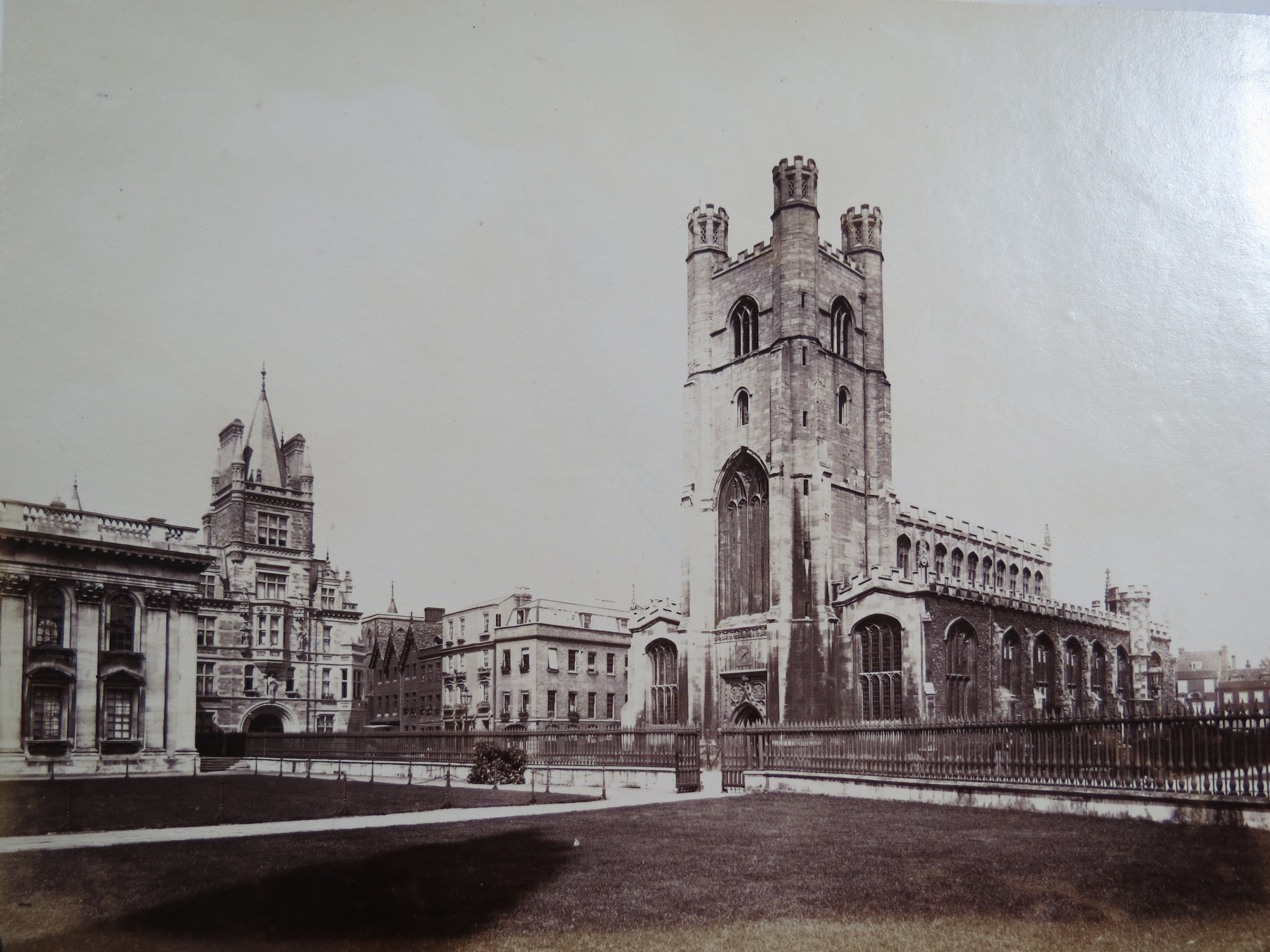
Cambridge University, Great St. Mary's Church (photograph c. 1870)

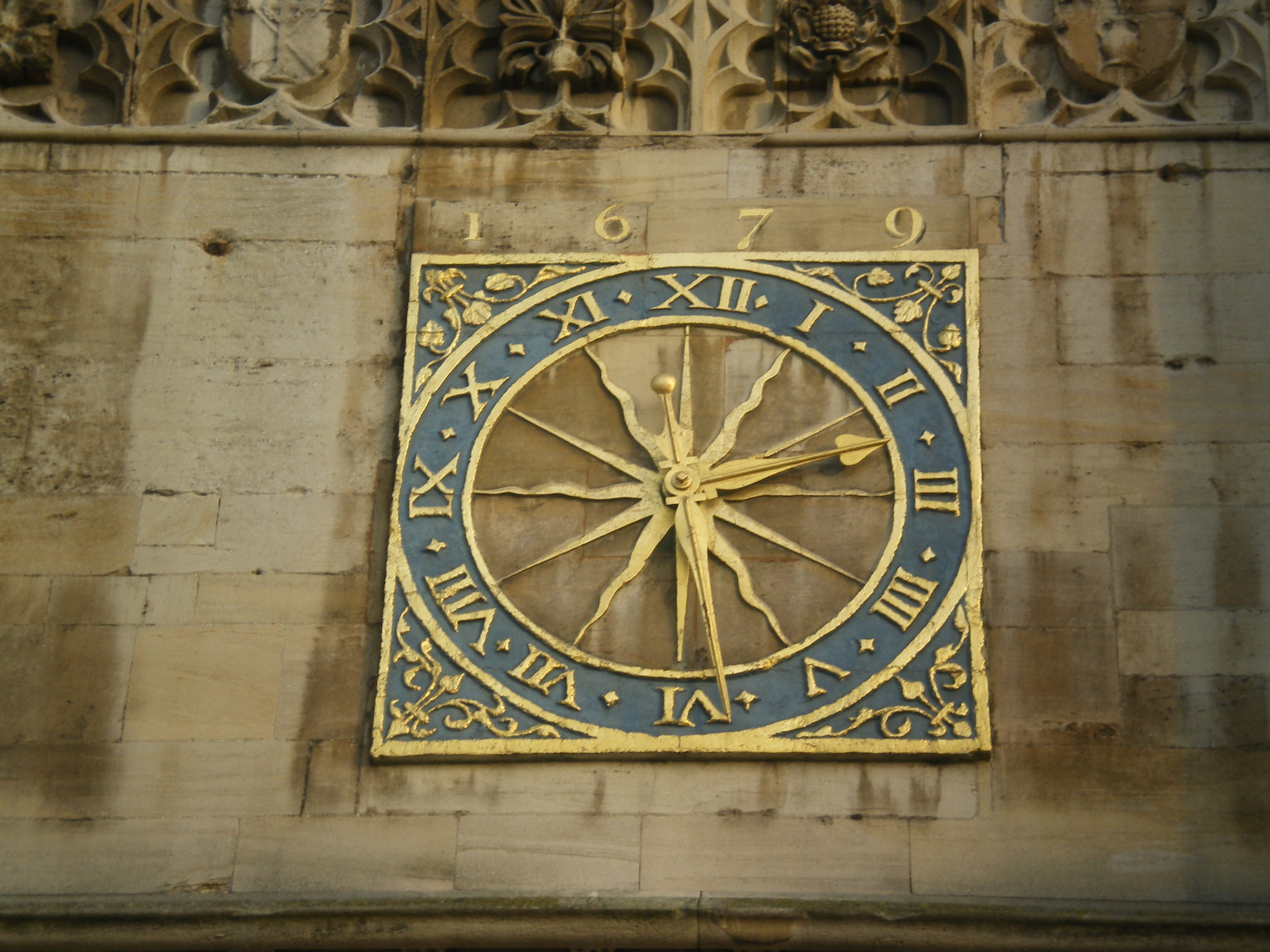
The Cambridge University Clock, set above the West door of Great St Mary's

== See also ==
- List of church restorations and alterations by Anthony Salvin
- Holy Trinity Church in Market Street to the east
