= Jones Nash =

English cricketer (1812–1877)

Personal information
- Full name: Jones Gifford Nash
- Born: 22 January 1812; Bishop's Stortford, Hertfordshire, England
- Died: 19 April 1877 (aged 65); Kentish Town, London, England
- Batting: Unknown
- Bowling: Unknown-arm underarm slow

Career statistics
Competition	First-class
Matches	6
Runs scored	31
Batting average	5.16
100s/50s	–/–
Top score	16
Balls bowled	311
Wickets	34
Bowling average	17.50
5 wickets in innings	2
10 wickets in match	1
Best bowling	6/?
Catches/stumpings	5/–
- Source: Cricinfo, 2 August 2019

Jones Gifford Nash (22 January 1812 – 19 April 1877) was an English first-class cricketer.

Nash made his debut in first-class cricket for the Gentlemen of England against the Gentlemen of Kent at Canterbury in 1847. He made five further first-class appearances for the Gentlemen of England from 1848 to 1853, all against the Gentlemen of Kent. Playing as a slow underarm bowler, Nash took 34 wickets at an average of 17.50. He took five wickets in an innings on two occasions and took ten wickets in a match once. By profession he was a brewer, wine and spirits merchant and was a partner in the business Hawkes, Nash, and Co. He died at Kentish Town in April 1877.
