= Sidney Street, Cambridge =

Major street in central Cambridge, England

Coordinates: 52.2071°N 0.12°E

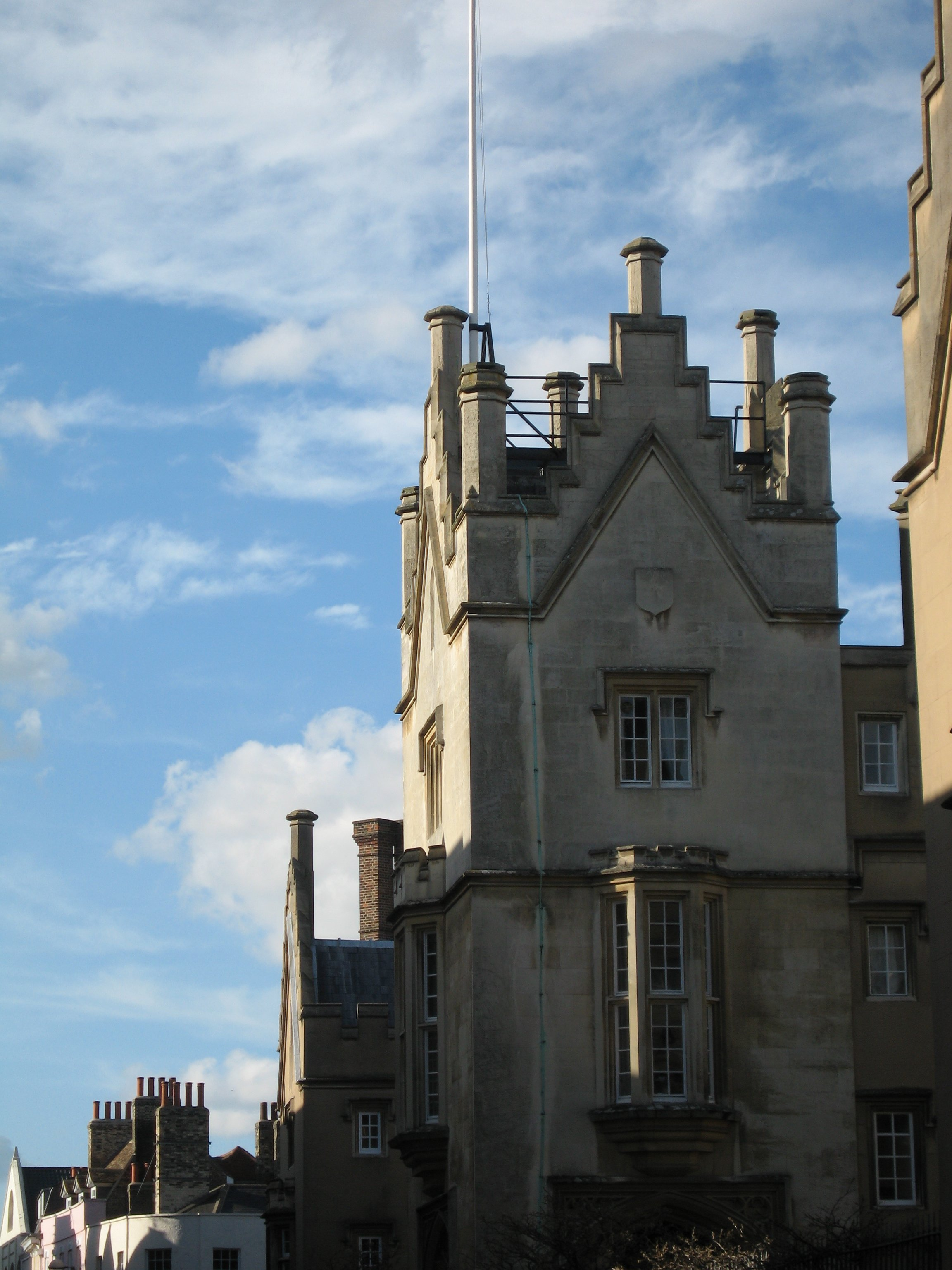
Sidney Sussex College

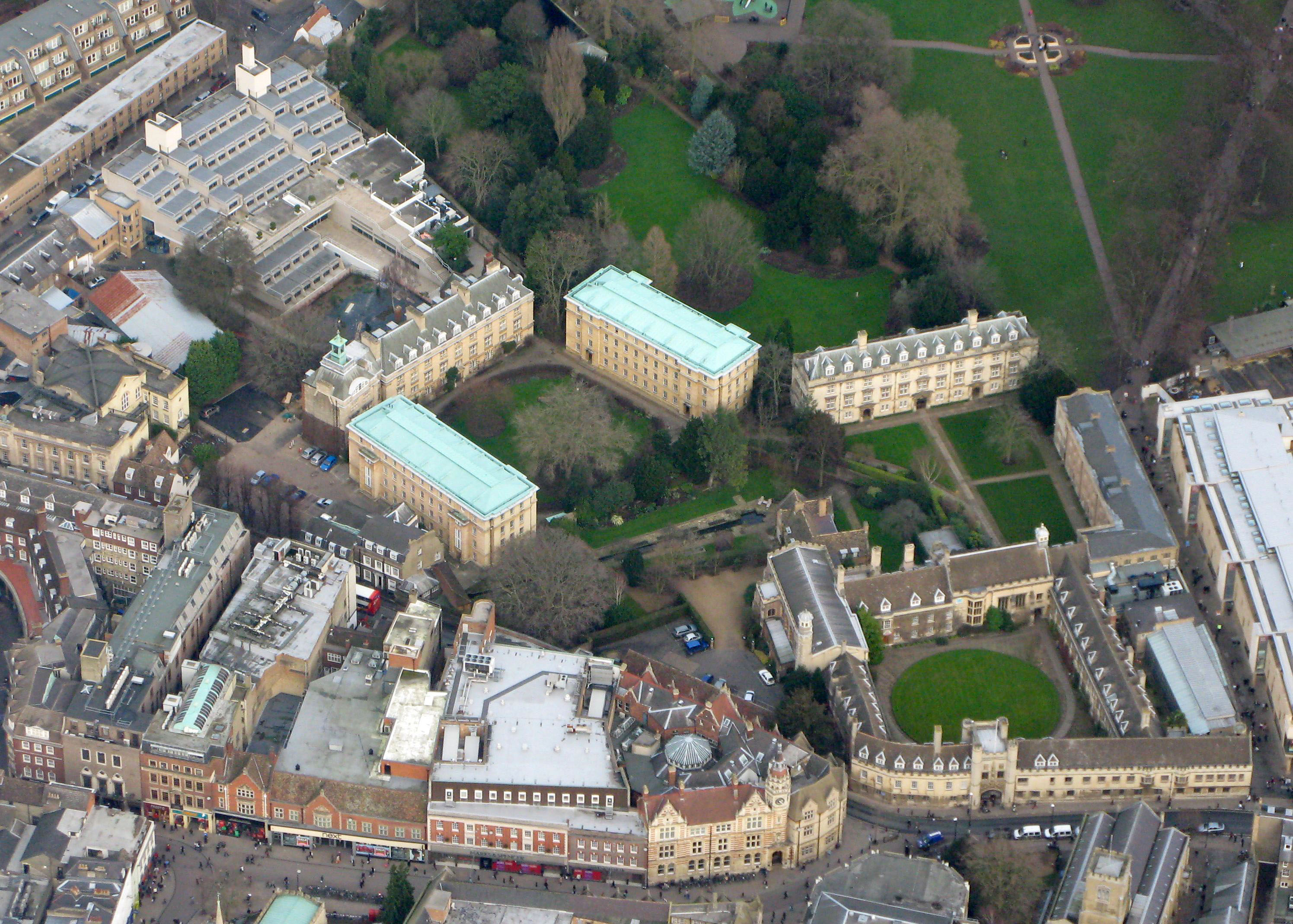
Aerial view with the southern end of Sidney Street in the foreground (centre and left) and Christ's College in the background

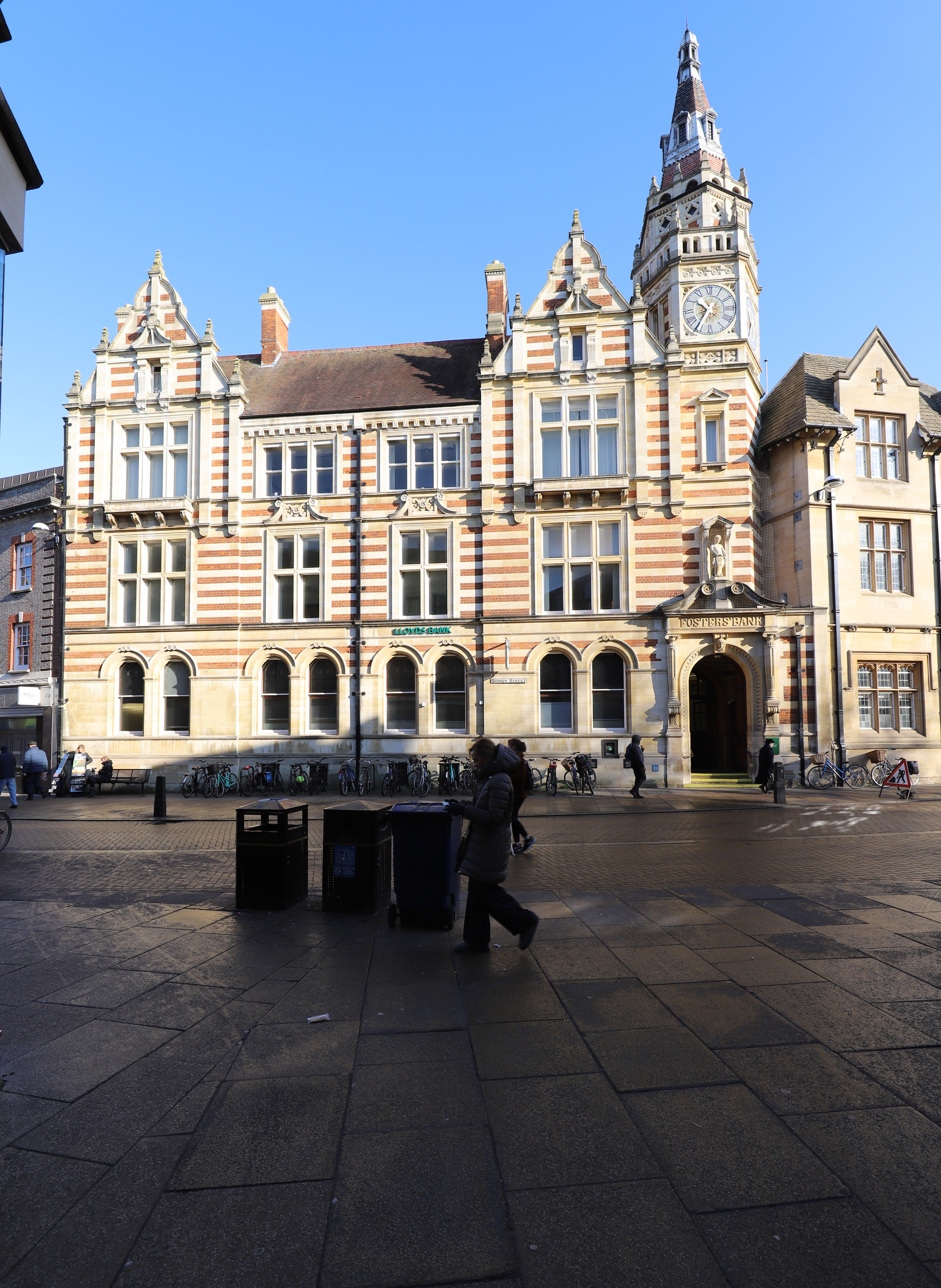
Lloyds Bank (1890–1893)

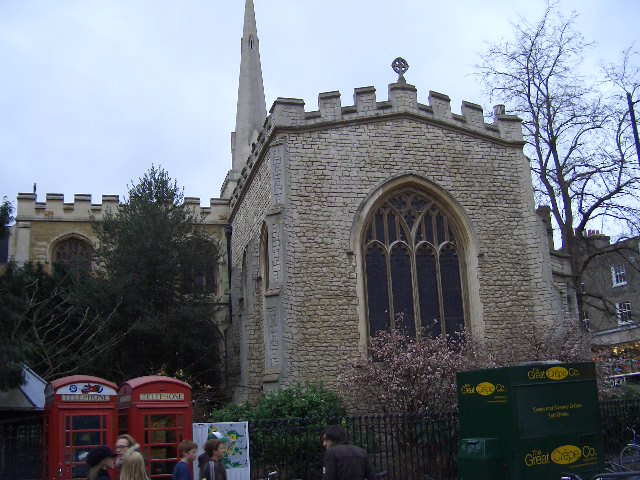
Holy Trinity Church, on the corner with Market Street

Sidney Street is a major street in central Cambridge, England. It runs between Bridge Street at the junction with Jesus Lane to the northwest and St Andrew's Street at the junction with Hobson Street to the southeast.

On the northeastern side of the street is the University of Cambridge college Sidney Sussex College. Opposite the college, Green Street, another shopping street, leads off to the west. To the southeast of the college is Sussex Street. On the corner is the tall and distinctive Montagu House, part of Sidney Sussex College.

Holy Trinity Church is on the southwestern side, on the southern corner with Market Street.

== Shops ==
The street has a number of shops, especially on the southwestern side. The buildings owned by Sidney Sussex, Gonville and Caius, and St John's colleges, for example Trinity College owns the building that houses the J Sainsbury food store, the main central Cambridge supermarket. Other shops include Boots and Marks & Spencer.

The Lloyds Bank building was designed by the Victorian architect Alfred Waterhouse and built 1890–93. Originally the building was part of Fosters' Bank and the name still exists over the doorway.

== See also ==
- Cambridge Commonwealth Trust
- Ginn & Co Solicitors
