= Green Street, Cambridge =

Street in Cambridge, England

Coordinates: 52°12′24″N 0°07′10″E

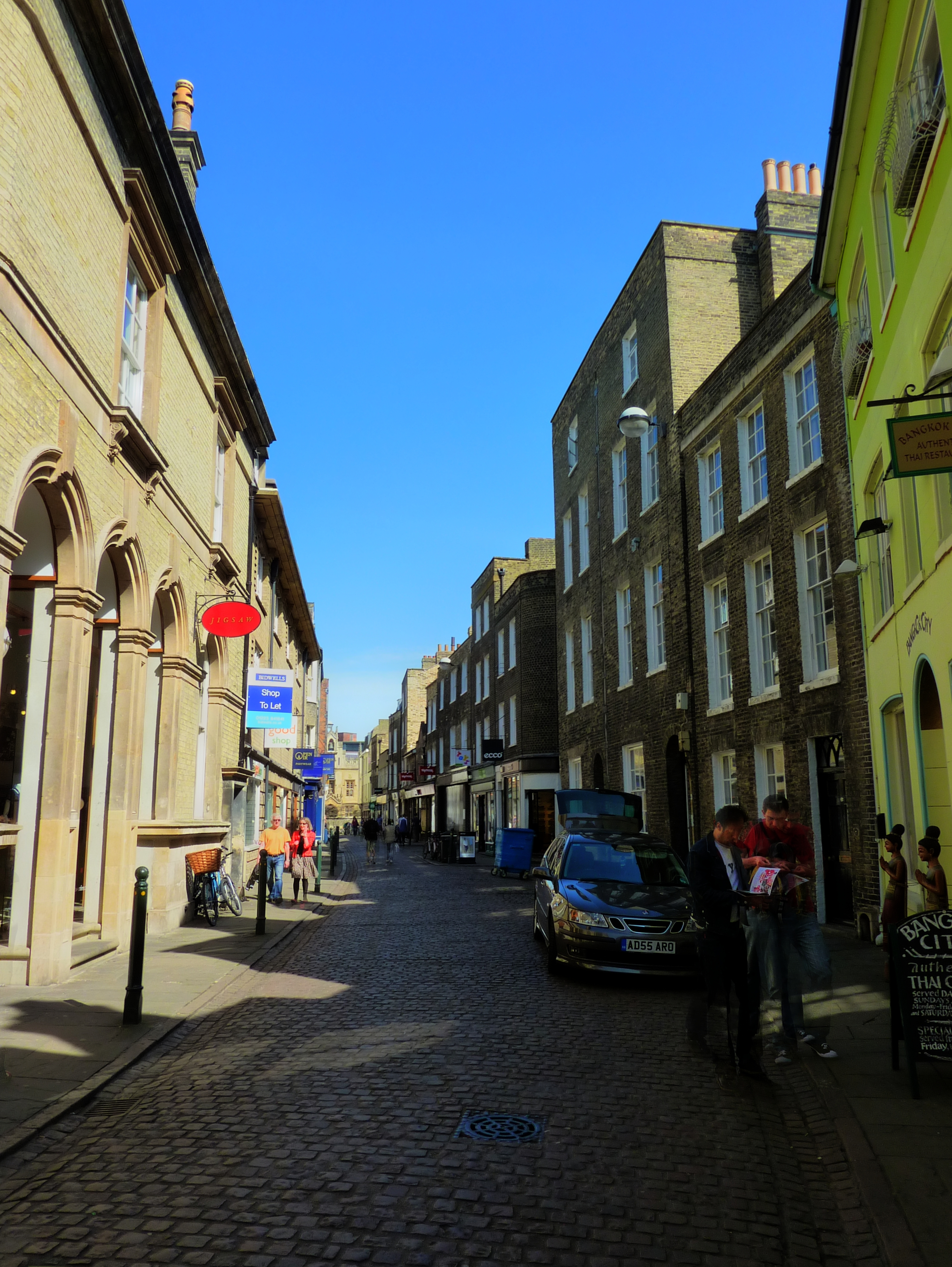
Green Street, Cambridge.

Green Street is a street known for its shops and restaurants in central Cambridge, England. It runs between St John's Street and Trinity Street at the western end and Sidney Street at the eastern end. Opposite the west end is Trinity College and opposite the east end is Sidney Sussex College. The street is probably named after the owner of the land when the first houses were built on the street.

W. Metcalfe and Son was a printer and publisher in Cambridge during the 19th century and early 20th century, with an office on Green Street for part of this period. In 1854, the publishers George Bell & Sons acquired Deighton's offices on Green Street and also Trinity Street.

== Shops ==
The street is one of Cambridge's shopping streets. The shops include a high proportion of independent shops and boutiques as well as some well-known high street names. Trinity College owns most of the buildings in the street.
