= Matthew & Son (department store) =

Former department store in Cambridge

Matthew & Son was a department store and grocery shop based in Trinity Street, Cambridge.

== History ==
Matthew & Son was started in 1832, when David Matthew went into partnership with John Gent to form Matthew & Gent. The new store was based at 25 Trinity Street and sold grocery, china and glassware. In 1833, John, David's younger brother joined the firm and took over in 1849 when David left to return to London.

In 1874, Matthew & Gent became Matthew & Son with the arrival of John's son Henry to the business, however Henry had an early death and the business was inherited by his younger brother Arthur. The business moved to 20-21 Trinity Street in 1858, and in 1894 opened a Wine & Spirits shop at 19 Trinity Street followed by the Oriental Cafe in 1896 at 14 Trinity Street. Several local branches were opened in Cambridge selling groceries.

In 1917, Matthew died, leaving his wife Maude to run the business. Eventually his son Bernard took over as Managing Director in 1937, and continued to run the business until they sold it to Harveys Wine Merchants in 1962. The business continued to operate under the Matthew & Son name until 1964.
