= James Joseph Mannion =

Policeman and soldier

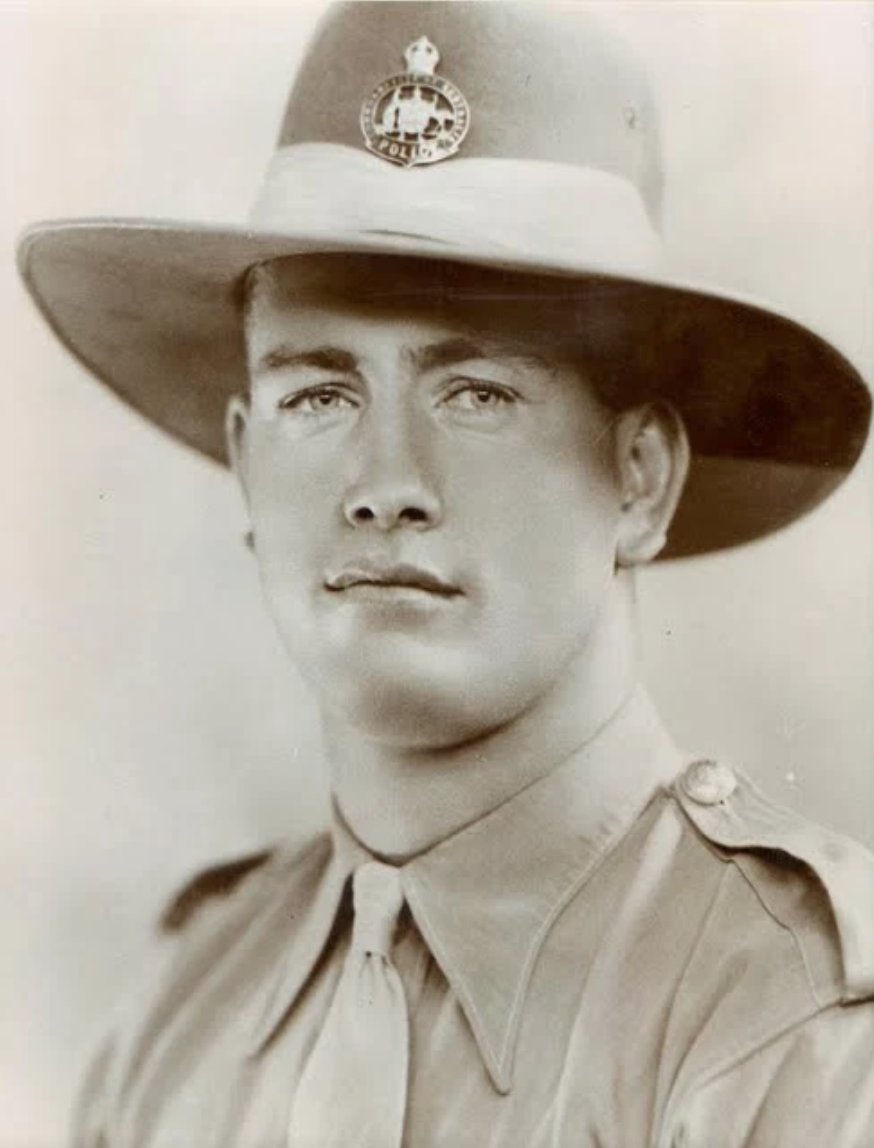
- Born: 1 August 1912; Broken Hill, Australia
- Died: 18 September 1968 (aged 56)
- Occupations: Police officer, writer
- Awards: George Medal

James (Jim) Joseph Mannion (1 August 1912 – 18 September 1968) was a renowned policeman and soldier who worked in the Northern Territory of Australia. He is best known for an act of bravery clearing a burning building of occupants, an act which saw him awarded a George Medal.

== Early life ==
Mannion was born in Broken Hill, New South Wales on 1 August 1912. His father was Martin Henry Mannion and his mother, Marcella Ellen (née Marron) who died when he was two years old. He went to school in Adelaide and began his career working on farms in South Australia. At the age of 18, he began writing about boxing for The Ring as their Australian correspondent. He continued to write about boxing throughout his life.

== Career ==
He joined the Northern Territory Police Force on 29 March 1936. He first worked in Darwin and was involved in a number of violent incidents during that time.

In January 1937 he was posted to Tennant Creek, where he met and married Nancy Gwennyth Collins on 26 February 1938.

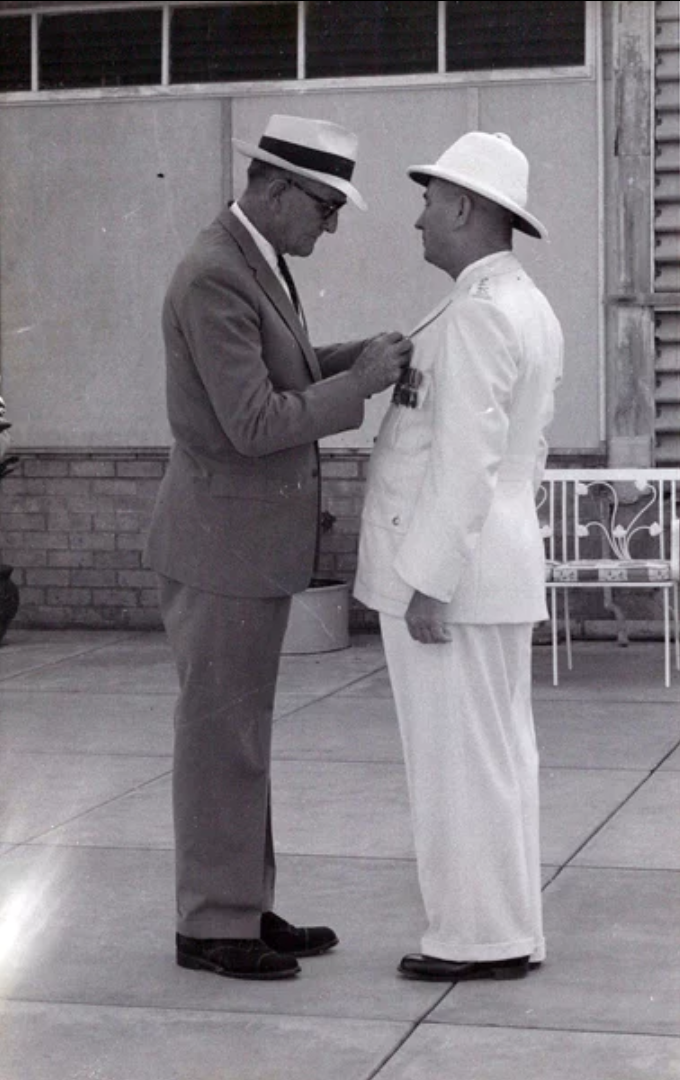
James Joseph Mannion receives the Georges Medal

Mannion enlisted in the Australian Imperial Force on 7 August 1940 in Adelaide, South Australia, serving in both the Middle East and New Guinea as part of the 2/27th Battalion. He was honourably discharged on 5 October 1944.

After World War II, Mannion returned to work in Tennant Creek and Katherine. He received the George Medal for his work at a fire at Campbell's Store in Tennant Creek on 3 December 1956. He entered the burning building to clear any remaining occupants. In another notable incident, Mannion was shot in the leg when responding to the shooting of Constable Bill Condon in Katherine. The incident was turned into a cartoon which was published in The Eagle magazine in 1962.

Mannion later worked at the Police and Citizens Boys Club in Darwin as a boxing trainer. In 1964, he became the founding editor of police magazine Citation. Mannion was awarded a Police Long Service Medal and a Good Conduct Medal in March 1965. Mannion died on 18 September 1968 while still serving.

== Legacy ==
Mannion's photographs and home videos are held by the NT Police Museum and Historical Society.

Mannion Street in Katherine is named after him.
