= Thomas Ashe (poet) =

English poet

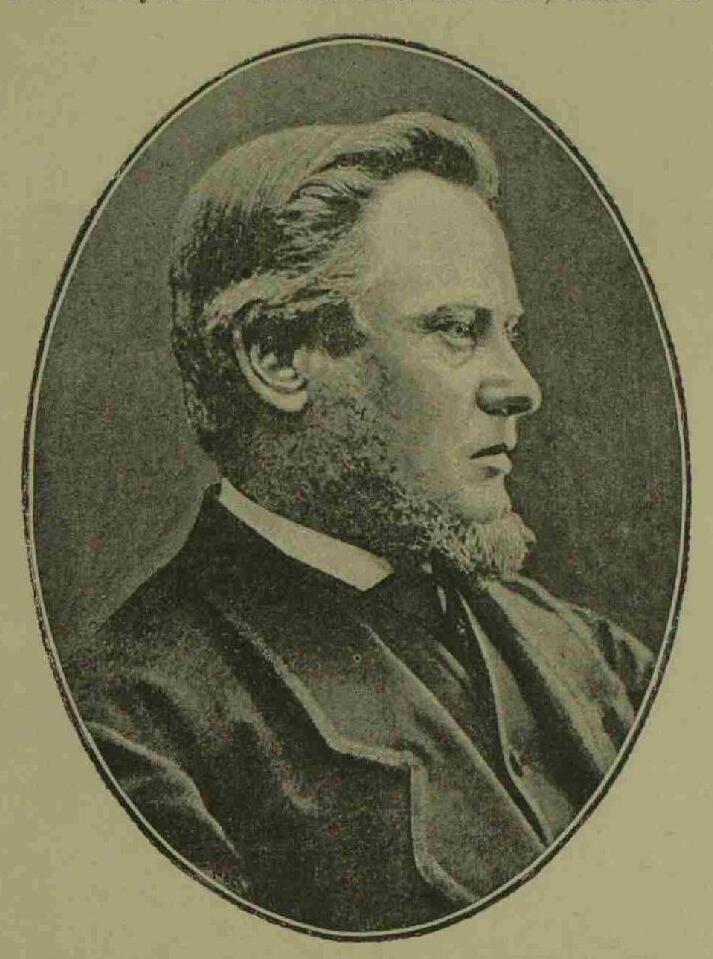
- Born: June 1836; Stockport
- Died: 18 December 1889; Pimlico
- Education: St John's College, Stockport Grammar School
- Occupation: Poet

Thomas Ashe (1836–1889) was an English poet.

== Life ==
He was born in Stockport, Cheshire in 1836. His father, John Ashe (d. 1879), originally a Manchester manufacturer and an amateur artist, resolved late in life to take holy orders, was prepared for ordination by his own son, and became vicar of St. Paul's at Crewe in 1869. Thomas was educated at Stockport Grammar School and St. John's College, Cambridge, where he entered as a sizar in 1855 and graduated B.A. as senior optime in 1859.

He took up scholastic work in Peterborough, was ordained deacon in 1859 and priest in 1860; at Easter 1860 he became curate of Silverstone, Northamptonshire. But clerical work proved distasteful, and he gave himself entirely to schoolmastering. In 1865 he became mathematical and modern form master at Leamington College, whence he moved to a similar post at Queen Elizabeth's School, Ipswich. Here he became a major influence on Charles Sherrington. He remained there nine years. After two years in Paris he finally settled in London in 1881.

Here he was engaged in editing Samuel Taylor Coleridge's works. The poems appeared in the 'Aldine Series' of poets in 1885. Three volumes of prose were published in Bohn's 'Standard Library'; Lecture and Notes on Shakspere in 1883', Table Talk and Omniana in 1884, and in Miscellanies, Aesthetic and Literary, in 1885. Ashe died in London on 18 Dec 1889, but was buried in St. James's Churchyard, Sutton, Macclesfield; a portrait is given in the Illustrated London News and in The Eagle (xvi. 109).

Ashe was a poet of considerable charm. He wrote steadily from his college days to the end of his life; but, although his powers were recognized by some of the literary journals, his poems failed entirely to gain the ear of his generation.

== Works ==
- Poems (1859)
- Dryope and Other Poems (1861)
- Pictures, and Other Poems (1865)
- The Sorrows of Hypsipyle: a Poem (1867)
- Edith: or, Love and Life in Cheshire, a Poem (1873)
- Poems (1885)
- Songs of a Year (1888)
