= Gonville and Caius College, Cambridge =

Constituent college of the University of Cambridge

Gonville and Caius College
- University of Cambridge
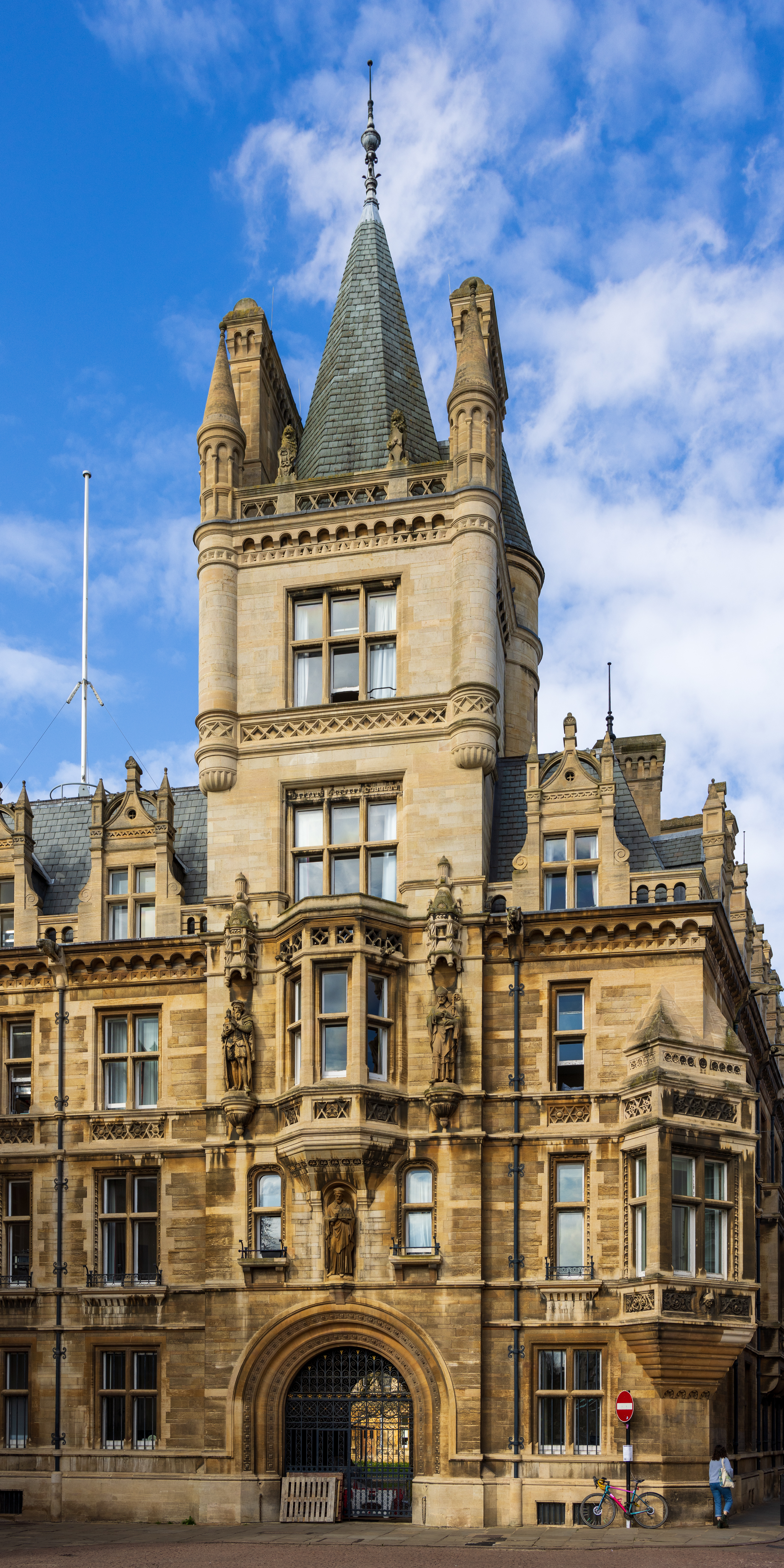
- Gonville & Caius College from King's Parade

- Arms: see below
Scarf colours: four equal stripes alternating black and Cambridge blue
- Location: Trinity Street (map)
- Coordinates: 52.2059°N 0.1179°E
- Abbreviation: CAI
- Founders: Edmund Gonville (1348); John Caius (1557)
- Established: 1348, refounded 1557
- Former names: Gonville Hall (1348–1351); Hall of the Annunciation of the Blessed Virgin Mary (1351–1557)
- Sister college: Brasenose College, Oxford
- Master: Richard Gilbertson
- Undergraduates: 600 (2023–24)
- Postgraduates: 257 (2023–24)
- Endowment: £271M (2024)
- Website: cai.cam.ac.uk
- Student Union: Gonville and Caius Student Union
- Boat club: Caius Boat Club

Map
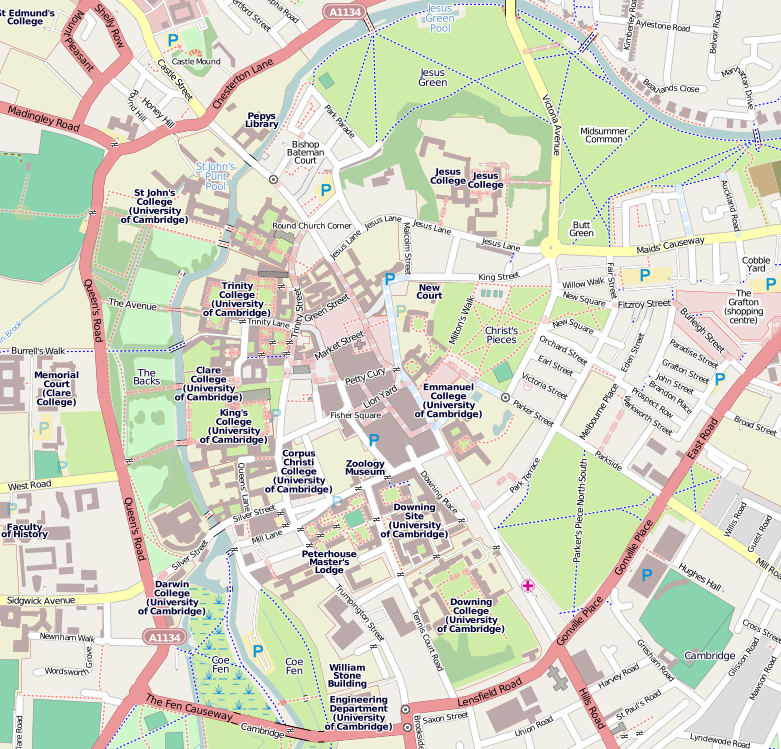
- Location within Central Cambridge

Gonville and Caius College, commonly known as Caius (/kiːz/ KEEZ), is a constituent college of the University of Cambridge in Cambridge, England. Founded in 1348 by Edmund Gonville, it is the fourth-oldest of the University of Cambridge's 31 colleges and one of the wealthiest. In 1557, it was refounded by John Caius, an alumnus and English physician.

The college has been attended by many students who have gone on to significant accomplishment, including fifteen Nobel Prize winners, the second-largest number of any Oxbridge college.

Several streets in the city, including Harvey Road, Glisson Road, and Gresham Road, are named after Gonville and Caius alumni. The college and its masters have been influential in the development of the university, including in the founding of other colleges, including Trinity Hall and Darwin College and providing land on Sidgwick Site on which the Faculty of Law was built.

== History ==
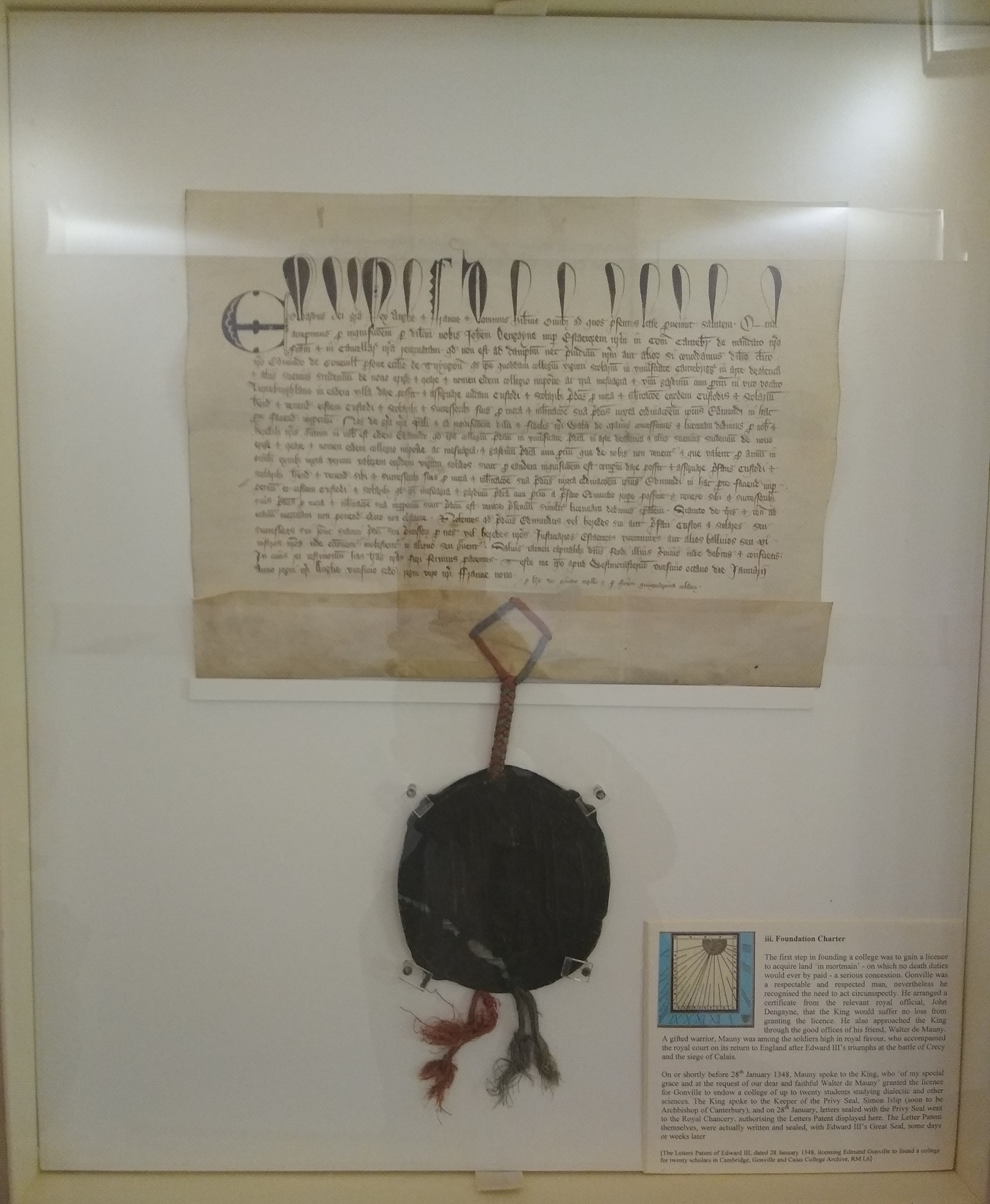
The 1348 foundation charter of Gonville Hall

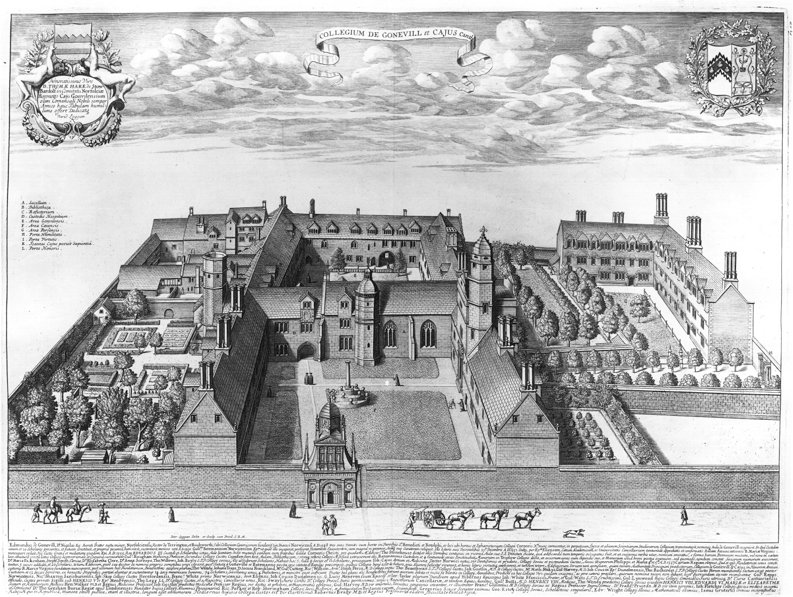
Gonville and Caius College in David Loggan's 1690 Cantabrigia illustrata

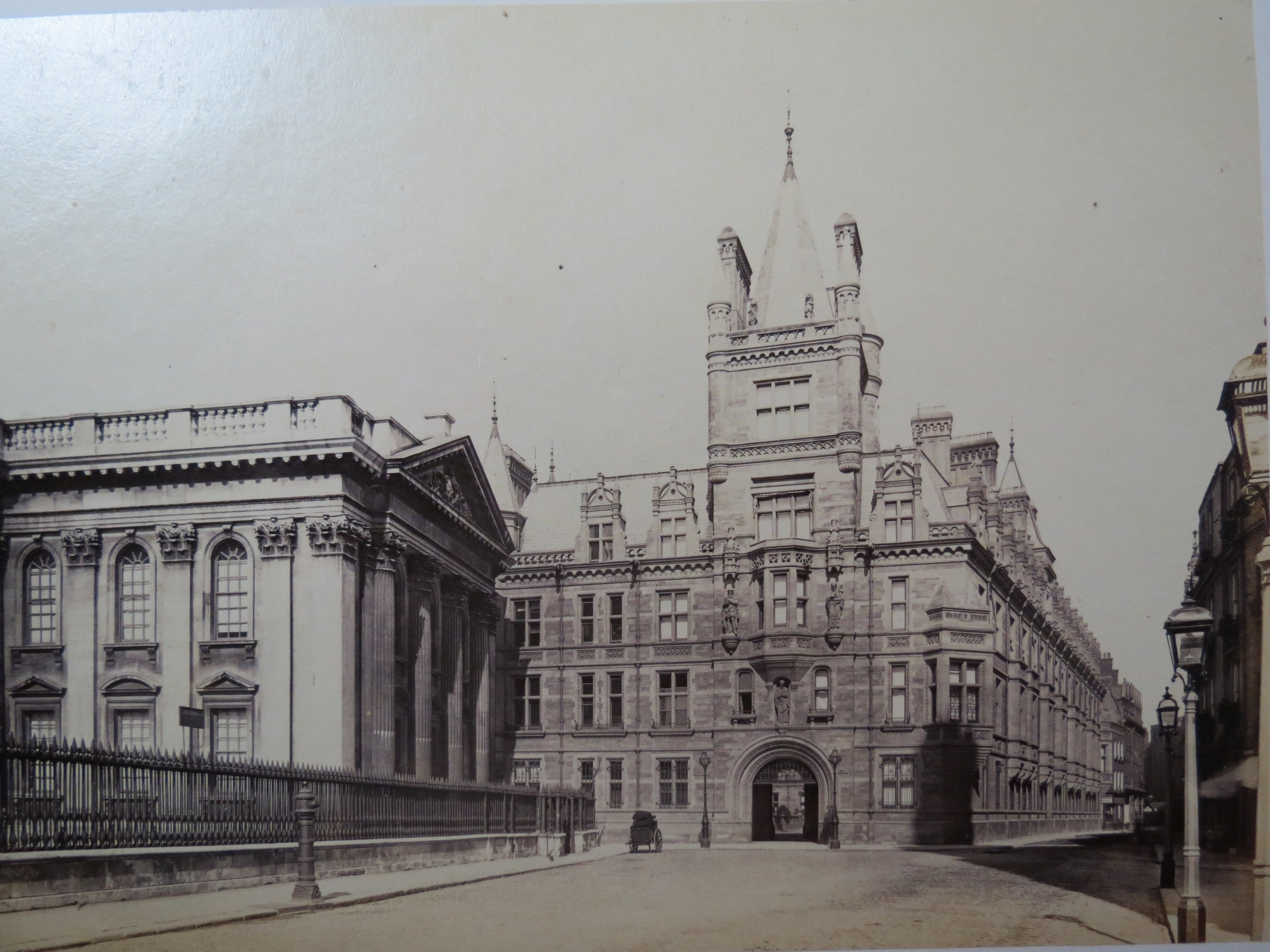
Gonville and Caius College, from King's Parade, c. 1870

The college was founded in 1348 as Gonville Hall by Edmund Gonville, a clergyman who hailed from a gentry family of French origin. Gonville held various positions in the English Church, serving as Rector of three parishes, Thelnetham (1320–26), Rushford, Norfolk (1326–1342), and Terrington St Clement (1343–1351). Such occupations afforded him sufficient wealth that he was able to lend money to Edward III, an act that saw him appointed a King's Clerk.

With the support of Sir Walter Manny, Gonville petitioned the king for permission to found a college at Cambridge consisting of 20 scholars. In January 1348, Edward III granted this request and issued Letters patent. The 1348 founding makes Gonville and Caius the fourth-oldest surviving college at Cambridge.

Gonville died three years later, in 1351, and left behind an institution that had begun to struggle financially. William Bateman, Bishop of Norwich, intervened and moved the college to its current location off Trinity Street in central Cambridge. He also leased himself land close to the River Cam to set up his own college, Trinity Hall. Gonville Hall was renamed The Hall of the Annunciation of the Blessed Virgin Mary and Bateman appointed his former chaplain John Colton, who was later made Archbishop of Armagh, as the college's master.

By the sixteenth century, the college had fallen into disrepair. In 1557, it was refounded by Royal Charter as Gonville and Caius College by alumnus John Caius. Caius had studied divinity at the college between 1529 and 1533 and later travelled to Renaissance Italy, where he studied medicine at the University of Padua under Montanus and Vesalius. Following his return to England, Caius had become a renowned physician and served many terms as president of the Royal College of Physicians. At the time of the college's re-founding, he had worked as physician to two English monarchs, Edward VI and Mary I, and later served in the same capacity for Elizabeth I.

Following the death of Thomas Bacon, Caius was appointed master of the college on 24 January 1559, a position he held until shortly before his own death in 1573. He provided the college with significant funds and greatly expanded the college's buildings. Caius accepted no payment for his services but insisted on several rules, including that the college admit no scholar who "is deformed, dumb, blind, lame, maimed, mutilated, a Welshman, or suffering from any grave or contagious illness, or an invalid, that is sick in a serious measure". Caius also built a three-sided court, Caius Court, "lest the air from being confined within a narrow space should become foul". Caius was responsible for developing the college's strong global reputation in medicine, which continues to this day.

By 1630, the college had expanded greatly with roughly 25 fellows and 150 students. But the number of fellows and students fell in the following century, returning to the 1630 level only in the early nineteenth century. Since then, Gonville and Caius has grown considerably, and it has now one of the University of Cambridge's largest undergraduate populations. In 1979, the college first admitted women as fellows and students. It now has over 110 Fellows, over 850 students and over 160 permanent staff.

Gonville and Caius is one of the wealthiest of all Cambridge colleges with an endowment of £271 million in 2024.

The college's present 44th Master, appointed in 2025, is Richard Gilbertson.

== Buildings and grounds ==
=== Old Courts ===
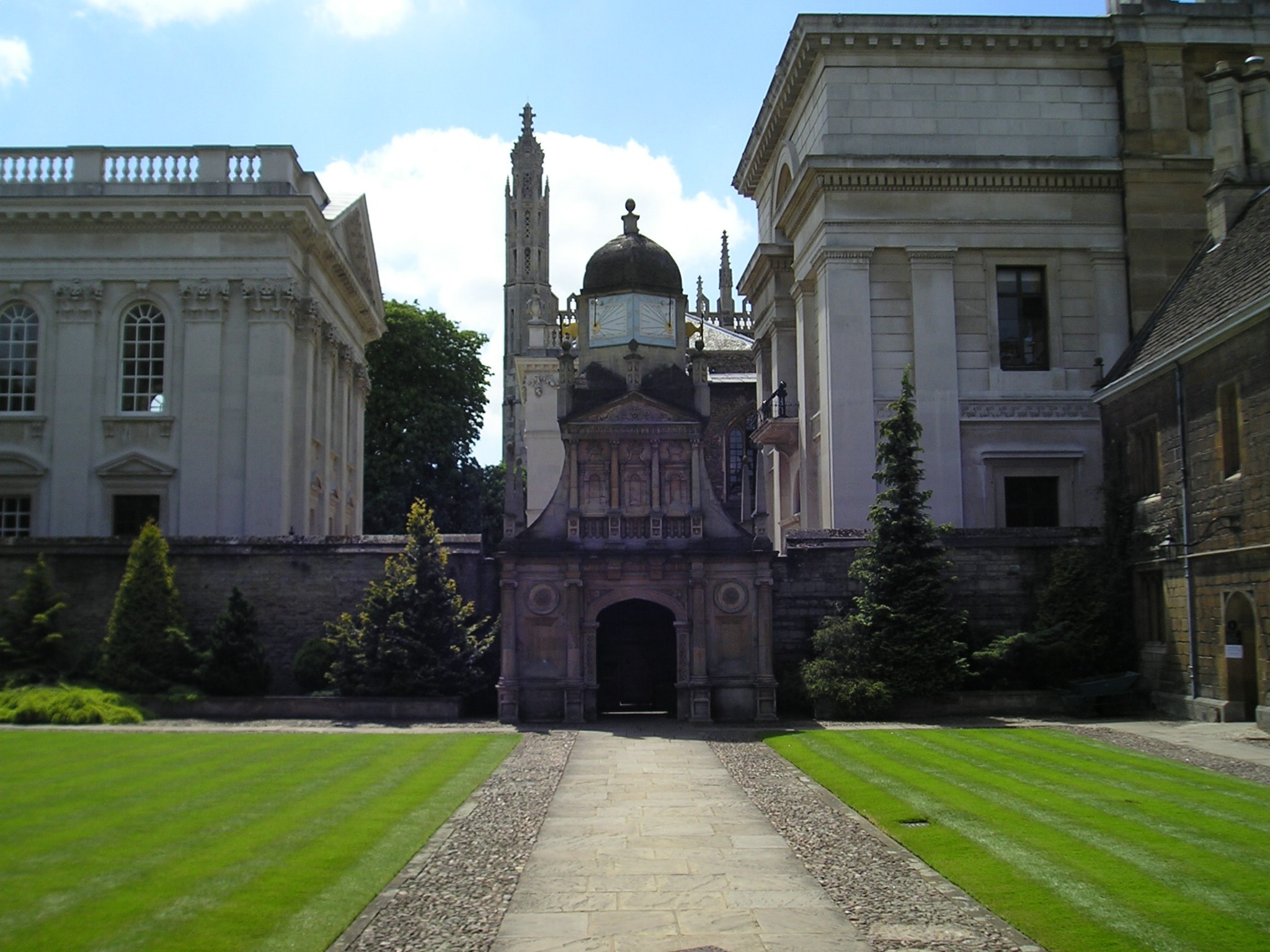
The Gate of Honour

The first buildings erected on the college's current site date from 1353 when Bateman built Gonville Court. The college chapel was added in 1393 with the Old Hall (used until recently as a library); Master's Lodge followed in the next half century. Most of the stone used to build the college came from Ramsey Abbey near Ramsey, Cambridgeshire. Gonville and Caius has the oldest purpose-built college chapel in continuous use in either Oxford or Cambridge. The chapel is situated centrally within the college, reflecting the college's religious foundation.

On the re-foundation by Caius, the college was expanded and updated. In 1565, the building of Caius Court began, and Caius planted an avenue of trees in what is now known as Tree Court.

Caius was also responsible for building the college's three gates, symbolising the path of academic life:

- the Gate of Humility, near the Porters' Lodge in the centre of the campus, passed through by students on matriculation;
- the Gate of Virtue, between Tree Court and Caius Court, passed through frequently during their time as students;
- the Gate of Honour to the neighbouring Senate House, passed through on the way to receive their degrees.

The buildings expert James D. Wenn has identified number of meanings in the gate of honour associated with the practice of medicine in classical antiquity, Plato and the geometry of the rhombic dodecahedron.

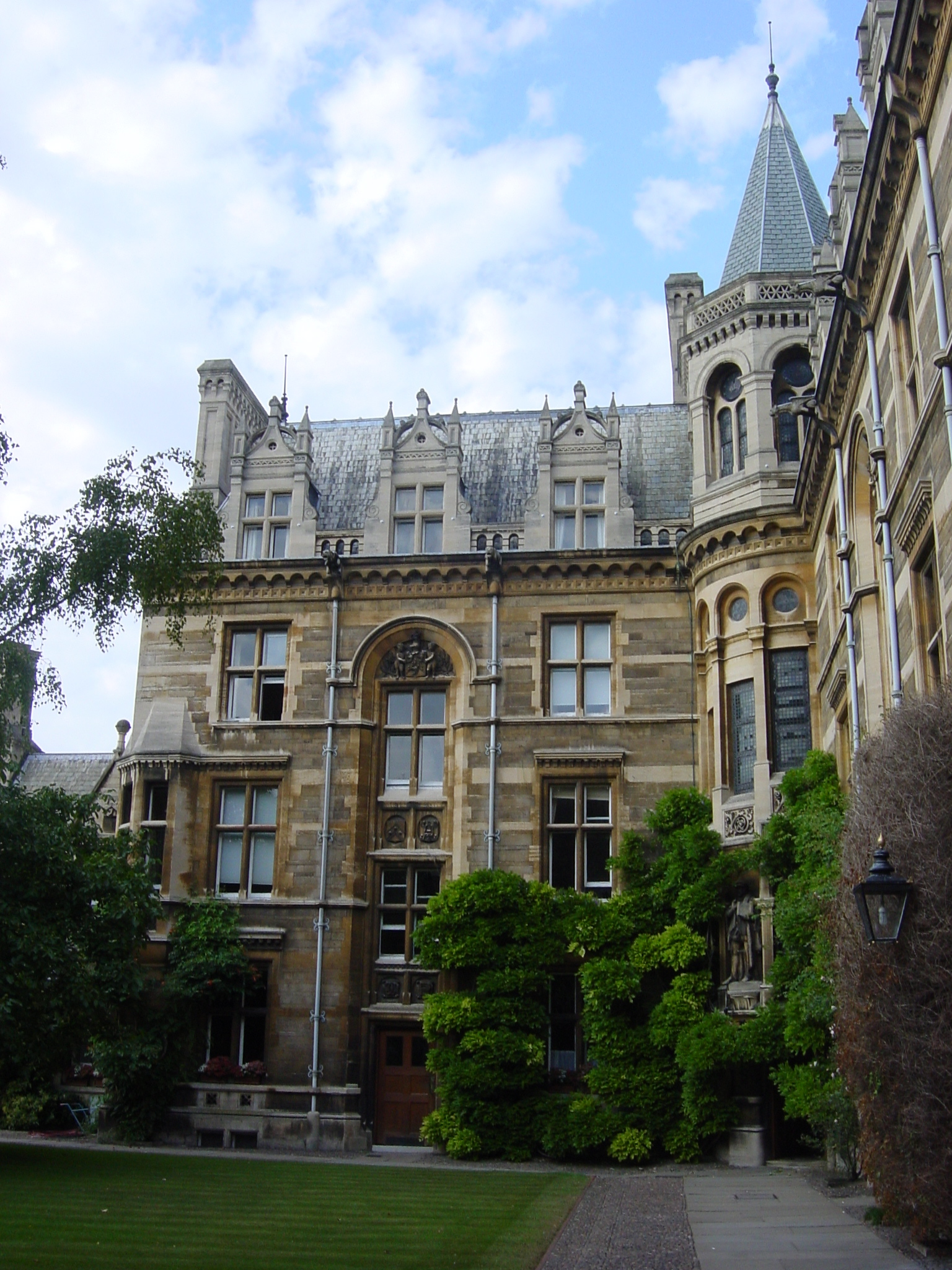
Interior northeast corner of Waterhouse Building

The Gate of Honour is only used for special occasions, including graduation (Students of Gonville and Caius commonly refer to a fourth gate in the college, between Tree Court and Gonville Court, which also gives access to some lavatories, as the Gate of Necessity).

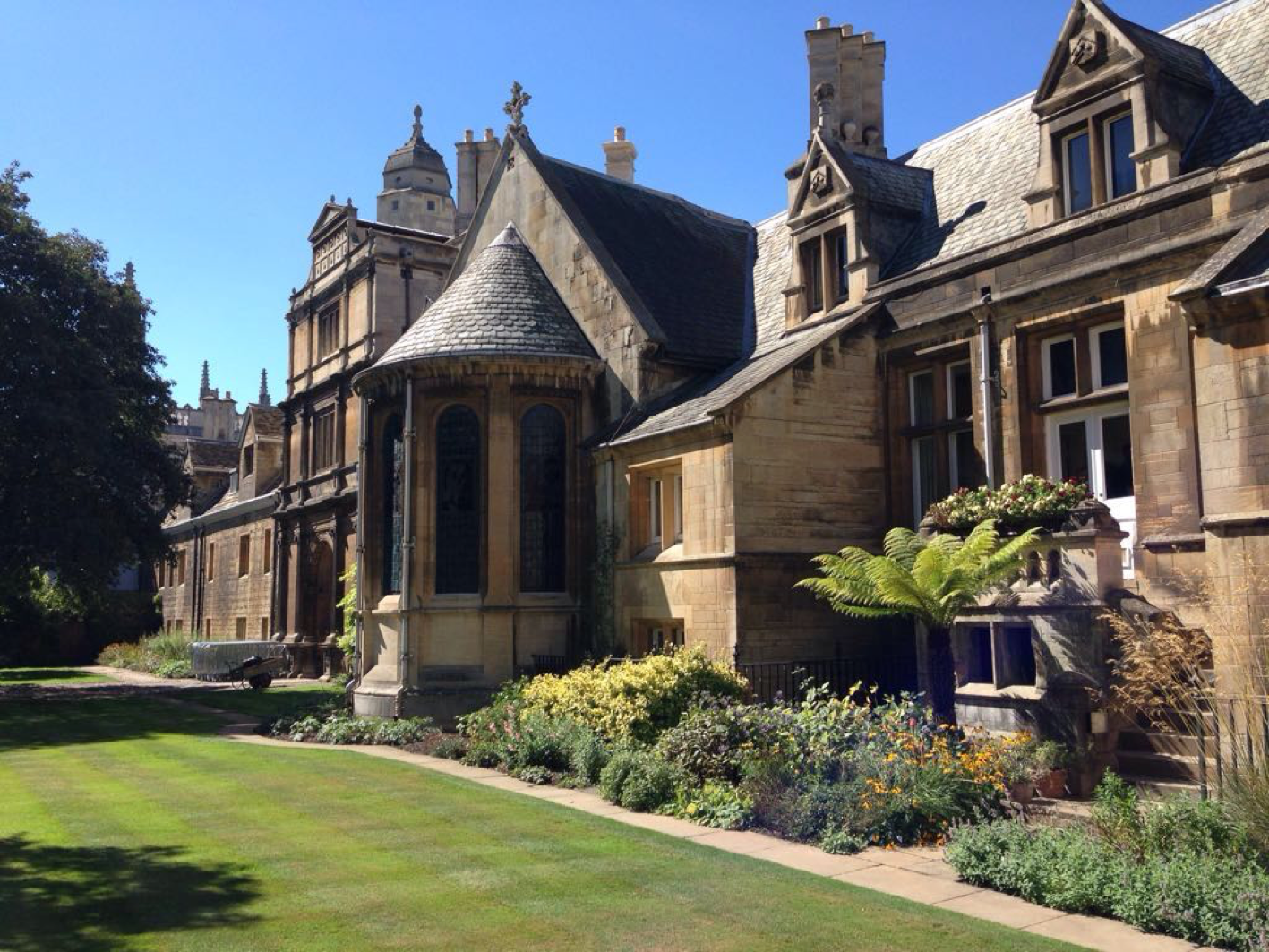
Gonville and Caius Tree Court

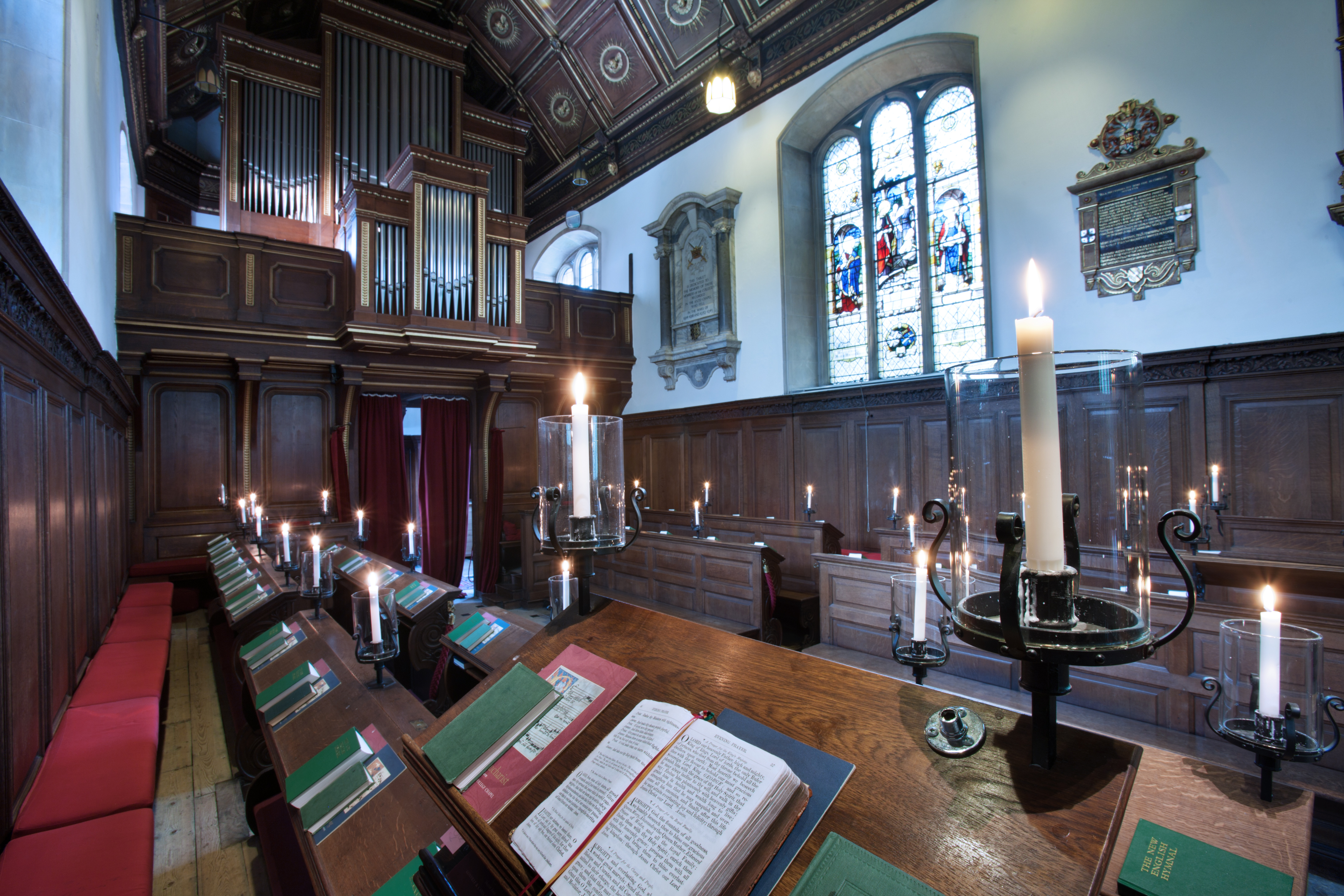
Interior of the chapel

The buildings of Gonville Court were given classical facades in the 1750s. The Old Library and Hall were designed by Anthony Salvin in 1854. On the wall of the Hall hangs a college flag, which in 1912 was flown at the South Pole by Cambridge's Edward Wilson during the Terra Nova Expedition of 1910–1913. Gonville Court, though remodelled in the 18th and 19th centuries, is the oldest part of the college. New lecture rooms were designed by Alfred Waterhouse and completed by Rattee and Kett in 1884.

=== West Road site ===
Caius owns a substantial amount of land between West Road and Sidgwick Avenue. Set in landscaped gardens, the modern Harvey Court (named after William Harvey and designed by Leslie Martin and Colin St John Wilson) was built on West Road in 1961. Adjacent to Harvey Court is the Stephen Hawking Building, which opened its doors to first-year undergraduates in October 2006. The Stephen Hawking Building provides en-suite accommodation for 75 students and eight fellows as well as conference facilities.

Additional buildings provide housing for older students, a day care, and various study and music rooms. The college also owns extensive gardens and the land on which the adjacent Squire Law Library has stood since 1995.

=== Libraries ===
Caius has one of the largest libraries in Oxbridge, housed in the Cockerell Building. Caius acquired the lease on the building, which previously housed the Seeley History Library and the Squire Law Library, in the 1990s. The college library was relocated there from Gonville Court in the summer of 1996, following an extensive renovation.

=== Other courts and college accommodations ===
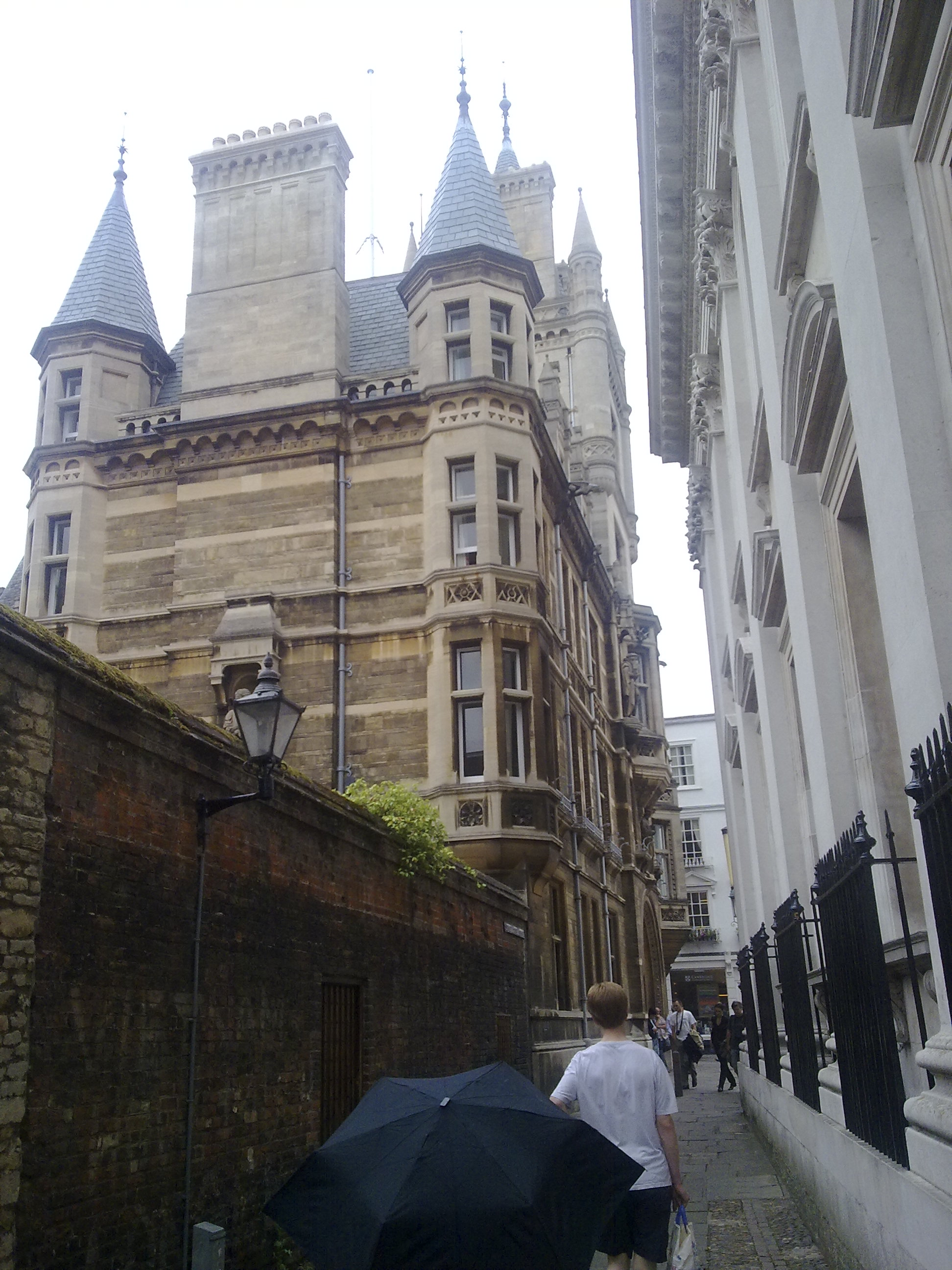
College from adjoining Senate House Passage

Across Trinity Street on land surrounding St Michael's Church. St Michael's Court was completed in the 1930s; on the south side of St Michael's Court is new campus building that overlooks Market Place. The college also owns several houses around Cambridge, on Mortimer Road and Gresham Road, where some second year undergraduates live, and on Harvey Road and St Paul's Road, which are occupied by graduate students.

=== Grounds ===
The Fellows' garden lies just beyond Harvey Court, on Sidgwick Avenue. The extensive sports fields are located on Barton Road, a short walk from Harvey Court.

== Traditions ==
Communal dinner at Gonville and Caius College

Gonville and Caius College maintains many traditions. It offers two seatings in Hall six nights a week. Typically attended by between 150–200 students, Hall consists of a three-course meal served after 17:30 (Cafeteria Hall) or 19:30 (Formal Hall); Formal Hall requires a gown be worn, and seats Fellows at its high table. It is preceded by the benediction, which is said in Latin:

Benedic, Domine, nobis et donis tuis quae ex largitate tua sumus sumpturi; et concede ut, ab iis salubriter enutriti, tibi debitum obsequium praestare valeamus, per Jesum Christum dominum nostrum; mensae caelestis nos participes facias, Rex aeternae gloriae.

There is the expectation that undergraduate students dine a minimum of 36 times each term known as the minimum dining requirement.

As at most Oxbridge colleges, it is tradition that only the Fellows may walk on the grass.

The college also enforces the system of exeats or official permissions to leave the college. Students wishing to be absent from college overnight during term time must obtain leave to do so from their tutors, and terminal exeats must be obtained before the end of term.

=== Arms ===
The college arms were granted in 1575 with the blazon: Argent, on a chevron between two chevronels indented sable three escallops Or, impaling Or, semee of flowers gentil, in chief a sengreen above two serpents erect and respecting one other all proper, the serpents' tails bound together and resting on a square stone of green marble in base, and between the serpents a closed book sable, edged gules clasped and garnished gold; all within a bordure compony argent and sable.

== Student life ==
Caius Boat Club is the college's boat club, with the men's 1st VIII remaining unbeaten in the seasons of 2010/11 and of 2011/2012, and is currently in possession of the May Bumps headship (as well as second place in the Lent bumps, behind LMBC).

Caius Jazz takes place most terms in the college bar, inviting 'some of the most illustrious names in the contemporary scene' and a house band of students studying at London conservatoires to play in the college bar. In recent years Steve Fishwick, Sam Mayne, Ian Shaw, Barry Green, Gareth Lockrane, and Paul Jarvis have all been featured.

The Caius May Ball is an all-night party in June, held every two years.

=== Choir ===
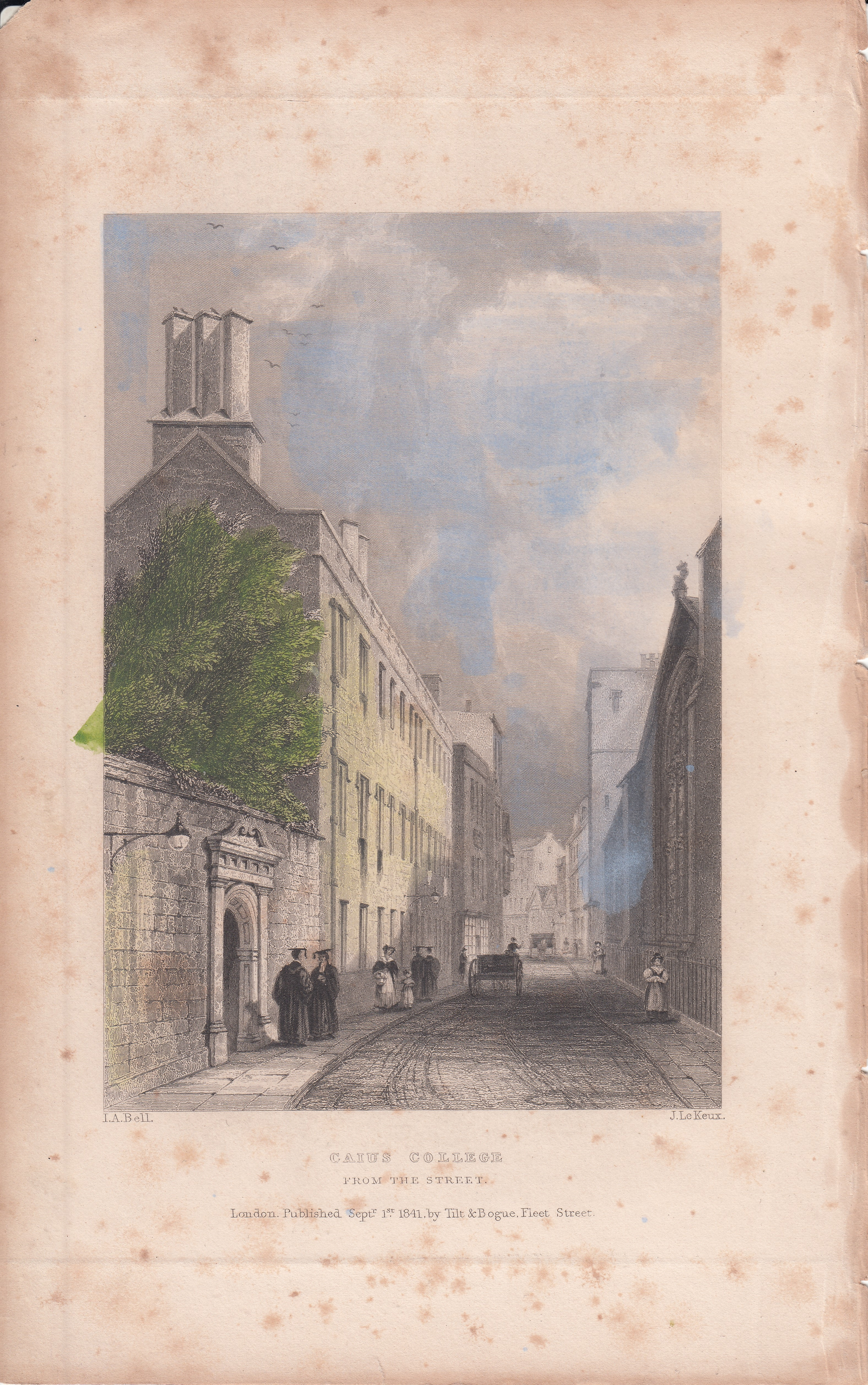
Caius College From Street Hand, 1841

Gonville & Caius College Choir is a mixed choir of 24 voices, with an international reputation for performances of exceptional quality. It tours regularly in the UK and around the world.

The College's musical tradition began at the end of the nineteenth century with a choir of men and boys, founded by the celebrated composer of Anglican church music Charles Wood, and later became an exclusively undergraduate male choir under Wood's successor the composer Patrick Hadley. Hadley was succeeded by Peter Tranchell, under whose direction the choir became mixed in 1979, and Geoffrey Webber directed the choir from 1989 until 2019. The current Director of Music (Precentor) is the Organist and Composer Matthew Martin.

=== Student Union ===
The college's union is Gonville and Caius Student Union (GCSU).

== Notable alumni ==
Famous Gonville and Caius alumni include physicians John Caius (who gave the college the caduceus in its insignia) and William Harvey. Other alumni in the sciences include Francis Crick (joint discoverer of the structure of DNA with James Watson), James Chadwick (discoverer of the neutron), and Howard Florey (developer of penicillin). Stephen Hawking, previously Cambridge's Lucasian Chair of Mathematics Emeritus, was a fellow of the college from 1965 until his death in 2018. Other notable alumni include John Venn (inventor of the Venn diagram), former Chancellor of the Exchequer and Father of the House of Commons Kenneth Clarke, comedian and Channel 4 television presenter Jimmy Carr, and former Downing Street director of communications Alastair Campbell.

Since its founding, Gonville and Caius has graduated accomplished and famed individuals across most fields, including 15 Nobel Prize laureates:

=== Nobel Prize laureates ===
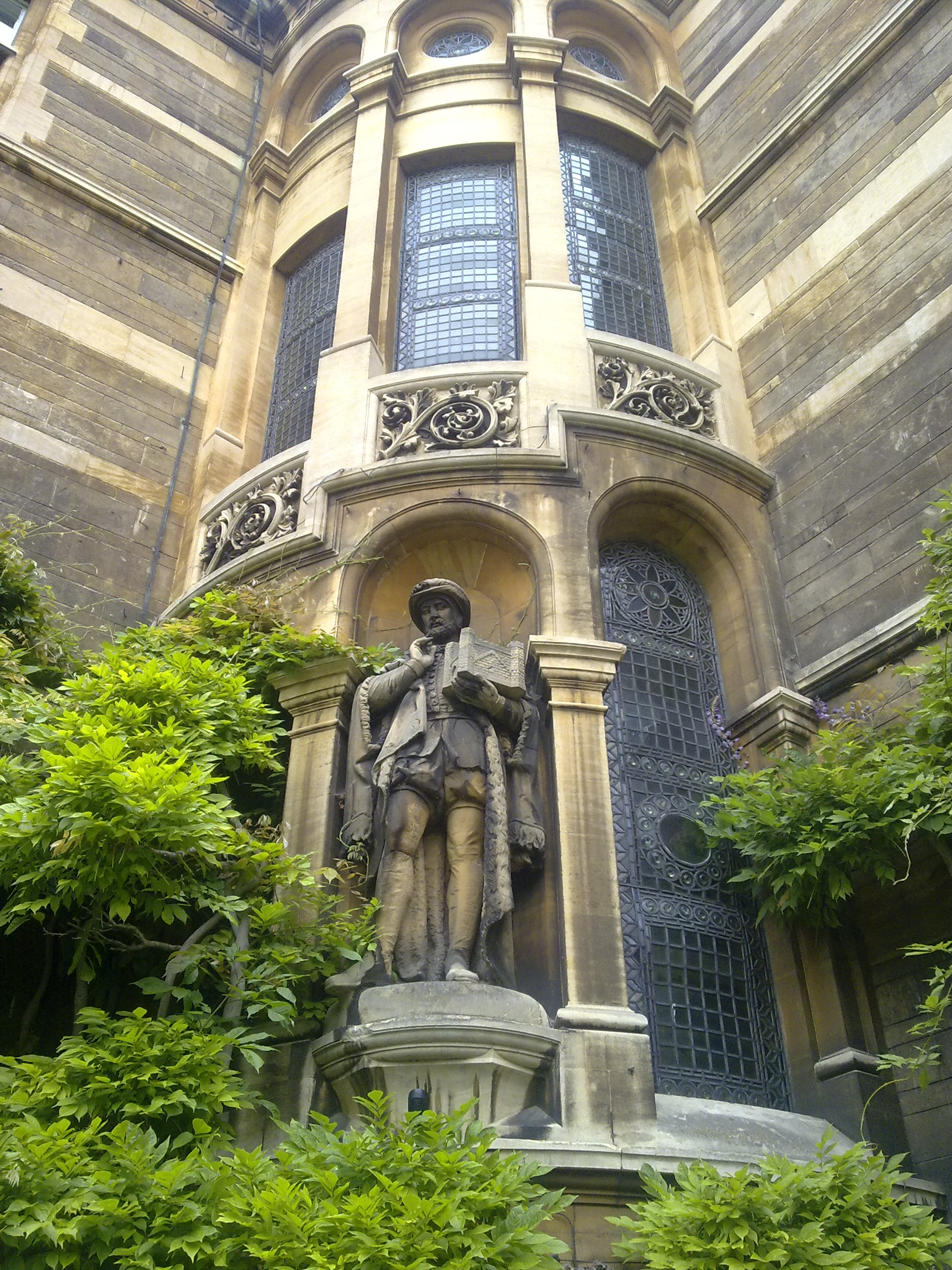
Statue of Stephen Perse, founder of the Perse School in Cambridge, set into the northeast corner of the Waterhouse Building

- 1932 Charles Scott Sherrington – neurophysiologist (student and fellow)
- 1935 James Chadwick – physicist, discoverer of the neutron (PhD student, fellow and master)
- 1945 Howard Florey – co-developer of penicillin (PhD student and fellow).
- 1954 Max Born – physicist (researcher)
- 1962 Francis Crick – discovered DNA's structure (PhD student and honorary fellow)
- 1972 John Hicks – economist (fellow)
- 1974 Antony Hewish – astronomer (student and fellow)
- 1976 Milton Friedman – economist (visiting fellow)
- 1977 Nevill Francis Mott – theoretical physicist (fellow and master)
- 1984 Richard Stone – economist (student)
- 2001 Joseph Stiglitz – economist (fellow)
- 2008 Roger Tsien – chemist (fellow)
- 2013 Michael Levitt – chemist (research fellow)
- 2016 Michael Kosterlitz – physicist (student)
- 2019 Peter J. Ratcliffe – physician-scientist (student)

== Notable organ scholars ==
- Heathcote Dicken Statham (1908–1911)

== Burials ==
- John Caius
- Thomas Legge
- Stephen Perse

== Gallery ==
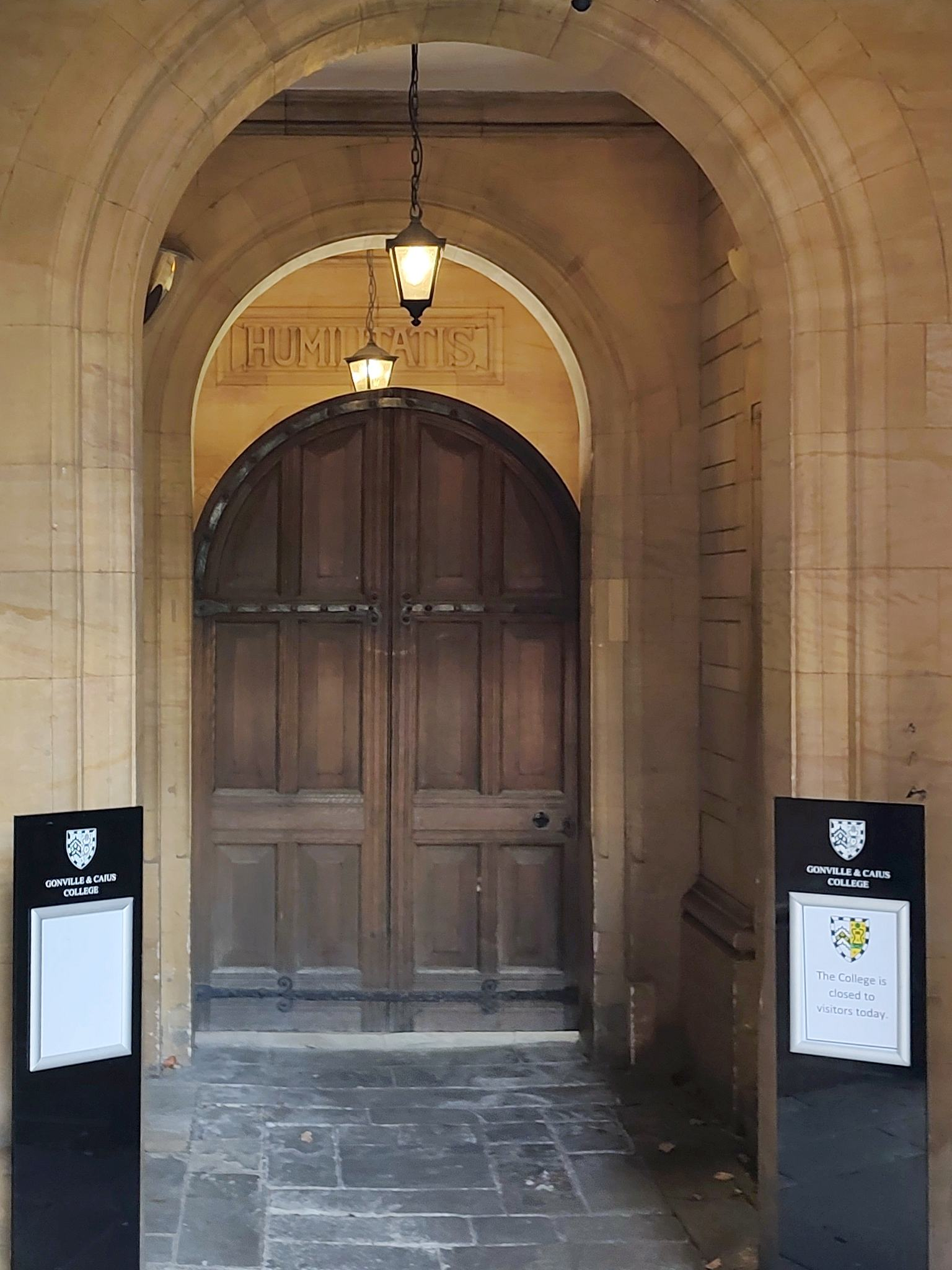
The Gate of Humility

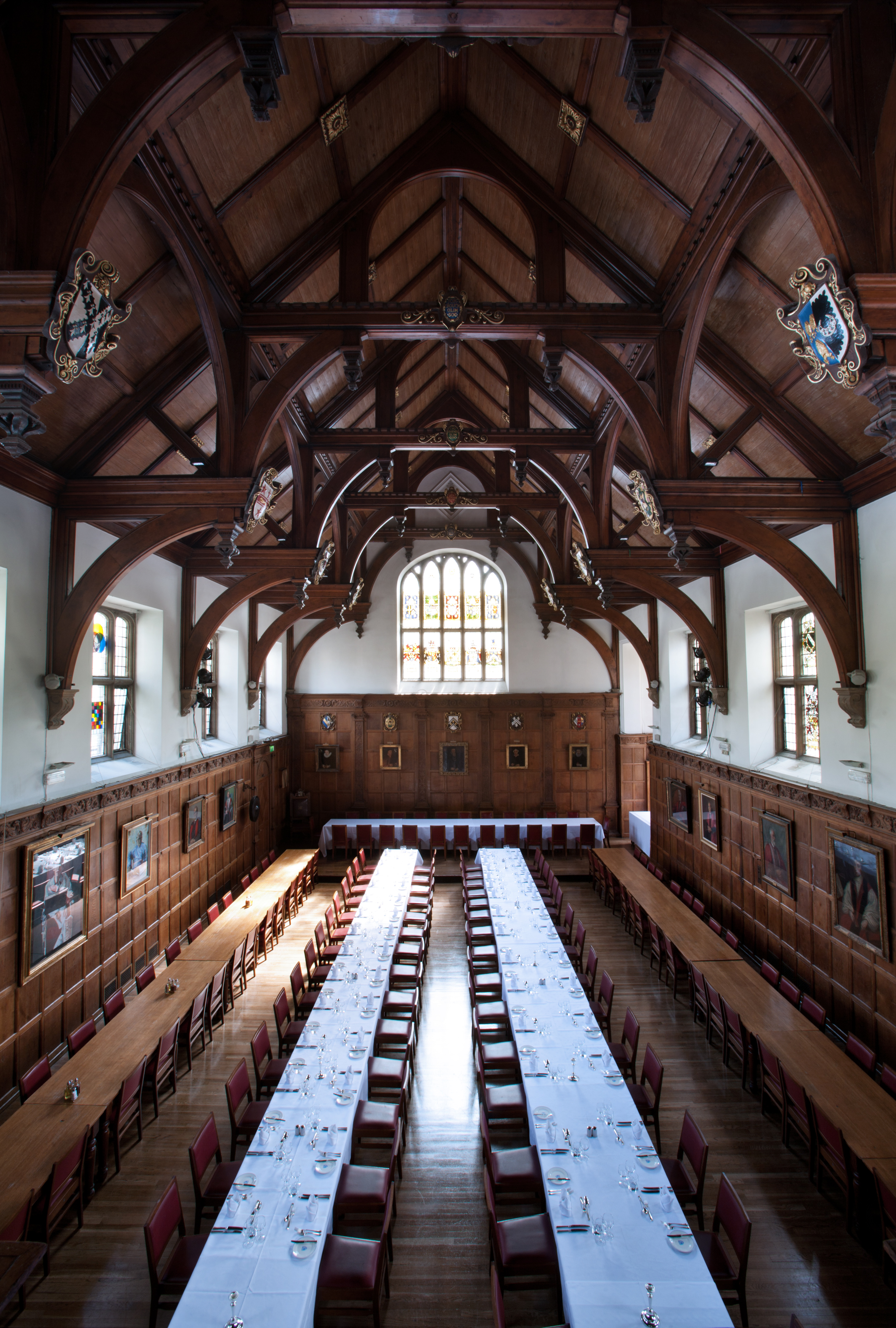
Dining Hall

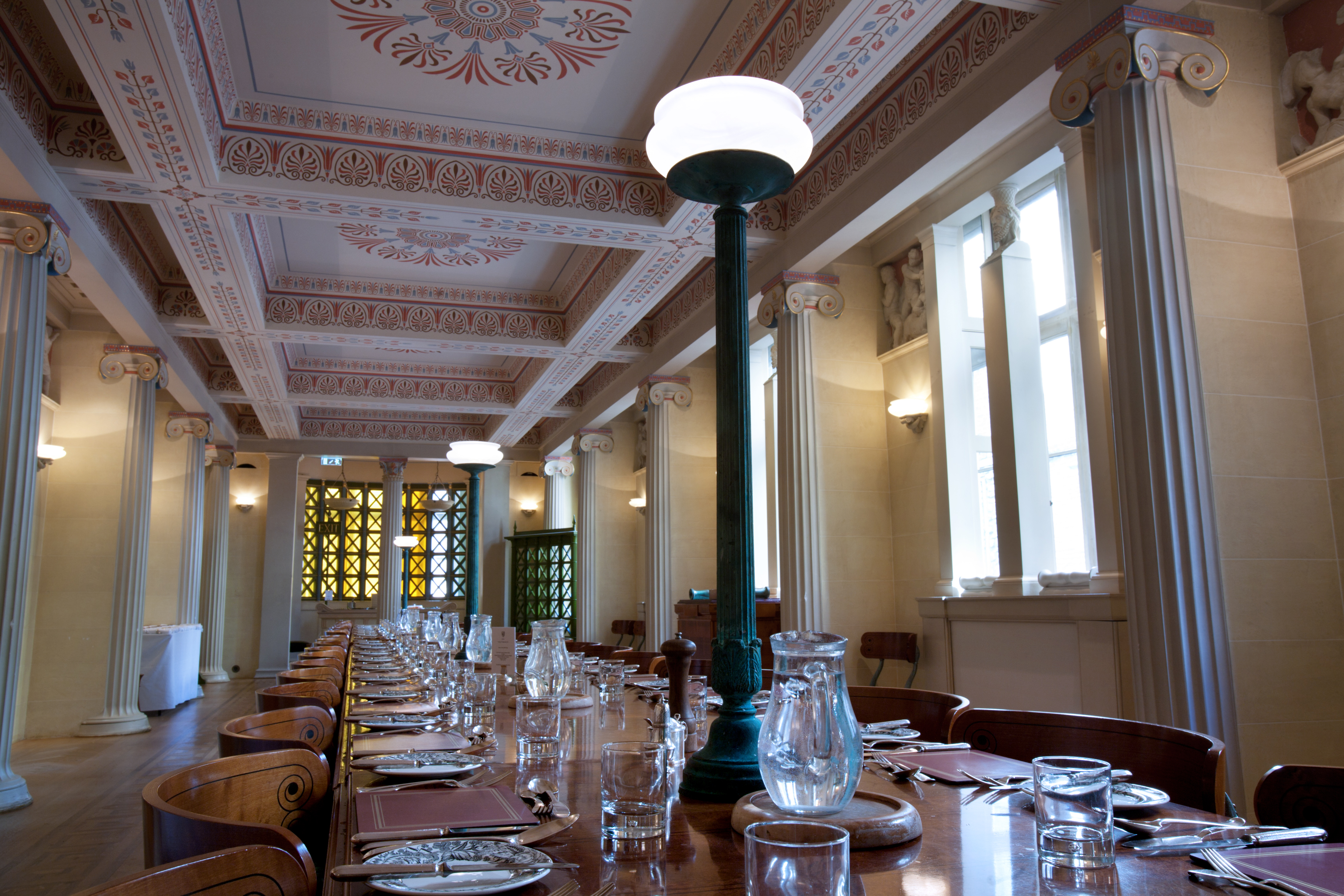
Fellows' Dining Room

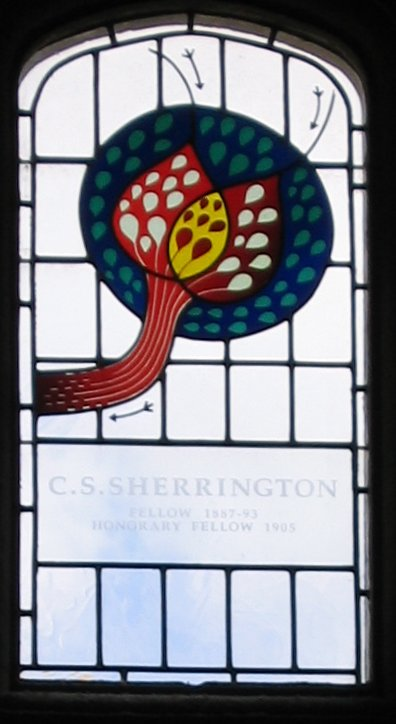
Stained-glass window in dining hall, commemorating Charles Scott Sherrington

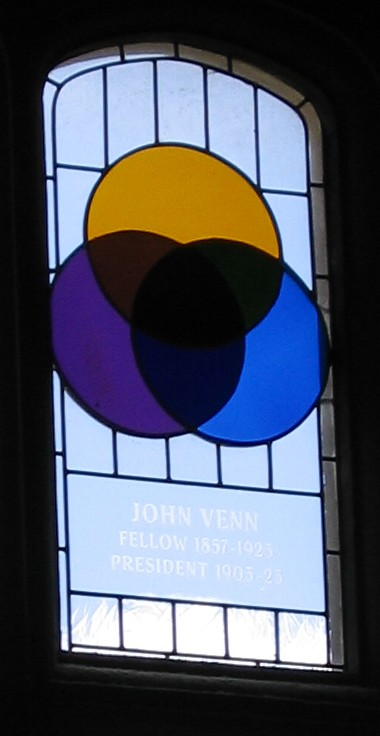
Stained-glass window in dining hall, commemorating John Venn, who invented the concept of the Venn diagram

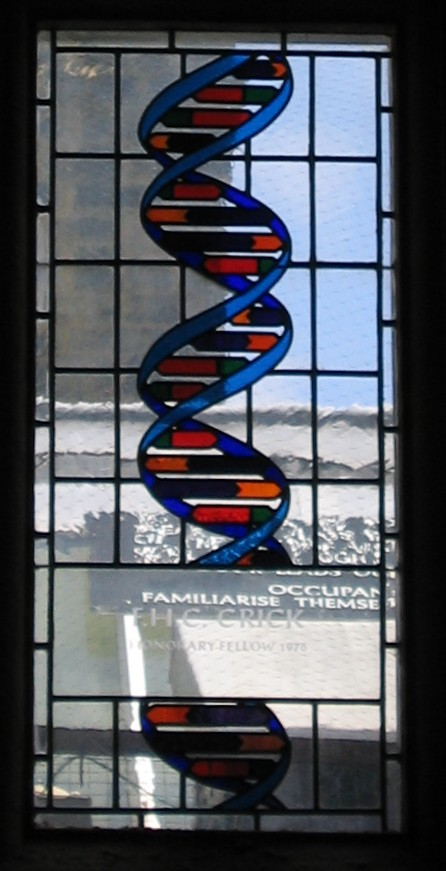
Stained-glass window in dining hall, commemorating Francis Crick, who co-discovered the molecular structure of DNA

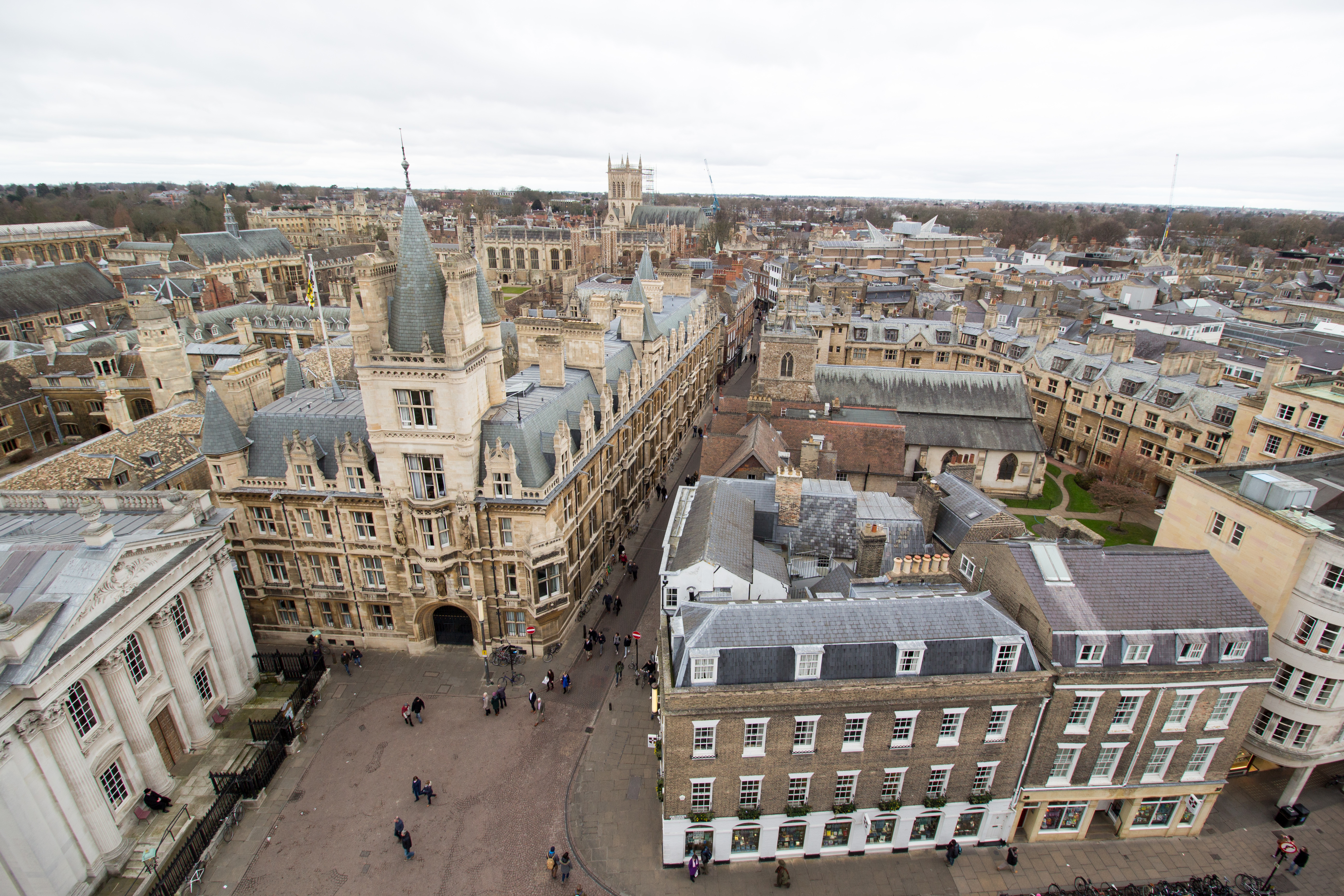
View from Great St Mary's Church

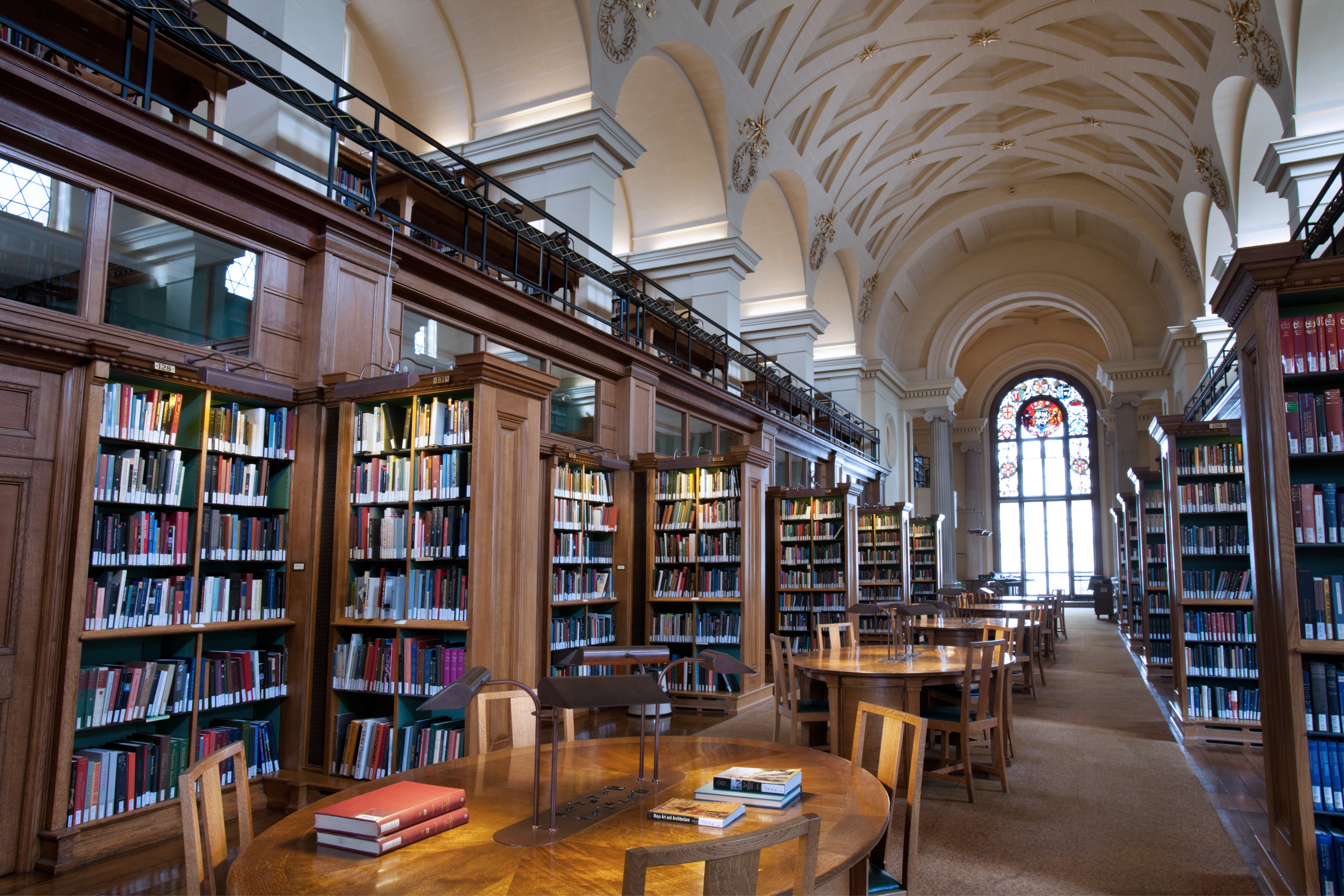
The library

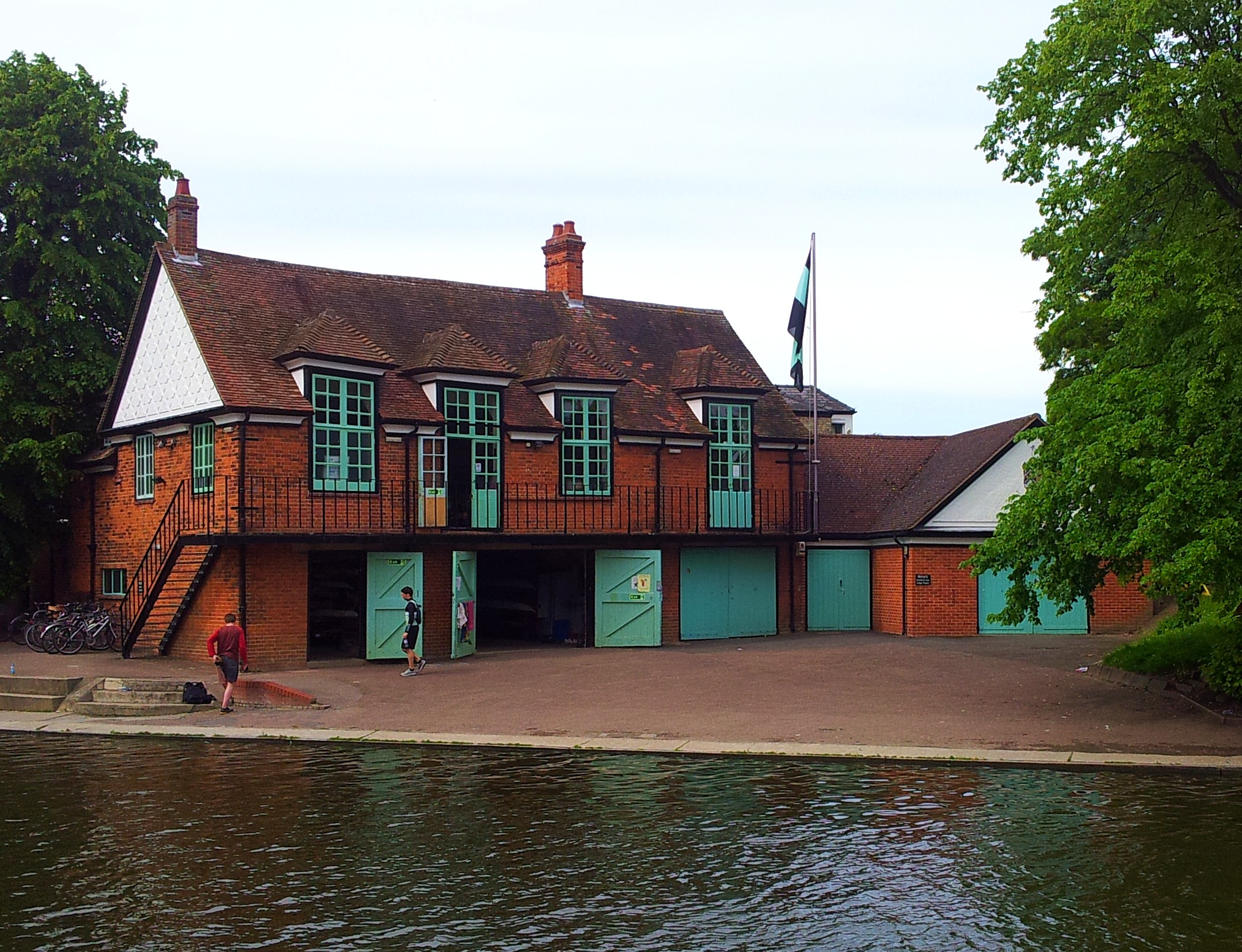
The old boathouse (demolished in 2015)

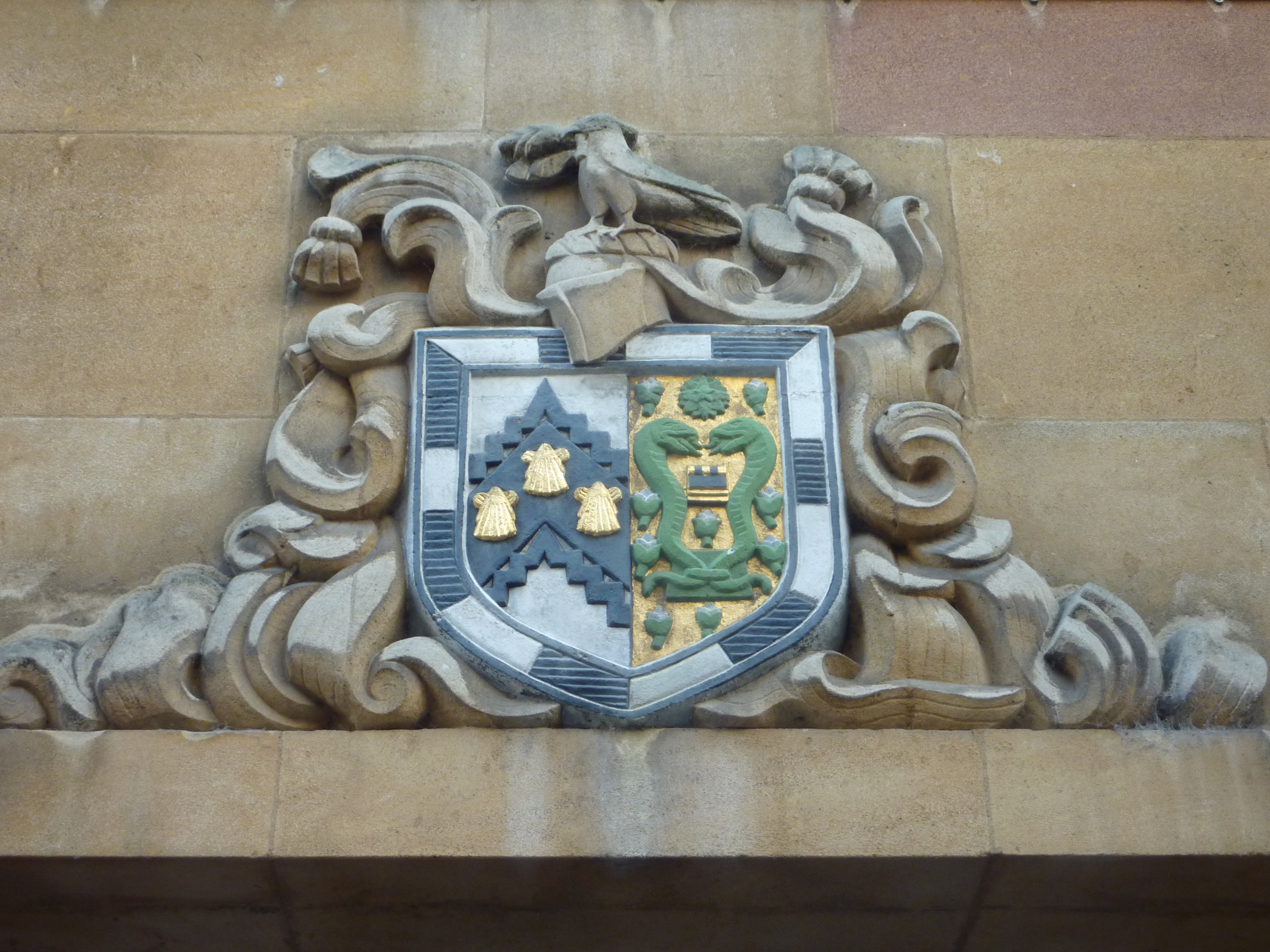
College crest

== See also ==
- Caius Boat Club
- Gonville & Caius Association Football Club
- John of Padua
- List of organ scholars
- Listed buildings in Cambridge (west)
- Sir Ronald Fisher window

== Bibliography ==
- Brooke, C. A history of Gonville and Caius College. Woodbridge, Suffolk: Boydell, 1985 (corrected reprint, 1996). ISBN 0-85115-423-9.
