= W. Metcalfe and Son =

- Industry: Printing and publishing
- Founded: 19th century
- Founder: William Metcalfe
- Headquarters: Cambridge, England

W. Metcalfe and Son was a printer and publisher in Cambridge during the 19th and early 20th centuries. Its office has been located on Green Street, Trinity Street and St Mary's Street. A large number of books about Cambridge were published by W. Metcalfe and Sons during that era. In 1836, William Metcalfe was a contender for the printer of Cambridge University Press, but was defeated by John Parker.

The Cambridge General Advertiser, first issued in 1839, was printed by William Metcalfe and Jonathan Palmer. Metcalfe continued as printer until 1846, after which it changed hands a number of times before closing in 1850.

At the moment, W Metcalfe and Sons Ltd is cooperated in Appersett.

== Books ==
- The Railway traveller's walk through Cambridge. OCLC 57685445
- Donn, James; Frederick Pursh; Cambridge Botanic Garden (1811). Hortus cantabrigiensis; or, a catalogue of plants indigenous and exotic (6th ed.). Cambridge: W. Metcalfe. OCLC 5958592.
- Cooper, Charles Henry (1852). Annals of Cambridge (Volume 4). Metcalfe & Palmer.
- Godfray, Hugh (1859). An Elementary Treatise on the Lunar Theory: with a brief sketch of the history of the problem up to the time of Newton. Cambridge: Macmillan Publishing. OCLC 9859269.
- Cooper, Charles Henry (1860–1866). Memorials of Cambridge: A New Edition (3 volumes). Cambridge: William Metcalfe. OCLC 31309671. Internet Archive
- Deck, Norris (1862). A handbook for visitors to Cambridge. Cambridge: William Metcalfe. OCLC 12911584.
- The new Cambridge guide or handbook for visitors. Cambridge: William Metcalfe. 1963.
- William Robinson; Baptist minister (1866). Biblical studies. London: Longmans, Green. OCLC 25416905.
- Deck, Norris (1868). The new Cambridge guide : with a short account of Cambridgeshire, Isle of Ely, and Wisbech (2nd ed.). Cambridge: W. Metcalfe. OCLC 18008666.
- Costumes of the University of Cambridge. Cambridge: W. Metcalfe. 1875. ISBN 0-85122-194-7. OCLC 4265384.
- Salmon, George (1882). A Treatise on the Analytic Geometry of Three Dimensions. Cambridge: W. Metcalfe. and Son. ISBN 1-4021-0018-3. Archived from the original on 1 December 2006. Reprinted in 2002 by Adamant Media. ISBN 1-4021-0018-3
- Bowling, Edward Woodley (1881). The battle of the Pons Trium Trojanorum . Cambridge: W. Metcalfe & Son. OCLC 21203107.
- Alfred Marshall (1885). Where to House the London Poor. Cambridge: W. Metcalfe and Son. OCLC 32517008.
- Bowling, Edward Woodley (1885). Sagittulae, Random Verses. Cambridge: W. Metcalfe & Son. OCLC 25002058.
- Torry, Alfred Freer (1888). Founders and benefactors of St. John's College, Cambridge with notes, chiefly biographical. Cambridge: W. Metcalfe & Son. OCLC 79443988.
- Bonney, T G (1921). Memories of a long life. OCLC 4338105.

== Periodicals ==
- The Cambridge University Magazine (1839–1842)
- Cambridge General Advertiser (1839–1846)
- Messenger of Mathematics
- The Eagle (1859–1935). OCLC 17524145

=== Annuals ===
- J W L Glaisher (1860). Various papers and notes that have appeared in the Quarterly Journal of Mathematics and the Messenger of Mathematics during the year (1878-1882). OCLC 69210138.
  - J W L Glaisher (1882). Various papers and notes, chiefly relating to elliptic functions, that have appeared in the Quarterly Journal of Mathematics and the Messenger of Mathematics, during the year 1881 and 1882. Cambridge: Metcalfe. OCLC 56863068.
  - J W L Glaisher (1855). Mathematical papers, chiefly connected with the q-series in elliptic functions, 1883-1885. Cambridge: W. Metcalfe and Son. OCLC 6362309.
