= John of Padua =

Architect at the court of Henry VIII

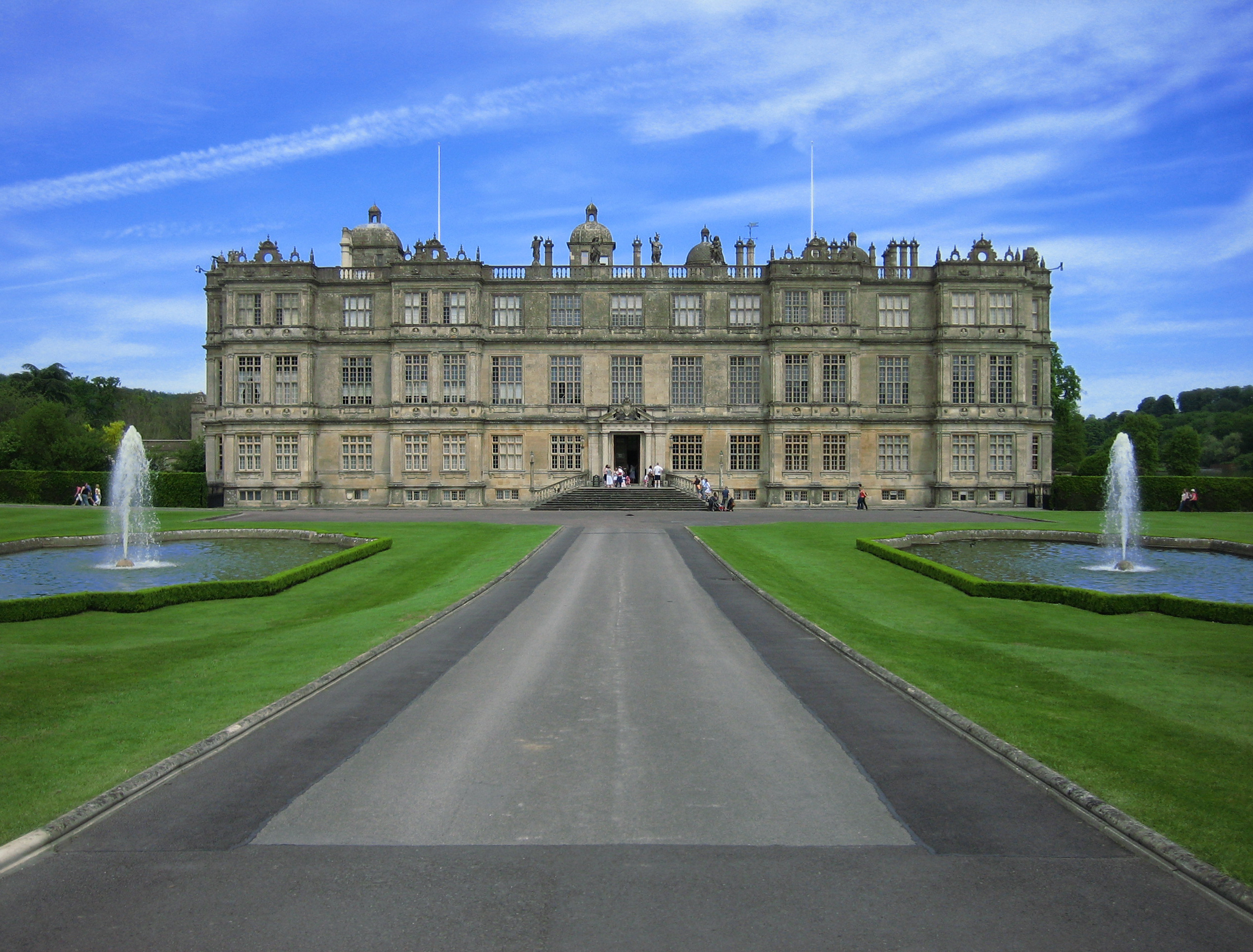
Longleat House has been attributed to, among others, John of Padua

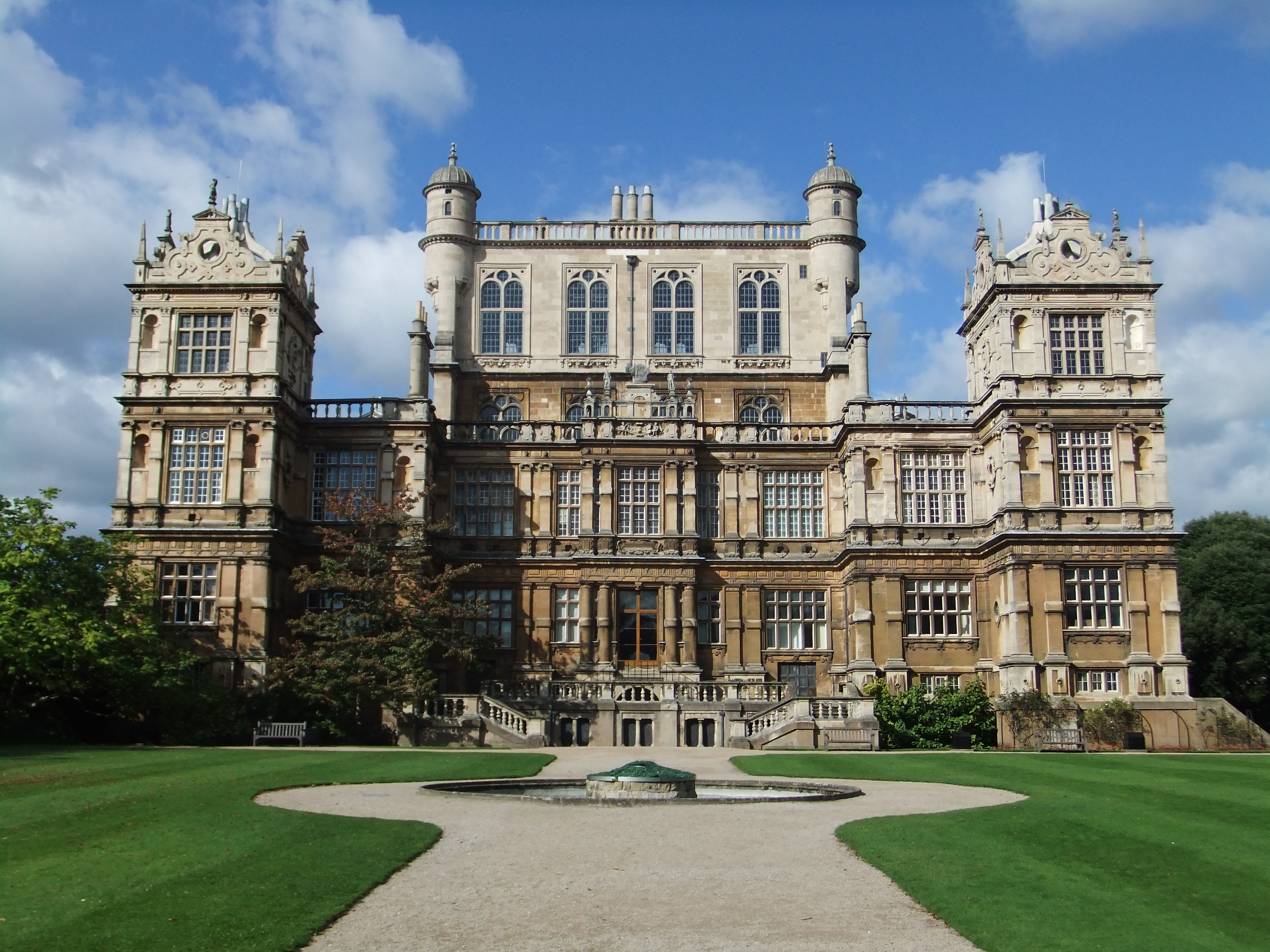
Wolaton Hall has been attributed to both John of Padua and Robert Smythson

John of Padua (recorded active between 1543 and 1557) was an elusive figure of the English Renaissance who was employed at the courts of Henry VIII and his successor, Edward VI, during a period in which numerous foreign architects and artisans arrived in England, bringing with them the new concepts and evolutions of the Italian Renaissance as it spread across Europe. He disappears from the records after 1557.

John of Padua, John Thorpe and Robert Smythson were near contemporaries all working in the currently evolving English Renaissance style in an age of often poor record keeping. As a result, their works have become blurred and there is debate over whose hand was responsible for which building, and John of Padua has become a mysterious and enigmatic figure in English architectural history. Sir John Summerson warned of this phenomenon, however, that "when it comes to the test of building accounts we find that very little indeed can be ascribed to foreign hands."

== Archival references ==
John of Padua was granted the court position of "Deviser of Buildings" in 1543 for his service to Henry VIII in architecture and music and appears as architectus in the teller's rolls and a contemporary will.

The phantom John of Padua first resurfaced in the searches made in the 18th century by the engraver and historian George Vertue in records of the Office of Works, as the poet Thomas Gray reported in a letter to his friend Horace Walpole Gray prefaced his remarks with the caveat "Mr Vertue's MSS (as I do not doubt you have experienced) will often put you on a false scent." It was Vertue who jumped to the conclusion that John of Padua designed Somerset House and Longleat, Burroughs, the Master of Caius College, had told Gray: "That it was from the similitude of style in those buildings and in the four gates of Keys College, he had imagined the latter to be also the work of John of Padua, and this was all the proof he had of it. Upon looking at these gates I plainly see that they might very well be the work of one man. From the College books I find that the east side, in which are the Portae Virtutis and Sapientiae, was built in 1566 and 1576." Gray goes on to quote a Latin entry in the books of 1575, ascribing the design of the Gate of Honour (Porta Honoris) to Dr Caius himself instead (quam Doctor Caius (dum viveret) Architecto praescripserat elaborata). From this John of Padua appeared in Walpole's Anecdotes of Painting, with the ascription to him of Somerset House and Longleat.

== Work and attributions ==
Until the mid-twentieth century, John of Padua was credited with the design of some of England's most notable 16th-century Renaissance domestic buildings. However, much of his attributed work was executed after records of him had ceased, and today the extent of his input is debated.

In 1544, Padua was created by royal patent "Devisor of His Majesty's Buildings", a unique office held by no one else, distinct from that of "Surveyor", which suggests he was involved in military designs. The most notable, but still undocumented of Padua's commissions, was the now demolished Somerset House begun in 1546.

As the result of the poor documentation surrounding John of Padua, little is reliably known of his work outside of royal patronage. Today, though as Summerson said, "nearly every classical work of the mid-Tudor period has, at some time, been given to him," (Summerson 1963:347) no standing building is solely and reliably attributed to him; Amongst the many buildings where work has been attributed to him are Charlecote House, Holdenby House, Longleat House, Wollaton Hall. and Caius College, Cambridge. He has also been credited with the design of Montacute House however, this is unlikely and today, the house is more often attributed to the mason, William Arnold, who was responsible for the designs of Cranborne Manor and Wadham College, Oxford, and had worked at Dunster Castle, also in Somerset. Whatever the truth of Padua's input to these buildings, their common architectural factors are their Renaissance elements.

The case for John of Padua being the architect of Longleat House is stronger; The 1946 Times obituary of the Marquess of Bath describes John of Padua as the architect of Bath's country home Longleat House, the house it describes as an "Italian palace in an English park". John of Padua's name is also mentioned in an account book for the building of the house dated 1568. The house is, however, also attributed to the architect Robert Smythson, who like Padua often worked in the robust Renaissance style which evolved in England during the 16th century.

W. Wilkins thought "John of Padua" was an alias for the patron of Caius College, Cambridge, John Caius (1510-1573), who had studied at Padua, who returned from a Continental tour in 1543, the year "John of Padua" appears in the royal records, and who was capable of producing classicising designs, as in the gates to the college he refounded. It has even been suggested that John of Padua and John Thorpe were one and the same person, which Summerson dismissed. There is currently little conclusive evidence to support other speculations identifying him as various Italian musicians and artisans with similar names.

In his first novel, Vivian Grey, Benjamin Disraeli cites John of Padua as one of the architectural influences on Château Desir, the fictional seat of the Marquess of Carabas: "Here too the arabesques, which, at the time of the building of the Château, had been recently introduced into England by Hans Holbein and John of Padua."
