= The Eagle (magazine) =

Publication of St John's College, University of Cambridge

The Eagle, founded in 1859, is the annual review of St John's College, Cambridge.

The poet Thomas Ashe founded The Eagle in the year in which he graduated from St John's., with the help of a college fellow, Joseph Bickersteth Mayor. Henry George Hart (1843–1921) and Robert Forsyth Scott (1849–1933) were later editors of the magazine.

Samuel Butler wrote for The Eagle.

== History ==
- 1859-1935 : Published by W. Metcalfe ^{OCLC 17524145}
- 1959- : Published annually by St. John's College ^{OCLC 70910081}

Since 1981, a supplement has also been published. ^{OCLC 55869791}

Between 1889 and 1915, some of the records from the Cambridge Archives were printed in the magazine.
