= St John's Street, Cambridge =

Street in Cambridge, England

Coordinates: 52.2074°N 0.118°E

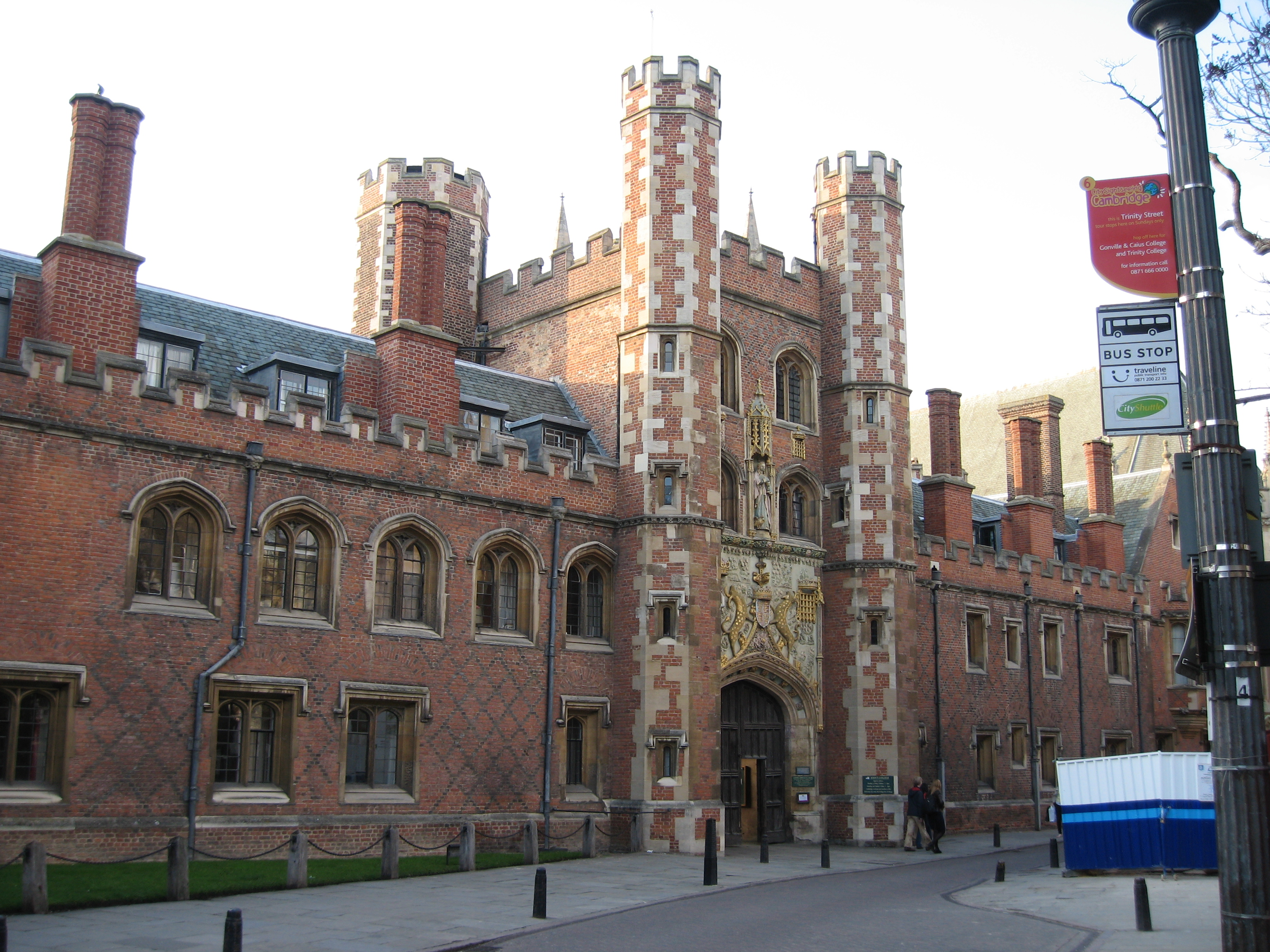
St John's College gatehouse in St John's Street.

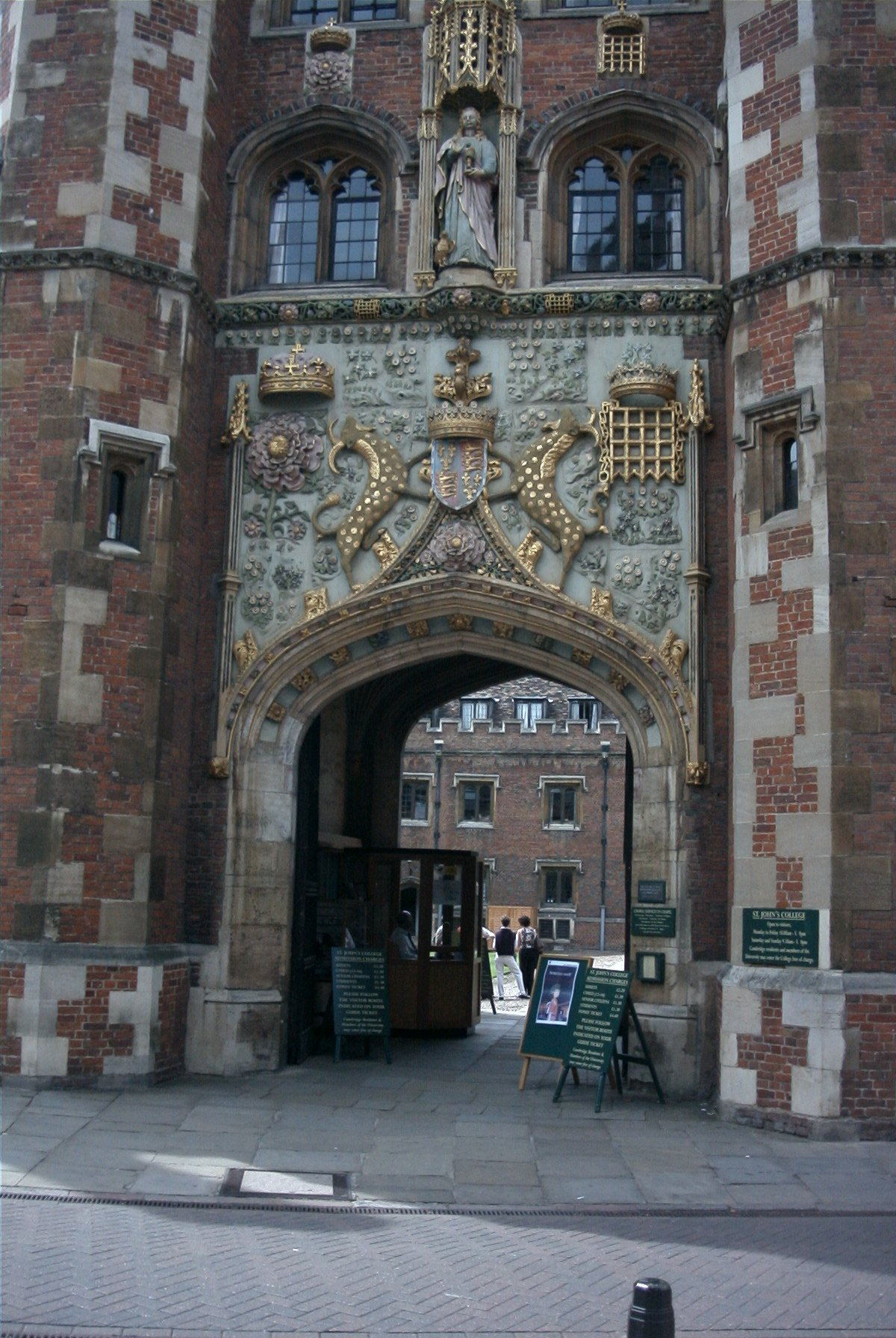
The main gatehouse entrance of St John's College, on St John's Street.

St John's Street is a historical street in central Cambridge, England. The street links with Bridge Street, Round Church Street, and Sidney Street to the north. It continues to the south as Trinity Street, then King's Parade and Trumpington Street. This thoroughfare is the main area for some of the most historic University of Cambridge colleges.

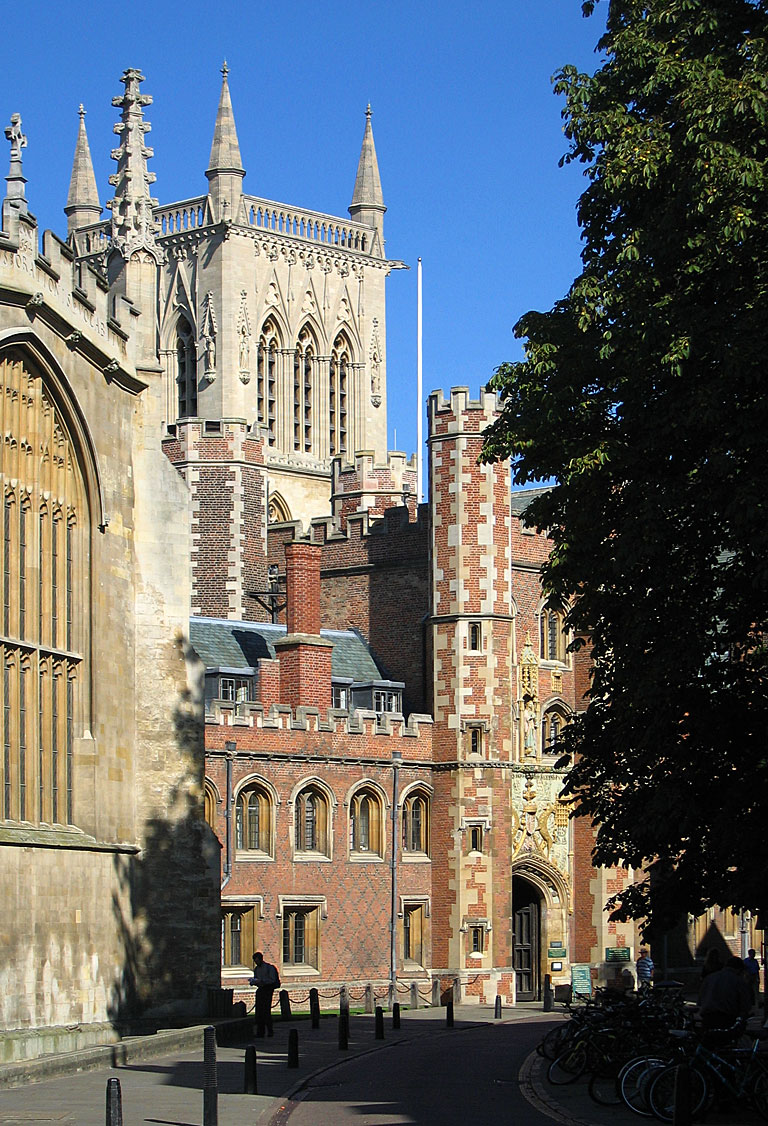
Looking north along St John's Street, with the gatehouse of St John's College on the west side of the street and the tower of the college chapel behind.

St John's College is located on the west side of the street, hence the name. The college has an impressive crenellated gatehouse entrance and the tower of the chapel dominates the scene at the north of the street.

A medieval church, All Saints Jewry, stood in St John's Street. It was rebuilt in 1820 and then demolished in 1865. The site remains a green space. All Saints is now located in Jesus Lane, to the east.

On the east side of the street is the old School of Divinity, built between 1878 and 1879 by Basil Champneys for the Faculty of Divinity on land leased by St John's College. Control of the building reverted to St John's when the faculty of divinity moved to the Sidgwick Site in 2000. The old School of Divinity is now part of the All Saints' Yard of St John's.
