= Trinity Street, Cambridge =

Street in England

Trinity Street
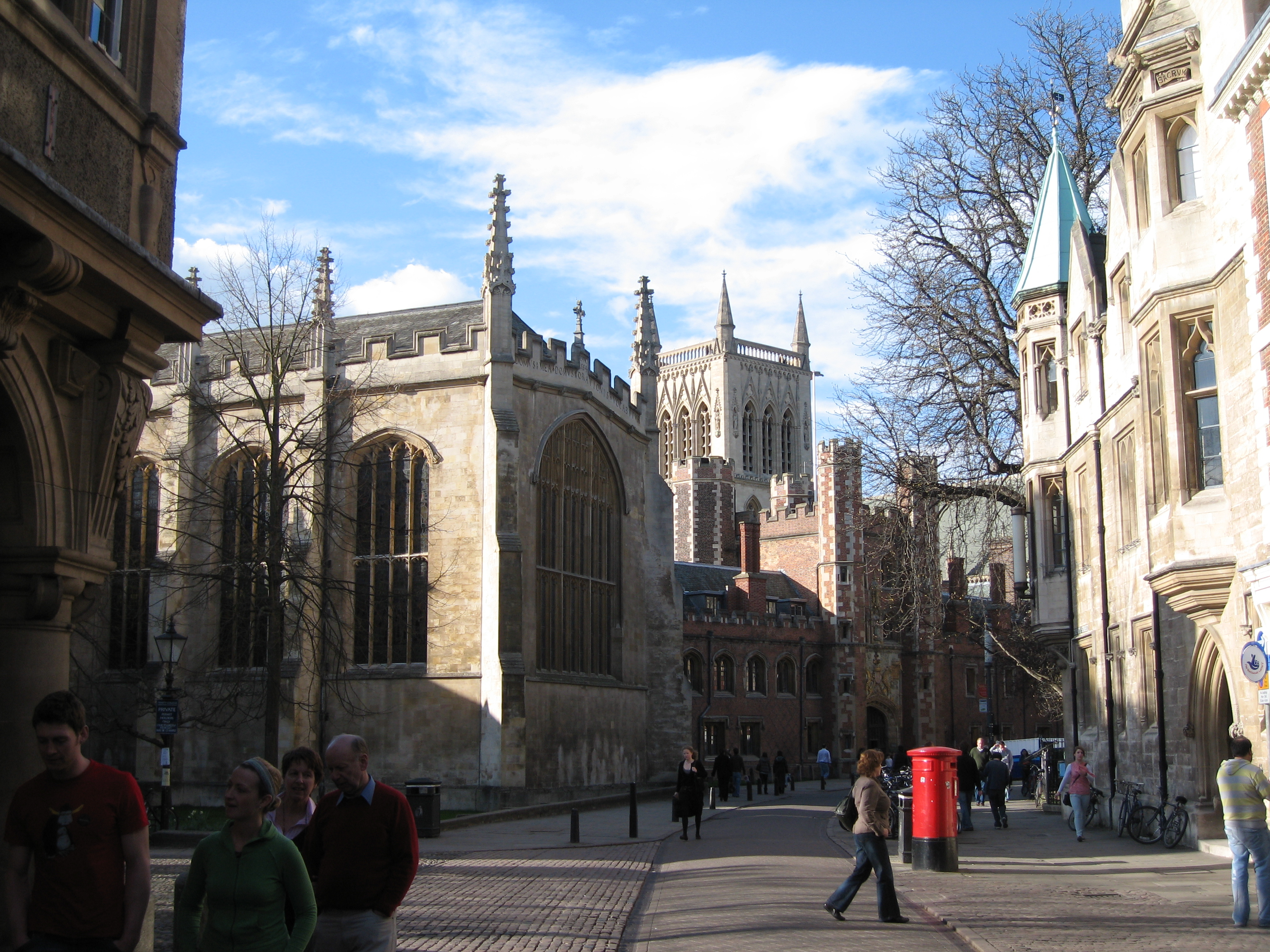
- Looking north along Trinity Street, with Trinity College on the left and the tower of St John's College in the distance.
- Interactive map of Trinity Street
- Former name: High Street
- Location: Cambridge, England
- Coordinates: 52.2063°N 0.1182°E
- North end: St John's Street
- South end: King's Parade

Trinity Street (formerly the High Street) is a street in central Cambridge, England. The street continues north as St John's Street, and south as King's Parade and then Trumpington Street.

The street is named after Trinity College, which is on its west side. Also on the street, just to the south, is Gonville and Caius College. St Michael's and St Mary's Courts in Gonville and Caius lie across Trinity Street on land surrounding St Michael's Church. St Michael's Court was completed in the 1930s when its south side was built.

Trinity Lane leads off Trinity Street to the west, between Trinity College and Gonville and Caius, turning south around the back of Gonville and Caius, which leads to Trinity Hall and Clare College.

== History ==
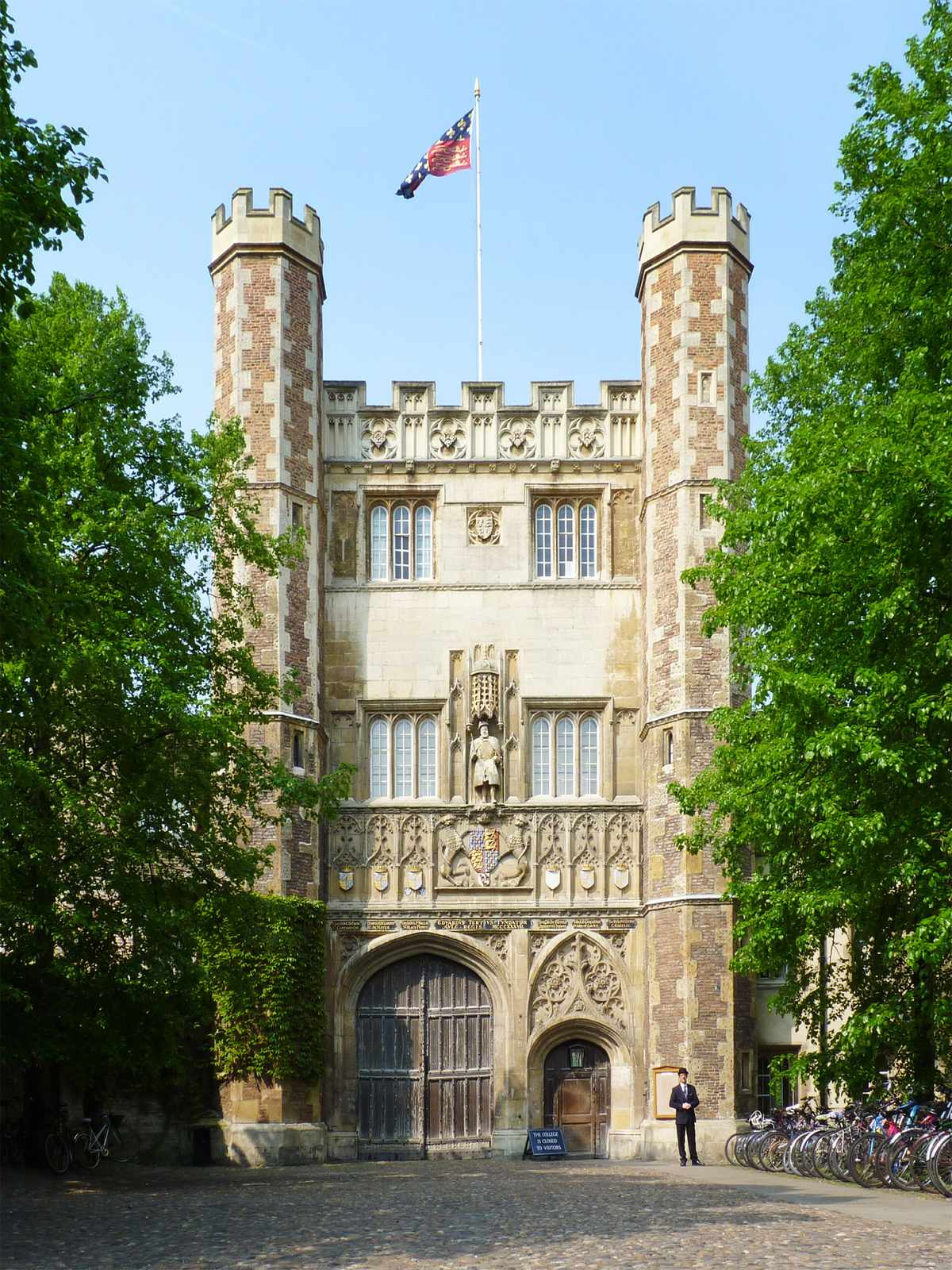
The Great Gate of Trinity College on Trinity Street.

Michaelhouse, a former college of the University of Cambridge, was established on Michaelmas Day 1324. It was named after the parish church of St Michael on the magna strata or High Street, as Trinity Street was then known. Michaelhouse was combined with King's Hall to form Trinity College in 1546.

Bowes & Bowes was a bookshop and publishing company at 1 Trinity Street, on the corner of King's Parade. It had a claim to be the oldest bookshop in the United Kingdom, since books had been sold on the site since 1581. Bowes & Bowes closed in 1986 and its successor, Sherratt & Hughes, closed in 1992. Since then the site has been occupied by the Cambridge University Press bookshop.

The Victorian printer and publisher W. Metcalfe and Son was located in Trinity Street before moving to the adjoining St Mary's Street.

Heffers bookshop is on the east side of Trinity Street. It is now part of Blackwell's.

The Hawks' Club, a social club founded in 1872 for sportsmen at the university, was originally in Trinity Street, but by the 1890s it had moved to a property owned by St John's College in All Saints' Passage.

== Panoramic view ==
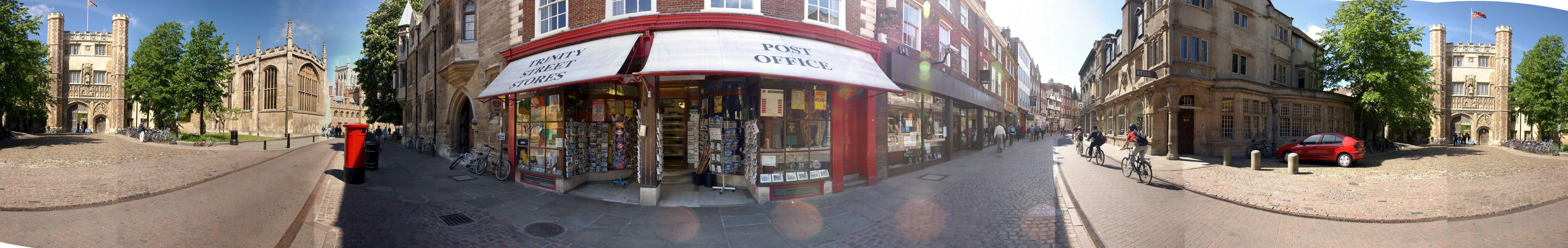
Panoramic view of Trinity Street, 2007
