= Edward Gibbons =

English composer and choirmaster (1568–1650)

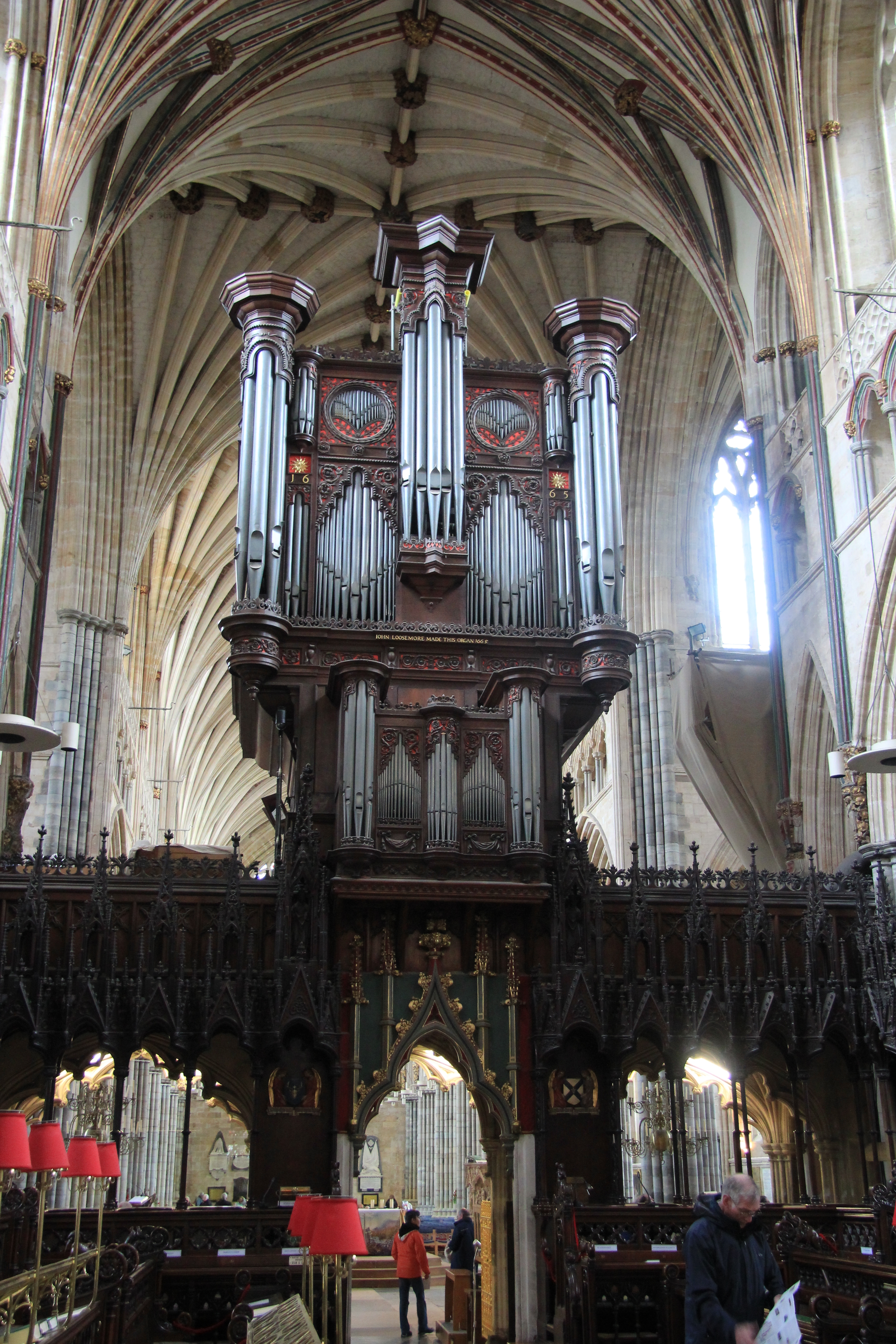
- The organ at Exeter Cathedral, which Gibbons may have played
- Born: Cambridge
- Baptised: 21 March 1568; Holy Trinity Church, Cambridge
- Died: In or before July 1650
- Occupations: Composer; choirmaster
- Relatives: Orlando Gibbons (Brother); Ellis Gibbons (Brother); Christopher Gibbons (Nephew)

Edward Gibbons (Note: Edward Gibbons himself preferred the spelling "Gibbins".) (bapt. 21 March 1568 – in or before July 1650) was an English choirmaster and composer of the late Renaissance and early Baroque periods. Born in Cambridge, Gibbons's youth is completely unknown, but he later received degrees from the Universities of Cambridge and Oxford. From 1591/92 to 1598 he worked at King's College, Cambridge, as a lay clerk and choirmaster. During his tenure he married Jane, with whom he had six children. Gibbons's whereabouts the next few years remain uncertain; he may have lived in Acton, Bristol or Exeter, but by 1607 he was the choirmaster of the Exeter Cathedral, where the choristers included Matthew Locke. By 1609 Gibbons received a special dispensation to become a priest vicar, becoming the head of the college of priest-vicars and succentor. Jane died in 1628, and Edward married Mary Bluet; the family was evicted from their home during the English Civil War, but moved to their estate in Dunsford.

A few compositions of Gibbons survive: an organ prelude, two verse anthems, two works for viol consorts, and some sacred music. Of these, commentators have mainly praised the verse anthems, How hath ye City sate solitary and What Strikes the Clocke? Musicologist John Harley called the former particularly moving, and it was likely written for the 1603 London plague outburst to which Gibbons's brother Ellis may have succumbed to. Edward is the elder brother of the better-known Orlando; after the early deaths of Orlando and his wife, Edward cared for their son, Christopher, who also became a noted composer.

== Life and career ==
=== Youth and education ===
Edward Gibbons was born to William (c. 1540 – 1595) and Mary (d. 1603) Gibbons in Cambridge and baptised on 21 March 1568 at Church of St Mary the Great, Cambridge. (Note: The maiden name of Edward's mother is unknown.) At the time early baptisms were commonplace, so his actual date of birth was likely shortly before 21 March. He was the first surviving son of a musical family, (Note: The first son, Richard, died as an infant.) where his father William was a member of the Cambridge waits. His brother Ellis was born 1573 and later became a composer, while 1581/82 saw the birth of Ferdinando, who eventually took William's place as wait. Orlando, who would become the most famous musician of the family, was born in 1583 in Oxford, although Edward and Ellis were still living in Cambridge at that time. Nothing is known of Edward Gibbons's childhood education. (Note: John Harley noted that Gibbons's later job as choirmaster in 1591/92 meant he learned the necessary skills for the post earlier in his life.)

The 17th-century biographer Anthony Wood reported that he received a Bachelor of Music from the University of Cambridge and that he was "incorporated in the same degree" at the University of Oxford on 7 July 1592. Records indicate that from at least March 1591/92 and until the Michaelmas term of 1598 he worked as a lay clerk at King's College, Cambridge. He was also choirmaster there—succeeding Thomas Hammond—for about the same period, during which Orlando was a choirboy at some point. By 1596, Edward married Jane, a wealthy woman related a to an otherwise unknown 'Lord Spencer'. The couple had six children: Robert (bapt. 1 July 1597, perhaps died in infancy); Mary (bapt. 11 April 1599); Jane; Joan (buried 19 June 1627); William (bapt. 24 October 1607); and Murrey (buried 28 February 1636).

=== Exeter and later life ===
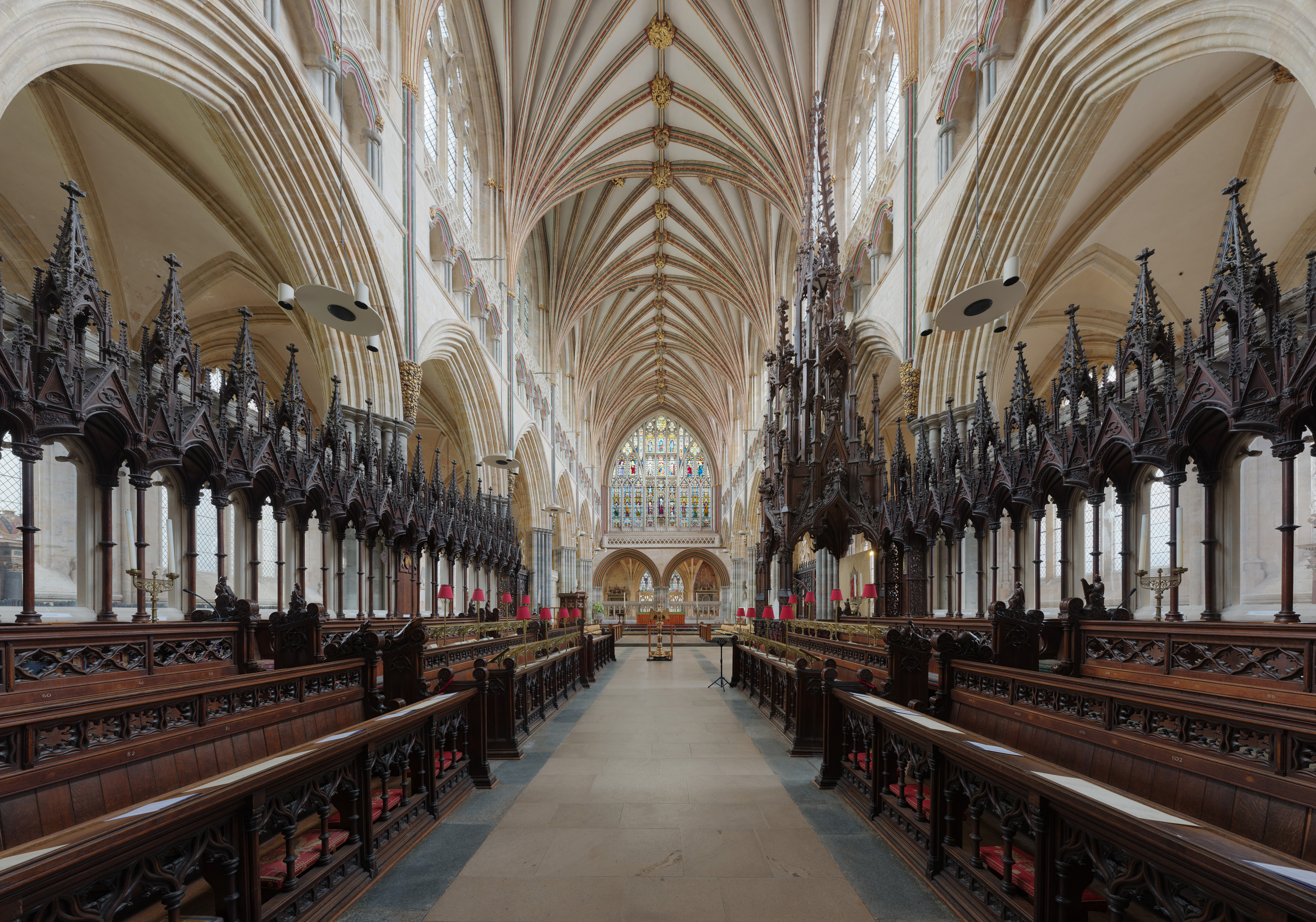
The choir of Exeter Cathedral, where Gibbons taught choristers from 1608 to no earlier than 1645

By 1598, Hammond likely resumed his position as choirmaster, with Gibbons's subsequent whereabouts being uncertain for a few years. At no point was he the organist of Bristol Cathedral as Wood and other early biographies record. (Note: Although most of these biographies were probably repeating on Wood's initial account.) (Note: See note 91 in Harley (1999, pp. 15–16) for a comprehensive overview of the history of sources reporting on Gibbons's purported Bristol post.) Modern musicologists do not accept this claim since the detailed surviving records of Bristol do not include Gibbons's name. (Note: Fellowes speculated that the recording of such a post may originate from Gibbons's later position as succentor of Exeter, where his duties may have included organ-playing.) Musicologist Edmund Fellowes noted, however, that "It is not impossible that he may have been organist of one of the city churches in Bristol, for the tradition is of early origin". Gibbons is known to have lived in Exeter by 1607, as his son William was baptised there on 24 October 1607. Gibbons's mother died in April 1603, and his brother Ellis two months later; in Ellis's will, Edward Gibbons is recorded as "of Acton", presumably Acton, London. However, no records of his activity there exist, (Note: Fellowes noted that it the description may have simply meant he owned property there.) and it is possible that 'Acton' is a typo for 'Exeter', meaning that Gibbons could have settled in Exeter as early as 1603. (Note: Such typos were considerably common in the copying wills to the probate register. See note 117 in Harley (1999, p. 19)) William Cotton had become Bishop of Exeter on 12 November 1598, and according to 18th-century historian John Walker, Cotton urged Gibbons to come to Exeter Cathedral at this time. This suggests Gibbons moved to Exeter immediately after his 1598 leave from King's, which would create a logical chronology of this period. From 25 June 1608 on, Gibbons taught choristers at the Exeter Cathedral, with a salary of 50 and a quarter shillings split between him and the organist John Lugge. From 1638 to 1641, and perhaps earlier, the future composer Matthew Locke was among his choristers. Records suggest that Gibbons often put his subordinate Greenwood Randall in charge. Some of Gibbons's few surviving compositions were probably written by this time.

External audio
- Nomine (arranged for recorder quintet) performed by the Consortium5
- Nomine

On 8 August 1609 Gibbons became a vicar—a parish priest, as opposed to a rector—for Exeter. Because he was a layman, a special dispensation was required (submitted on 25 March 1609), which described him as "unmatched skill and skill in music and singing". (Note: Translated as "unmatched skill and skill in music and singing" from the original Latin: "ac scientia in arte musica & cantandi perititia singularis") Gibbons may have received said position because of his association with Cotton, who was known for patronage toward his family and colleagues. By 1614 Gibbons had become head (custos) of the college of priest-vicars and succentor by 1615, the latter position being due to a mandate by Archbishop George Abbot. As succentor, Gibbons may have been responsible for playing organ during services. Two other priests filed a joint-complaint in 1617, accusing Gibbons of neglecting his duties. Gibbons "relinquished" his position as succentor on 15 December 1627, but the complaint was repeated in 1634. Though it was not unprecedented for a layman to be a vicar priest, the complaints may have stemmed from the other priests's dissatisfaction of his humble origins. Regardless, records indicate—up to 24 May 1640—that Gibbons continued an association with the choir.

Orlando died on 5 June 1625, and his wife followed the next year. Gibbons and Jane assumed responsibility of their children, a task made easier by Jane's wealth. Among their adopted children was the future composer Christopher Gibbons, who continued the musical study with Edward Gibbons and may have played the organ at Exeter Cathedral. Jane died sometime the next year, being buried on 7 April 1628, and Gibbons married Mary Bluet, who was also wealthy. Walker relays that during the English Civil War Gibbons rejected a £500 demand from the Parliamentary Commissioner so he and his family were evicted from their home. However, Gibbons owned an estate in Dunsford, where his family settled. The last payment records connecting him to the cathedral are from 1644/45. Though the circumstances of his death are largely unknown, he seems to have died before July 1650, the month where the administration of his estate was given to someone else. It is not known where Gibbons was buried.

== Music ==
External audio
- What Strikes the Clocke? (arranged for recorder quintet) performed by the Seldom Sene
- What Strikes the Clocke?

Edward Gibbons's few surviving compositions cover vocal, instrumental and keyboard music. The musicologist John Harley characterises his oeuvre as "competent, and occasionally moving". His only keyboard work is the relatively short Prelude in D minor for organ. The composer Thomas Tudway recorded it as "A Prelude upon ye Organ as was then usuall [sic] before ye Anthem", suggesting that it was meant to be played before the anthem for the Morning and Evening prayers at church. The anthem in question may be Gibbons's own, the verse anthem How hath ye City sate solitary for two alto soloists, choir and a small ensemble. The work's text does not survive completely, but is seemingly adapted and modified from Lamentations 1 of the Book of Lamentations. Given that the work includes lines such as "by the late plague and dreadful visitation", it seems likely that it was written after a bout of the plague. Harley suggests that if the event in question was the 1603 outbreak in London, then "the words have a highly personal application", as they may refer to the death of Gibbons's brother Ellis that year. Harley describes the anthem as "genuinely moving." Both the Prelude and How hath ye City sate solitary are associated with the year 1611 by Tudway, though it remains unclear whether Tudway was referring to the year of composition or the year when Gibbons's obtained the cutos position.

Besides the anthem, Gibbons's other surviving sacred music is settings of the 'Commandements and Creed' as well as the Credo for one alto, two tenor and two bass soloists. The movements were likely meant as an addition to the Benedictus and Te Deum from William Mundy's Short Service. Also surviving is the short 3-part verse anthem Awake and arise, most of which's text is lost, though Harley noted that "this does not disguise the animation of the short piece". His two extant instrumental works are Nomine and What Strikes the Clocke? for five and three viols respectively. These works are described by Harley, as routine and "workmanlike". The musicologist John Milsom considers What Strikes the Clocke? similar to Charles Butler's Dial Song and Parsley's Clock by Osbert Parsley, as all three works center around a line that counts the hours.

Edward Gibbons's brother Ellis wrote two madrigals for The Triumphs of Oriana collection: Long live faire Oriana and Round about her Charret. The reason for this is unclear; only the editor of the set, Thomas Morley, also contributed more than a single work. (Note: See Ellis Gibbons § Music for further information on this oddity.) To explain this, the musicologist Joseph Kerman speculated that Edward was the actual author of one of these works, albeit without more than circumstantial evidence. Works by Edward Gibbons have been recorded at least twice, by two recorder quintet groups; Seldom Sene recorded What Strikes the Clocke?, while Consortium5 recorded Nomine.

== Works ==
List of compositions by Edward Gibbons
Title	Genre	Instrumentation	Key	Manuscript source: Folios (Note: "v" and "r" stand for verso and recto respectively; in left-right language books, verso is the front page while recto is the back page.)	RISM No.
Prelude	Prelude	Organ	D minor	BL. Harleian MS ff. 193v–194r	RISM 800243988
How hath ye City sate solitary (Note: Also transmitted as How doth the city sit solitary)	Verse anthem	Two alto soloists, choir and orchestra (Note: The instrumental parts are presumably for viols, though other instruments likely doubled the soloists.)	D minor	BL. Harleian MS 7340 ff. 194r–199v	RISM 800243986
Commandments and Creed, and Credo	Credo	ATTBB	?	Christ Church, Oxford Mus. 1220–1224	–
Awake and arise	Verse anthem	Three voices	G major	Christ Church, Oxford Mus. 43, f. 24r	RISM 800002664
Nomine	Consort (In Nomine)	Five viols	?	Bodleian Library, Mus Sch. d.212–216	–
What Strikes the Clocke?	Consort	Three viols	A minor	Durham Dean and Chapter Library Hunter MS 33	RISM 806929140
No other works by Edward Gibbons survive
