= The Squire's Tale =

Part of the Canterbury Tales

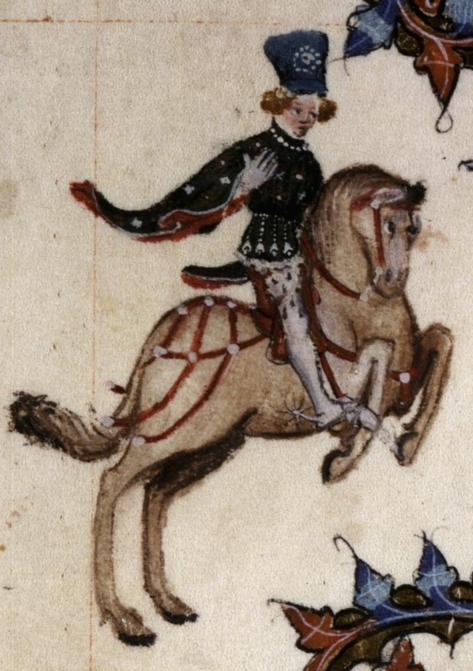
The Squire, from the Ellesmere manuscript

"The Squire's Tale" is a tale in Geoffrey Chaucer's The Canterbury Tales. It is unfinished, because it is interrupted by the next story-teller, the Franklin, who then continues with his own prologue and tale. The Squire is the Knight's son, a novice warrior and lover with more enthusiasm than experience. His tale is an epic romance, which, if completed, would probably have been longer than the rest of the Tales combined. It contains many literary allusions and vivid descriptions.

The original source of the tale remains unknown. According to some critics the source of the tale is The Arabian Nights.

== Plot ==
Genghis Khan ("Cambyuskan" in Chaucer's version) leads the Mongol Empire with two sons, Algarsyf and Cambalo, and a daughter, Canace. At the twentieth anniversary of his reign, he holds a feast, and a strange knight sent from "the kyng of Arabe and of Inde" approaches him bearing gifts, a motif common in Arthurian legends. These are a brass horse with the power of teleportation, a mirror which can reveal the minds of the king's friends and enemies, a ring which confers understanding of the language of birds (as some legends say King Solomon owned), and a sword which deals deadly wounds that only its touch can heal again (both the spear of Achilles and the Holy Lance have these powers). After much learned talk of the gifts, digressing into astrology, the first part of the tale ends.

A subplot of the tale deals with Canace and her ring. Eagerly rising the next morning, she goes on a walk and discovers a grieving falcon. The falcon tells Canace that she has been abandoned by her false lover, a tercelet (male hawk), who left her for a kite. (In medieval falconry, kites were birds of low status.) Canace heals the bird and builds a mew, or coop for it, which is painted on the outside blue for true faith within and green for falsity, and with pictures of deceitful birds. (This description of deceitful birds is similar to the images painted on the garden walls in the Romance of the Rose.)

The second part ends with a promise of more to come involving Genghis Khan's sons and the quest of Cambalo to win Canace as his wife. When the Squire briefly describes the third part of the story that he is about to tell, there is a hint that in it Canace and her brothers will commit incest, as happens in John Gower's version of the story. However, it is unlikely that Chaucer intended to finish the tale. Instead the Franklin breaks into the beginning of the third section with elaborate praise of the Squire's gentility—the Franklin being something of a social climber—and proceeds to his own tale.

== Criticism and continuations ==
Early critics were admiring of the Squire's tale. John Milton was convinced that Chaucer had intended to conclude it. Authors of the Elizabethan period, including Edmund Spenser, used characters from the tale in their own works; some, like John Lane, wrote complete continuations of it.

In general, modern critics have not paid it much attention, and consider it Chaucer's way of poking gentle fun at the young Squire's love of romance literature, which frequently contains somewhat pretentious digressions, and his lack of narrative self-control. Compared to the tale told by his father, the Knight, which is formal, serious, and complete, the rambling and fantastical story shows the Squire's inexperience. Some critics see the gifts as symbolic of the powers of poetry, which the Squire is still learning to use.

There is no clear source for the story, which is a collection of ideas and themes from many romances, as befits the Squire, a lover of such literature. The extravagant details on Eastern kingdoms come from the travel literature of the time, such as Giovanni da Pian del Carpine, Simon of St Quentin and John Mandeville. The episode of the falcon and the tercelet is similar to part of Anelida and Arcite, an early work of Chaucer's.

== See also ==
- The Ebony Horse – Folk tale of the Arabian Nights
