= Facey =

Facey is a surname. Notable people with the surname include:

- Albert Facey (1894–1982), Australian writer and World War I veteran, whose main work was his autobiography, A Fortunate Life
- Danny Facey, Grenadian international footballer who plays for English club Ossett Town, as a striker
- Delroy Facey (born 1980), British-Grenadian professional footballer
- Fred Facey (1930–2003), American radio and television announcer
- Hugh Facey, also known as Hugh Facy or Hugh Facio, (fl. 1618), English composer from the Renaissance
- Simone Facey (born 1985), Jamaican sprinter who specializes in the 100 metres
- Tom Facey, Democratic member of the Montana Legislature

== See also ==
- Bev Facey Community High School, public high school for grades 10–12 in Sherwood Park, Alberta
- Harvey v Facey, contract law case decided by the United Kingdom Judicial Committee of the Privy Council
