= William Cobbold =

William Cobbold may refer to:

- Nevill Cobbold (William Nevill Cobbold, 1863–1922), English footballer
- William Cobbold (composer) (1560–1639), English composer
