= John Lane (poet) =

English poet

John Lane (fl. 1620) was an English poet. A good friend of John Milton the elder, he lacked university education. He published two poems, Tom Tel-troths Message and his Pens Complaint (1600), which was satirical, and An Elegie vpon the Death of the high and renowned Princesse our late Soueraigne Elizabeth (1603). He left a continuation of The Squire's Tale in manuscript, in two different versions, both now in the Bodleian Library (MS. Douce 170 and MS. Ashmole 53, part).
