= The Franklin's Tale =

Part of the Canterbury Tales

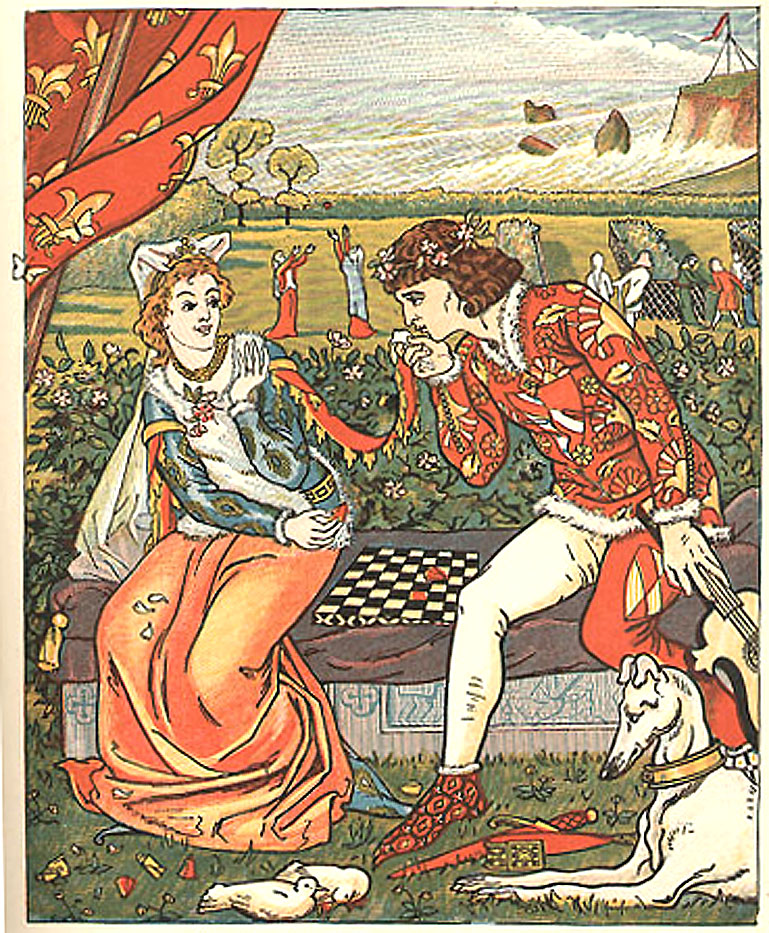
Dorigen and Aurelius, from Mrs. Haweis's, Chaucer for Children (1877). Note the black rocks in the sea and the setting of the garden, a typical site for courtly love.

"The Franklin's Tale" (Middle English: The Frankeleyns Tale) is one of The Canterbury Tales by Geoffrey Chaucer. It focuses on issues of providence, truth, generosity and gentillesse in human relationships.

== Synopsis ==
A medieval franklin was free, non-serf yet did not have noble status, and this pilgrim's words when interrupting The Squire are often seen as displaying his sense of an inferior social status.

The story opens and closes by recounting how two lovers, Arveragus and Dorigen, decide that their marriage should be one of equal partnership, although they agree that, in public, Arveragus should appear to have overall authority to preserve his high status. Arveragus then travels to Britain to seek honour and fame. He leaves Dorigen alone in France near the coastal town of Pedmark (today Penmarc'h) in Armorik (or Brittany as it is now known). She misses her husband terribly while he is gone, and is particularly concerned that his ship will be wrecked on the black rocks of Brittany as he returns home.

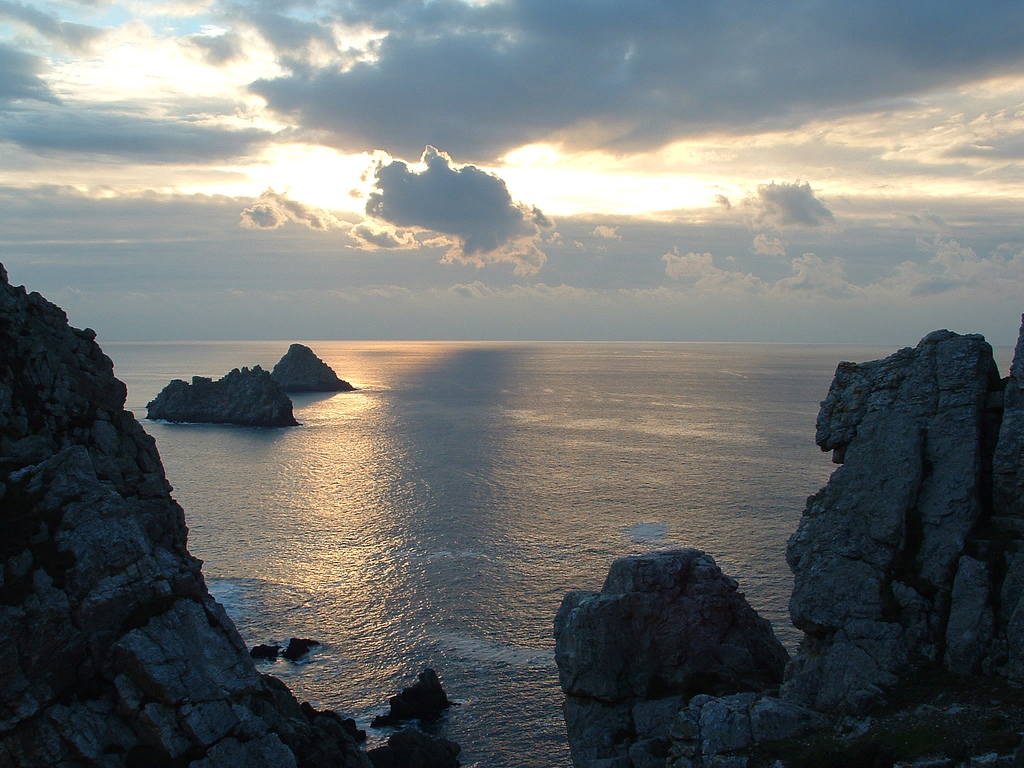
les Tas de Pais off the Pointe de Penhir in Camaret, Brittany

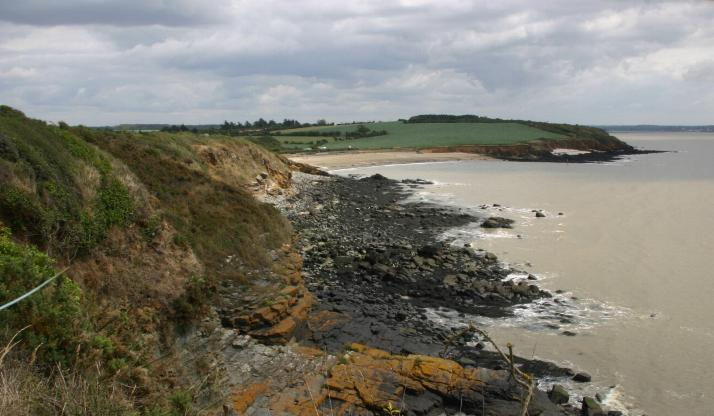
Rocky coast – Brittany

While Arveragus is absent, Dorigen is courted against her will by another suitor, a squire named Aurelius. Finally, to get rid of him and in a lighthearted mood, she makes a rash promise and tells Aurelius that he might have her love providing he can dispose of all the rocks on the coast of Brittany. Aurelius finally manages to secure the services of a magician-scholar of the arcane arts, who, taking pity on the young man, for the princely sum of a thousand pounds agrees "thurgh his magik" to make all the rocks "aweye" "for a wyke or tweye" (possibly by association with an exceptionally high tide).

When the "rokkes" vanish, Aurelius confronts Dorigen and demands that she fulfil her bargain. By this time Arveragus has returned safely. Dorigen lists numerous examples of legendary women who committed suicide to maintain their honour. Dorigen explains her moral predicament to her husband who calmly says that in good conscience she must go and keep her promise to Aurelius.

When Aurelius hears from a distraught Dorigen that Arveragus has told her to fulfil her promise, he feels sympathy and releases Dorigen from her oath. The magician-scholar is also so moved by Aurelius' story that he cancels the enormous debt that Aurelius owes him, telling him that his hospitality was sufficient. The tale concludes with a demande d'amour, asking 'which was the mooste fre?' (1622) - who acted most nobly, or generously?

== Background to the tale ==
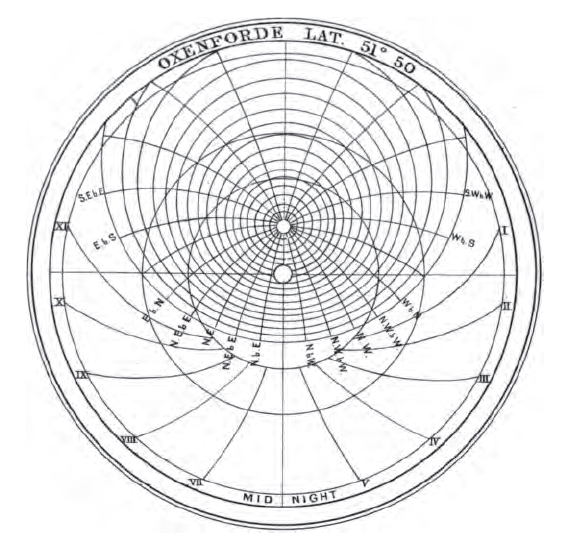
Geoffrey Chaucer. Treatise on the Astrolabe addressed to his son Lowys AD 1391

While the Franklin claims in his prologue that his story is in the form of a Breton lai, it is actually based on two closely related tales by the Italian poet and author Boccaccio. These appear in Book 4 of Il Filocolo, 1336, and as the 5th tale on the 10th day of the Decameron. In both stories, a young knight is in love with a lady married to another knight. He persuades her to promise to satisfy his desire if he can create a flowering Maytime garden in winter, which he achieves with the help of a magician, but releases her from her rash promise when he learns that her husband has nobly approved her keeping it. In Chaucer's telling, the setting and style are radically altered. The relationship between the knight and his wife is explored, continuing the theme of marriage which runs through many of the pilgrims' tales. Although the Tale has a Breton setting, it differs from traditional 'Breton lais'. Whereas these mostly involved the fairy supernatural, here magic is presented as a learned business performed by clerks with university training.

This is fitting for a writer like Chaucer who wrote a book (for his son Lewis) on the use of the astrolabe, was reported by Holinshed to be "a man so exquisitely learned in al sciences, that hys matche was not lightly founde anye where in those dayes" and was even considered one of the "secret masters" of alchemy.

While the idea of the magical disappearance of rocks has a variety of potential sources, there is no direct source for the rest of the story. The rocks possibly come from the legends of Merlin performing a similar feat, or might stem from an actual event that happened around the time of Chaucer's birth. In a recent paper, Olson et al. analyzed the Franklin's Tale in terms of medieval astronomy. He noted that on 19 December 1340 the sun and moon were each at their closest possible distance to earth while simultaneously the sun, moon and earth were in a linear alignment; a rare configuration which causes massive high tides. This configuration could be predicted using the astronomical tables and the types of calculations cited in the tale. The theme of the story, though, is less obscure—that of the "rash promise", in which an oath is made that the person does not envisage having to fulfil. The earliest examples of the "rash promise" motif are found in the Sanskrit stories of the Vetala as well as Bojardo's Orlando Innamorto and Don Juan Manuel's Tales of Count Lucanor. There are also rash promises in the Breton lays 'Sir Orfeo' and 'Sir Launfal', which Chaucer may have known.

== Commentary ==
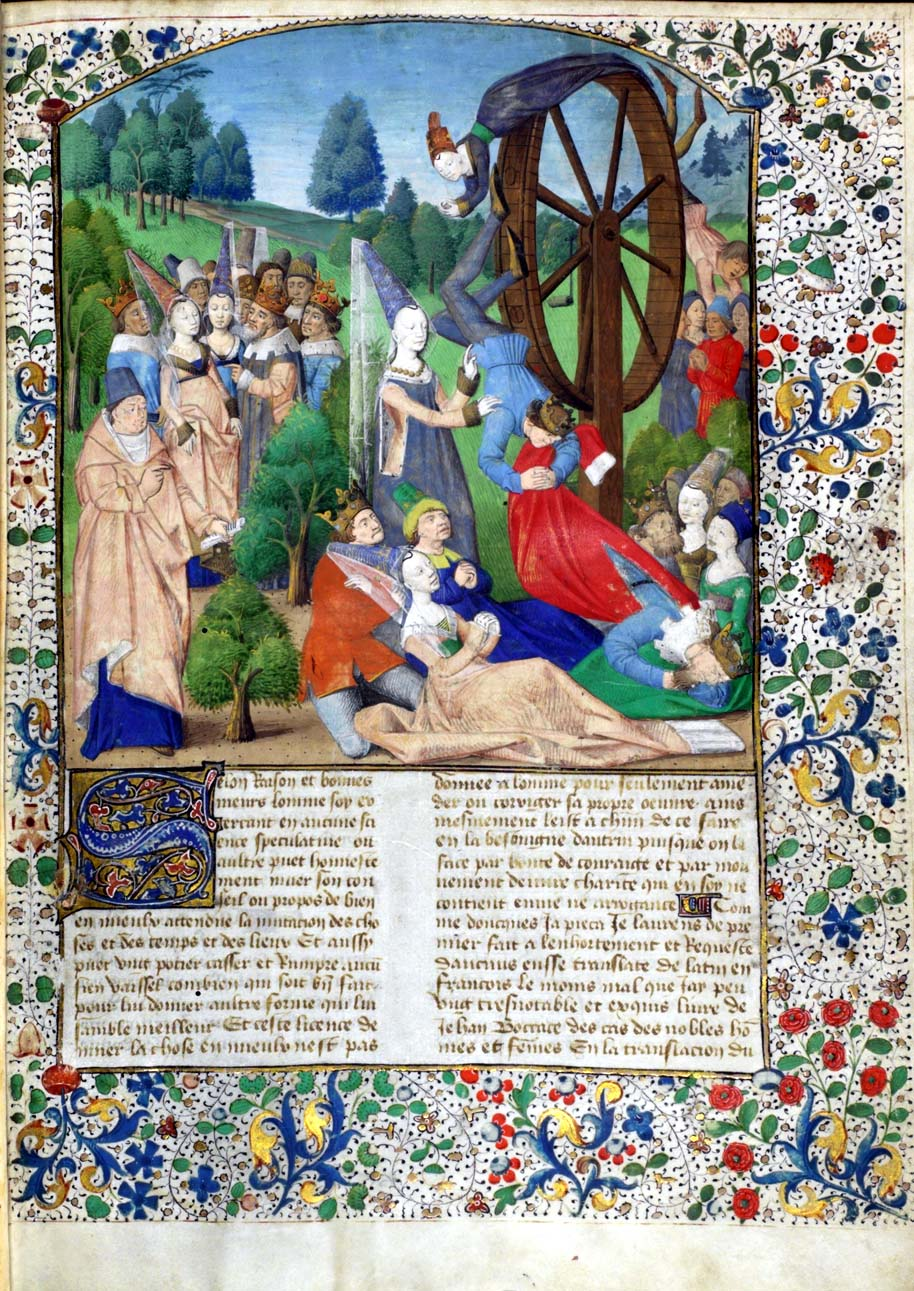
French miniaturist (15th century) Fortune and Her Wheel. Illustration from Boccaccio's De Casibus Virorum Illustrium 1467

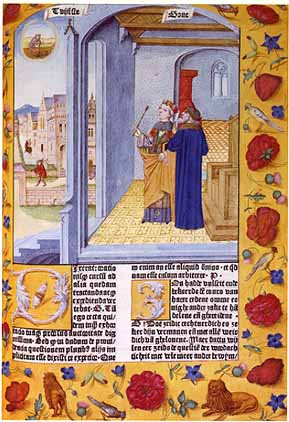
Boethius. Consolation of Philosophy, 1485

Gerald Morgan argues that the Franklin's Tale is organised around moral and philosophical ideas about the reality of Providence and hence of man's moral freedom, as well as the need for generosity in all human contracts. Morgan considers that Aquinas' Summa Theologiae and Boethius' De Consolatione Philosophiae were important influences on Chaucer in writing the Franklin's Tale. Hodgson likewise emphasises how in phraseology reminiscent of Boethius's De Consolatione Philosophiae, Dorigen ponders why a wise and benevolent God could create in "thise grisly feendly rokkes blake" means to destroy and to produce no good "but evere anoyen". D. W. Robertson considers that Arveragus comes across as "not much of a husband"; he exerts himself with many a labour and many a "great emprise" not for the sake of becoming virtuous, but to impress his lady and when he learns of her rash promise he advises her to go ahead and commit adultery, but only to keep quiet about it "up peyne of deeth." This sour view of Arveragus is disputed by Bowden, who refers to Arveragus' honest belief that "trouthe is the hyest thyng that man may kepe" so that he too may be called "a verray parfit gentil knyght". Gardner considers that the Franklin's Tale comes close to Chaucer's own philosophical position that all classes must be ruled by "patience".

On the theme in the Canterbury Tales about freedom and sovereignty in marriage, the Franklin's Tale arguably explores three successive acts of conscience or gentilesse springing from rich human generosity: by Dorigen's husband, her suitor and the magician who cancels the debt owed to him. Howard, however, considers it unlikely that the Franklin's Tale represents Chaucer's view on marriage, the Franklin being "not the sort of character to whom Chaucer would assign a tale meant to settle an issue". Helen Cooper writes that the absolutes considered in the tale are moral qualities (patience, fredom or generosity, gentillesse, trouthe): "Averagus comforts his wife, and then bursts into tears. He and the other men make their choices for good without privileged knowledge and out of free will: a free will that reflects the liberty given to Dorigen within her marriage. A happy ending requires not that God should unmake the rocks, but that a series of individuals should opt to yield up and give, rather than take." Darragh Greene argues that the Franklin's most distinctive characteristic, liberality, is essential to solving the ethical problem explored in his story; it is not law-based morality but the virtue ethics of living in accordance with the value system of gentillesse which secures such happiness as is possible in an imperfect world. Whittock considers that this tale represents, beyond the Franklin's own consciousness of it, a "fearful symmetry" in the universe; where acting from conscience on qualities of truth, generosity and gentillesse must shift from being a secular ethical attitude to one that represents man's grateful (but always imperfect) response to the bounty of a transcendent consciousness. A. C. Spearing writes that one of the important messages of the Franklin's Tale is that our vision of the right way to live, or how to do the right thing in problematic circumstances "does not come to us directly from God or conscience, but is mediated by internalised images of ourselves as judged by other human beings. The very terms we use to assess conduct (right, decent, mean, rotten, and so on) belong to languages we did not invent for ourselves, and their meanings are given by the communities to which we belong."
