= John Milton (composer) =

Father of poet John Milton and English composer

John Milton (1562–1647) was an English composer and father of poet John Milton. His compositions were mostly religious in theme. A financial worker by trade, he also wrote poetry. He lived in London for most of his life.

== Biography ==
Early in his life he converted to Protestantism and his own Roman Catholic father, Richard Milton, subsequently disowned him. He moved to London around 1583 to work as an apprentice scrivener. His work largely pertained to business matters; often working as a moneylender or a financial broker. He registered with the Company of Scriveners on 27 February 1599. Soon after this he started a family, marrying Sara Jeffrey (c. 1572–1637) and living in Bread Street, London, with her parents. Records show the couple had six children, three of whom reached adulthood. The three surviving children were Anne, John Milton (the poet) and Christopher Milton (a judge who was later awarded a knighthood).

Similar to his first son of the same name, Milton wrote poetry. Two poems are known to have existed: a sonnet and a poem dedicated to John Lane—both unpublished. Milton's main creative outlet, however, was composing music. Twenty musical compositions are verified as belonging to Milton. All but one of his compositions contained a religious theme. Milton succeeded in publishing his works in Thomas Morley's The Triumphs of Oriana (1601), William Leighton's The Tears or Lamentations of a Sorrowful Soul (1612) and Thomas Ravenscroft's The Whole Book of Psalms (1621), amongst others. Other works survived as manuscripts under the care of John Browne, a Parliamentary clerk, and Thomas Myriell, a personal friend of the composer. During a visit of Otto, Landgrave of Hesse-Kassel to London in the summer of 1611, Milton composed a song in 80 ('fourscore') parts, for which the landgrave presented him with a gold medal.

Milton's work made the family so prosperous that they could afford to employ private tutors of classical languages for their sons and later send them to school and university. This affluence also meant that his eldest son, John Milton, never had to work and thus spent his time focusing on writing. Milton also ensured that his eldest son was thoroughly educated in music.

In 1631 Milton and his family moved from Bread Street to Hammersmith where he resided until his retirement in 1636. Thereafter he moved with his wife to Horton, Buckinghamshire. However, Sara died shortly after on 3 April 1637 and she was buried in the aisle of the parish church. Milton moved to Reading, Berkshire in 1641 to live with his youngest son but after the Siege of Reading he moved back to London, living with his eldest son, John Milton. After his son reconciled with his wife the family moved to the Barbican. He remained there until his death and was buried on 15 March 1647 in St Giles Cripplegate.
