= John Holmes (composer) =

English cathedral musician and Renaissance composer

John Holmes (died 1629) was an English cathedral musician and Renaissance composer. His madrigal Thus Bonny-boots The Birthday Celebrated was included in The Triumphs of Oriana, a collection of vocal compositions published in 1601.

Over his career, Holmes was employed at both the Winchester and Salisbury Cathedrals. Holmes was appointed Master of the Choristers at Salisbury in 1621 and held that position until his death.
