= Richard Carlton =

English composer (c1558–c1638)

Richard Carlton (c. 1558 – c. 1638) was an English composer and vicar. He is known mainly for his madrigals and was a contemporary of John Wilbye.

== Life and career ==
Born c. 1558, Richard Carlton graduated from Clare College, Cambridge in 1577. He served simultaneously as both the vicar of St Stephen's Church, Norwich and a minor canon of the Norwich Cathedral. At the latter institution he was Master of the Choristers from 1591 to 1605. In October 1612 he was given a living at Bawsey-cum-Glosthorpe in Norfolk where he presided until his death in c. 1638.

In 1601 Carlton's madrigal Calm was the air was published in Thomas Morley The Triumphs of Oriana, and that same year he published a collection of madrigals in London. In this latter work he is described as "Preist: Batchelor in Musique". One of his madrigals, Come, woeful Orpheus, was an elegy to Sir John Shelton. These two 1601 works were his only publications, although original copies of two of his unpublished anthems are in the collection at the Bodleian Library and another unpublished pavane is in the collection of the British Library.
