= John Lugge =

English organist and composer

John Lugge (c.1580 – 1647–55) was an English organist and composer, who spent most of his musical career at Exeter Cathedral.

== Early life and family ==
John Lugge was the son of Joan Downe and Thomas Lugge, a shoemaker. (Note: Lugge's father has often mistakenly been identified as Thomas Lugge, a vicar choral at Exeter Cathedral. See, for example, Grove Music Online.) He was baptized on 24 October 1580 at Barnstaple. His brother Peter was brought up in Lisbon, Portugal. He married Rebecca, with whom he had six children. One of their sons, Robert, studied music at St John's College, Oxford, and himself became a composer. Rebecca died in August 1644, but the year of John Lugge's death is unknown. The last documentary evidence relating to him is from 1647, where he transferred the lease of his house to one of his daughters.

== Music career ==
=== As organist ===
There are no known records concerning Lugge's early musical education, although it is possible that he was a chorister at Exeter Cathedral. Lugge became the organist at Exeter Cathedral in 1603. (Note: There is no record of the date of his appointment, but the first occasion that he signed for his salary was in March 1603.) In 1605, he became lay vicar choral. He continued in both of these positions until 1647. From June 1608, his salary was divided with Edward Gibbons, who presumably shared some of his duties.

=== As composer ===
Lugge composed three organ voluntaries, which musicologist John Steele has described as "the best examples of this peculiarly English genre written before the Civil War". Some of the compositions attributed to his son Robert may actually have been composed by him.

== Religion ==
In 1617, Lugge was examined by a bishop, accused of having Roman Catholic sympathies, an accusation prompted by a letter sent by his brother Peter. He was not convicted of any crime, with the bishop asserting: "Though I fear, and by conference do suspect that he hath eaten a little bit, or mumbled a piece of this forbidden fruit, yet I verily believe he hath spit it all out again". His house was searched in 1624, but nothing was found to support the claim.

== See also ==
- Hugh Facy
