= Ellis Gibbons =

English Renaissance composer (1573–1603)

- Born: Cambridge
- Baptised: 30 November 1573; Holy Trinity Church, Cambridge
- Died: 14? May 1603 (aged 29–30)
- Occupation: Composer
- Known for: Two madrigals in The Triumphs of Oriana
- Relatives: Orlando Gibbons (Brother); Edward Gibbons (Brother); Christopher Gibbons (Nephew)
- Movement: English Madrigal School

Ellis Gibbons (bapt. 30 November 1573 – 14? May 1603) was an English composer of the late Renaissance music who was associated with the English Madrigal School. Born in Cambridge to a musical family, Gibbons was the second surviving son of William Gibbons, a town wait. By 1598 he was known to be living in Cambridge's High ward, and later the Market ward. He owned property in Cambridge and London and probably spent much time there, presumably as a musician of some kind (although this has never been verified). At the age of 28 he became one of only two composers to contribute two pieces to The Triumphs of Oriana, a collection of 25 madrigals published in 1601. These madrigals were Long live faire Oriana and Round about her Charret; modern commentators generally favor the latter. No other compositions by Gibbons survive, and some scholars have doubted his authorship of these works, ascribing them to his brothers. Two months after his mother's death, his career was cut short by his early death in May 1603, leaving behind his brothers Edward, Ferdinando and Orlando, who would become the most famous musician of the family. Orlando's son, Christopher, was also a noted composer.

== Life and career ==
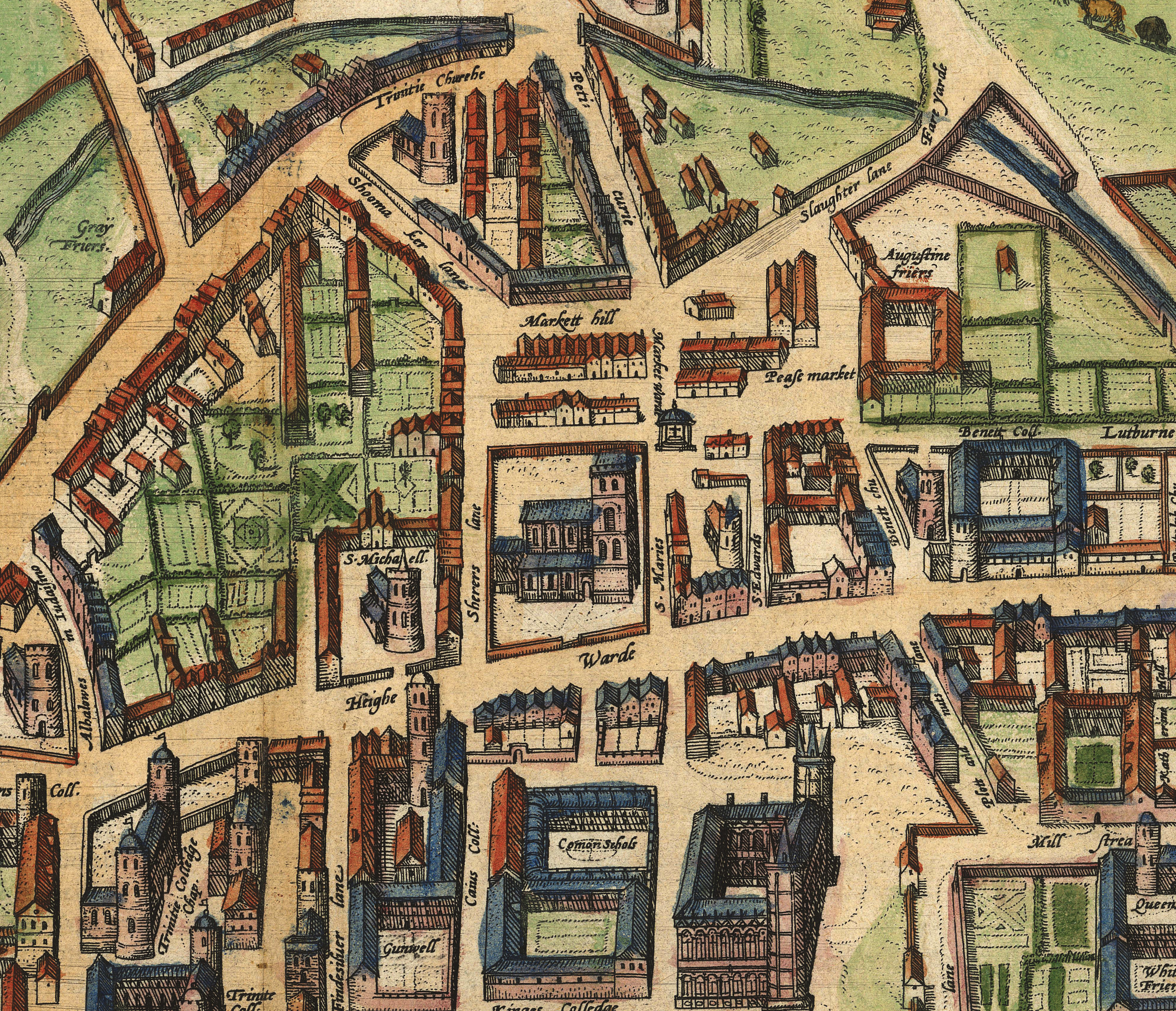
16th-century Cambridge (Braun and Hogenberg)

Ellis Gibbons was born to William (c. 1540 – 1595) and Mary (d. 1603) Gibbons in Cambridge and baptised on 30 November 1573 at Holy Trinity Church, Cambridge. (Note: The maiden name of Ellis's mother is unknown.) At the time early baptisms were commonplace, so his actual date of birth was likely shortly before 30 November. He was born as the second surviving son in a musical family, (Note: The first son, Richard, died as an infant.) where his father William had recently become head of the Cambridge waits, and his older brother Edward would also go into a musical career. 1581/82 saw the birth of Ferdinando in Cambridge, who eventually took William's place as wait. Orlando, who would become the most famous musician of the family, was born in 1583 in Oxford, although musicologist George A. Thewlis notes that Edward and Ellis were still living in Cambridge at the time.

Cambridge subsidy roles from 1598–1600 listed Gibbons as first living in the High ward, (Note: The High ward consists of modern day Trinity Street.) and later the Market ward. (Note: The Market ward consists of modern day parishes of St Mary, St Edward's and St Bene't's) Gibbons owned property in Cambridge and in the churchyard of St Paul's Cathedral, suggesting that he spent time in London. He was not the organist of Salisbury Cathedral and the Bristol Cathedral as 17th-century biographer, Anthony Wood and other early biographies claim. (Note: Although most of these biographies probably based this claim on Wood's initial account.) Modern musicologists do not accept this claim since Wood had conflicting statements earlier in his text and no supporting evidence has been found in the Salisbury or Bristol records. Additionally, records specify that Richard Fuller was the Salisbury Cathedral organist from 1592–1598, John Farrant from 1598–1602 and John Holmes (d. 1629) from 1602–1610. Any official employment Gibbons did have is unrecorded, and while it was likely music related, there is no evidence for this.

At the age of 28 he became the only composer, other than the editor Thomas Morley himself, to contribute two madrigals to The Triumphs of Oriana, a collection of 25 madrigals by 23 composers (most a part of the informal English Madrigal School), published in 1601. He is known to have married Joan Dyer, likely the sister of the James Dyer who married Gibbons' sister Elizabeth in 1600, by at least November 1602; the couple did not have children. In April 1603, Gibbons' mother died and left him as executor and residuary legatee of her will. Soon after Gibbons himself would write his own will on 14 May 1603, from which much of what is known about Gibbons comes from. Since the will was proved only 4 days later by his brother Edward, musicologist Edmund Fellowes speculated that the 14 May 1603 was also Gibbons' date of death. He was probably buried in the parish of St Benet Paul's Wharf, London and while his cause of death is unknown, he may have succumbed to the plague which killed nearly a quarter of London's population that year. His will gave his properties as life estates to his wife Joan, with the remainder to his brother Edward; he gave a legacy of £20 to the child of his sister Elizabeth. (Note: See Harley 1999, p. 275 or Fellowes 1970, pp. 108–109 for Ellis's will)

== Music ==
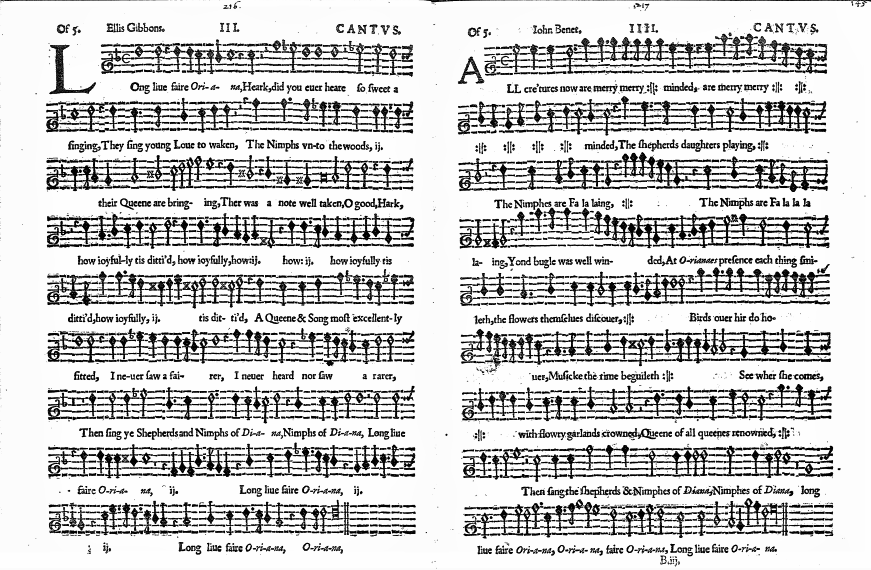
Ellis Gibbons - Long live faire Oriana (1601), cantus part

Other than two madrigals for The Triumphs of Oriana, no works by Gibbons survive. He was the only composer to contribute two madrigals to The Triumphs of Oriana other than the editor, Morley. American musicologist Joseph Kerman furthers this oddity by noting that prominent English composers like William Byrd and Giles Farnaby are excluded, which he explains by speculating that one of the madrigals may be by Ellis Gibbons' older brother Edward. Kerman even goes so far as to describe Ellis Gibbons as a "non-entity". Based on stylistic evidence, Fellowes suggests that both madrigals are by the then 19 year old Orlando, but notes there is no valid evidence to support this claim. (Note: Fellowes previously noted that the inclusion of two madrigals by Ellis Gibbons was to honor his early death in 1603, but this is not possible since The Triumphs of Oriana was compiled and originally published with both madrigals in 1601, two years before his death.)

The pieces Ellis Gibbons contributed to The Triumphs of Oriana were the 5 part madrigal Long live fair Orianae and a six part madrigal entitled Round about her Charret. The latter is considered by Fellowes and musicologist John Harley to be more sophisticated, although Harley notes that it is still demonstrated "at best an unpracticed composer". Long live faire Oriana has been criticized by Fellowes and Harley as being dull, and having "the appearance of being written at the keyboard".

== Works ==
External audio
- Long live fair Oriana performed by The King's Singers
- Long live fair Oriana

List of compositions by Ellis Gibbons
Title	Voices	Genre	Collection: No.
Long live fair Oriana	5	Madrigal	The Triumphs of Oriana: 3
Round about her Charre	6	Madrigal	The Triumphs of Oriana: 19
No other works by Ellis Gibbons survive
