= Il Trionfo di Dori =

Il Trionfo Di Dori (The Triumph of Dori) is a collection of 29 Italian madrigals published by Angelo Gardano in Venice in 1592. An edition and commentary was published by Edward Harrison Powley in 1974. In England the collection was imitated in The Triumphs of Oriana. In German the collection was edited as Musicalische Streitkrantzelein.

== Contents ==
No.	Title	Poet	Composer
1	Un giorno a Pale sacro	Mauritio Moro	Ippolito Baccusi
2	Dove sorge piacevole	Francesco Bozza Cavalier	Ippolito Sabino
3	Hor ch’ogni vento tace	Giovanni Battista Zuccarini	Orazio Vecchi
4	Se cantano gl’augelli	Orazio Guargante	Giovanni Gabrieli
5	Ninfe a danzar venite	Vitaliano Giscaferio	Alfonso Preti
6	Leggiadre ninfe e pastorelli amanti	Lorenzo Guicciardi	Luca Marenzio
7	Vaghe ninfe selvagge	Erasmo di Valvasone	Giovanni de Macque
8	All’apparir di Dori anzi del sole	Giorgio Muscorno	Oratio Colombani
9	Giunta qui Dori e patorelli amanti	Giacomo Semprevivo	Giovanni Cavaccio
10	Nel tempo che ritorna	Leandro San Vido	Annibale Stabile
11	All’ombra d’un bel faggio	Bartolomeo Roncaglia	Paolo Bozzi
12	Su le fiorite sponde	Francesco Lazaroni	Tiburtio Massaino
13	In una verde piaggia	Andrea Litegato	Giammateo Asola
14	Smeraldi eran le rive il fium’argento	Lodovico Galeazzi	Giulio Eremita
15	Lungo le chiare linfe	Sebastiano Pizzacomino	Philippe de Monte
16	Ove tra l’herbe e i fiori	Giacomo Belloni	Giovanni Croce
17	Quando lieta vezzosa	Francesco Corazzini	Pietro Andrea Bonini
18	Eran Ninfe e Pastori	Mutio Manfredi	Alessandro Striggio
19	Piu trasparente velo	Giulio Benalio	Giovanni Florio
20	Di pastorali accenti	Maddalena Campiglia	Leone Leoni
21	Sotto l’ombroso speco	Martiale di Catanzaro	Felice Anerio
22	L’inargentato lido	Cesare Acelli	Gasparo Zerto
23	Quand’apparisti o vag’o amata Dori	Giovanni Domenico Alessandri	Ruggiero Giovanelli
24	Mentr’a quest’ombr’intorno	Claudio Forzate	Gasparo Costa
25	Dori a quest’ombre e l’aura	Camillo Camilli (poet)	Lelio Bertani
26	Mentre pastori e ninfe	Martino Palma	Lodovico Balbi
27	Al mormorar dei liquidi cristalli	Pietro Malombra	Giovanni Giacomo Gastoldi
28	Da lo spuntar de matutini albori	Pietro Cresci	Costanzo Porta
29	Quando dal terzo cielo	Cortese Cortesi	Giovanni Pierluigi da Palestrina

== Recordings ==
- Il Trionfo Di Dori - Gruppo Vocale Arsi & Tesi, dir Tony Corradini, Tactus: TC 590003 2014
- Il Trionfo Di Dori - The King's Singers, Signum Classics: SIGCD414 2015
