= Christopher Gibbons =

English Baroque composer

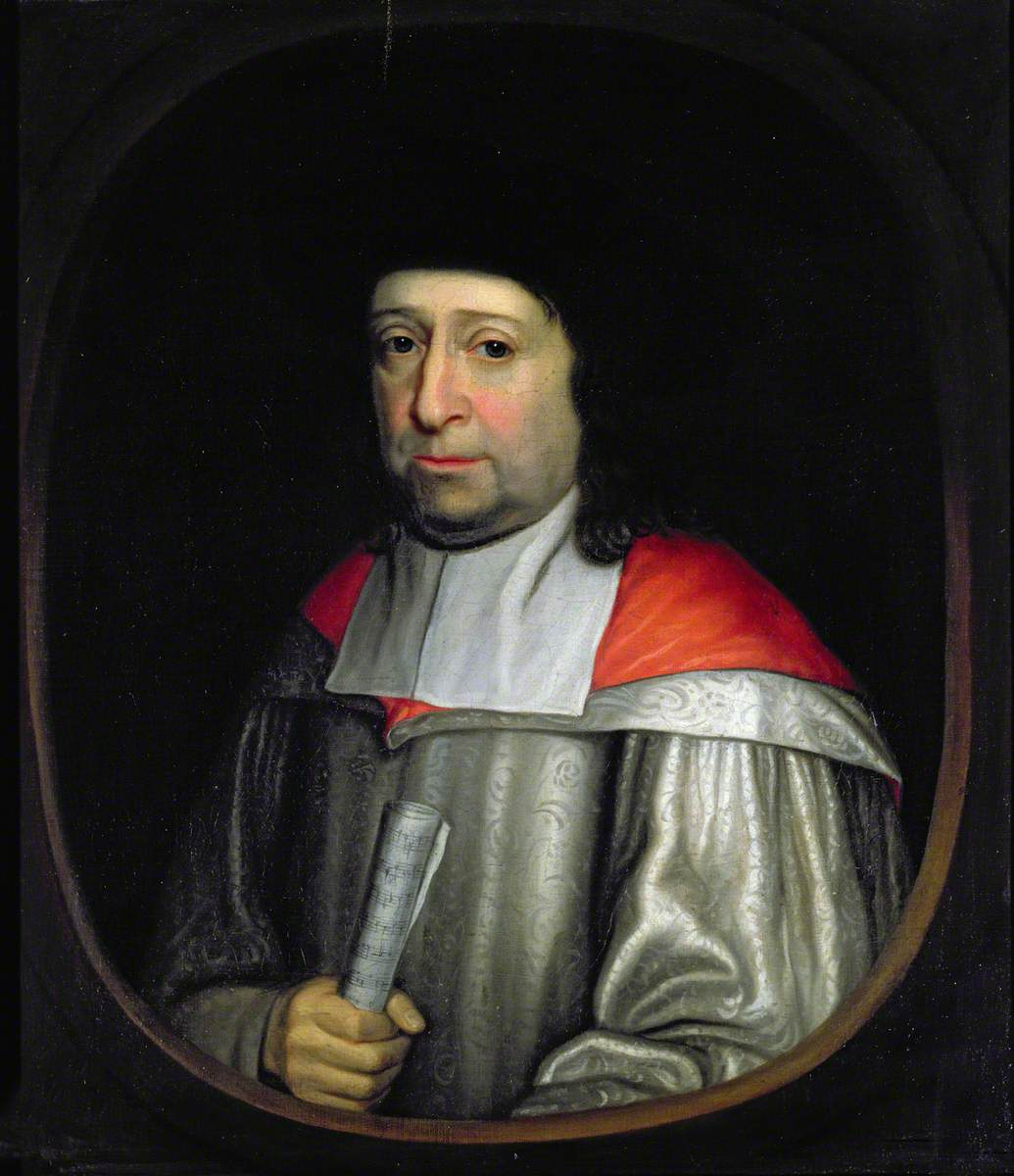
Portrait by an unknown artist.

Christopher Gibbons (bapt. 22 August 1615 – 20 October 1676) was an English composer and organist of the Baroque period. He was the second son, and first surviving child of the composer Orlando Gibbons.

== Life and career ==
=== Background ===
Christopher Gibbons was born into an already very musical family, established by his grandfather, William, who was head of the town waits in Oxford and Cambridge. Christopher Gibbons' uncles Edward, Ellis and Ferdinand furthered their family's reputation as successful musicians themselves, with Ellis and Edward becoming composers and the latter receiving a Bachelor of Music from Cambridge and serving as the master of the Choir of King's College, Cambridge. The family's legacy was cemented by Christopher's father, Orlando, who became by far the most famous and successful composer and musician of the family.

=== Early life ===
Christopher Gibbons was born to Orlando and Elizabeth (née Patten) in Westminster where he was baptized on 22 August 1615 at St Margaret's. While his exact day of birth is unknown, although it was likely only a few days before his baptism as early baptisms were common practice. He was probably named after Orlando's friend and patron Sir Christopher Hatton, although it may have been after Elizabeth's brother, Christopher Edmondes. Gibbons was the 2nd son, but eldest surviving, (Note: One of the children, James, died as an infant in 1607.) of Orlando and Elizabeth. Most information on the first 10 years of Gibbons' life is speculative. A 1663 letter from King Charles II suggests that Gibbons sang in the Chapel Royal under the direction of Nathaniel Giles. (Note: The letter by King Charles II states that "Christopher Gibbons, one of ye oranists of our Chapal Royal hath from his youth, served our royal father and our self".) Gibbons likely studied music with his father and like encouraged to follow musical tradition of the family, resulting in him being Orlando Gibbons' only child to have a musical career. 4 months after Charles I ascended to the throne in 1625 Orlando would die on 5 June 1625, leaving Elizabeth, 10 year old Christopher and Orlando's other children to go and live with their uncle Edward in Exeter.

=== Professional career ===
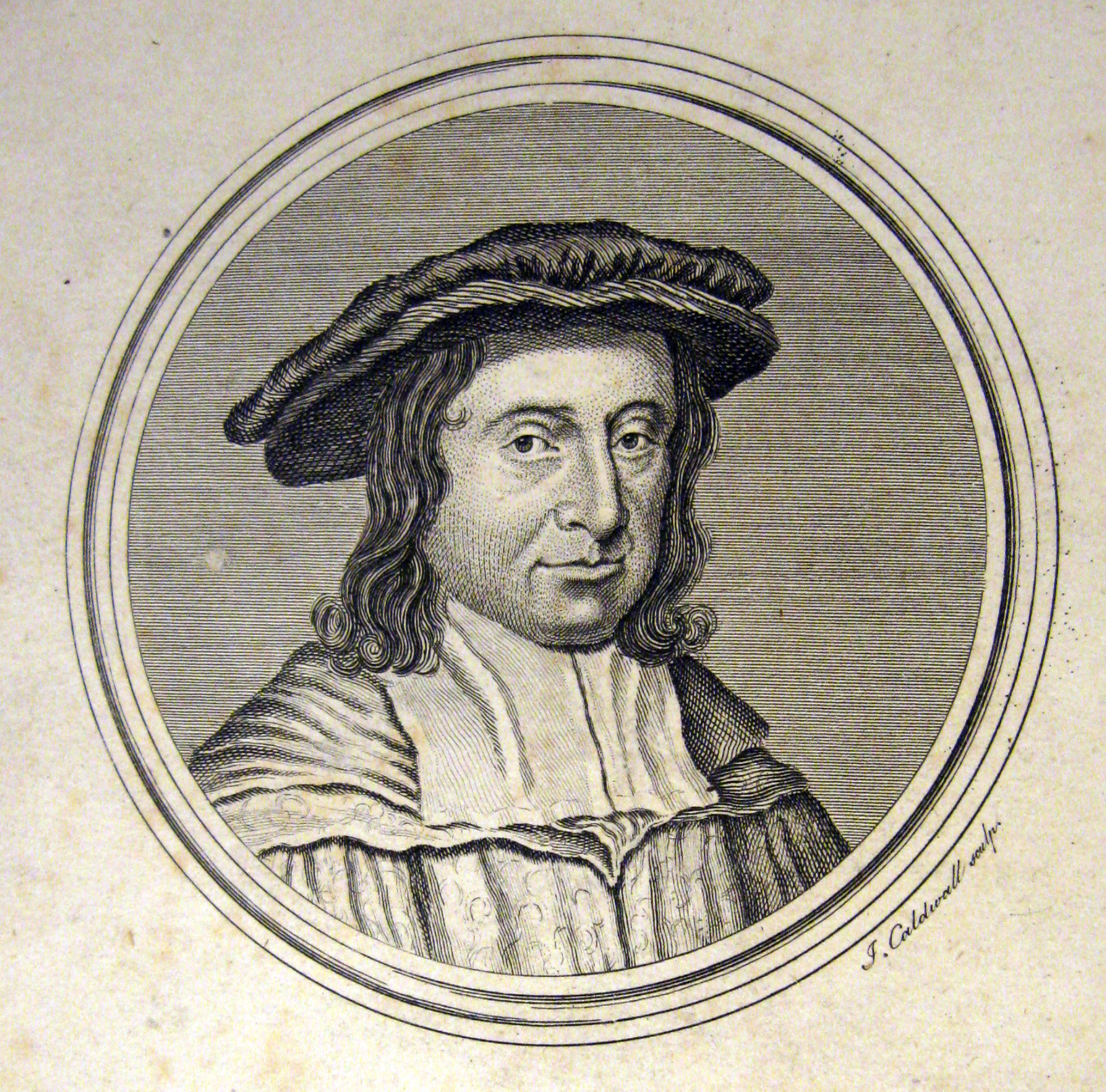
Christopher Gibbons, 1664 (engraving by J. Caldwell from a portrait at Oxford)

In 1638, Gibbons, himself already a noted organist and Gentleman Chorister of the Chapel Royal and Westminster Abbey, succeeded organist Thomas Holmes and began playing in Winchester Cathedral. However, the English Civil War – which began in earnest in 1641 – led to a suppression of Church music, and put an end to Gibbons' position. He fought for the Royalist cause but, after the execution of Charles I and the collapse of Royalist resistance following the Battle of Worcester (1651), Gibbons moved to London where he lived from late in 1651 to his death in 1676. Worthy of mention is his work with respected contemporary Matthew Locke on the masque or quasi-opera Cupid and Death in 1653 – it is one of the few works from this period that still exists in full score. From 1653 until the restoration of the monarchy in 1660, Gibbons made his living primarily as a music teacher and, more occasionally, as a composer of incidental music for the restricted theatres of Commonwealth London.

With the return of Charles II to the English throne, Gibbons, in part because of his loyalty to the crown, was immediately welcomed into the artistic fold of the new court and, with church music again flourishing, was swiftly reinstated as a Gentleman and Organist of the Chapel Royal. He subsequently became one of Charles' most important post-Interregnum composers, teachers and musical advisors. Christopher Gibbons was one of the few Royalist musicians not to flee England for the safety of the continent (such as did Nicholas Lanier) during the Interregnum – and this may explain Gibbons' rapid rise in the king's favour – for it had been no easy thing to remain a known Royalist in Cromwell-controlled London and had cost some their lives.

Gibbons was well-known and influential in the later part of his life (1660–1676) – he is recorded several times in the diaries of Samuel Pepys – and importantly (given his direct link to the musical tradition of the Elizabethan period) he was responsible for the nurturing of several great Restoration composers including Blow, Humfrey and, most significantly, Henry Purcell. He became the first recorded organist of St Martin-in-the-Fields in 1674, where it is likely he composed his three Voluntaries for Double Organ, using the two distinct manuals of the instrument at St Martin's at that time.

His music is little known, and few examples exist, but it is as a teacher and upholder of the English musical tradition – before the almost 30-year interruption to it by those socioeconomic and cultural struggles that culminated in the English Civil War – that secures for him a substantial role in the rebirth of English music, particularly church music, during the second half of the 17th century.

Cultural offices
Preceded by Commonwealth period	Organist of Westminster Abbey; 1660–1666	Succeeded by Albertus Bryne
