= Seldom Sene =

Recorder quintet founded in Amsterdam in 2009

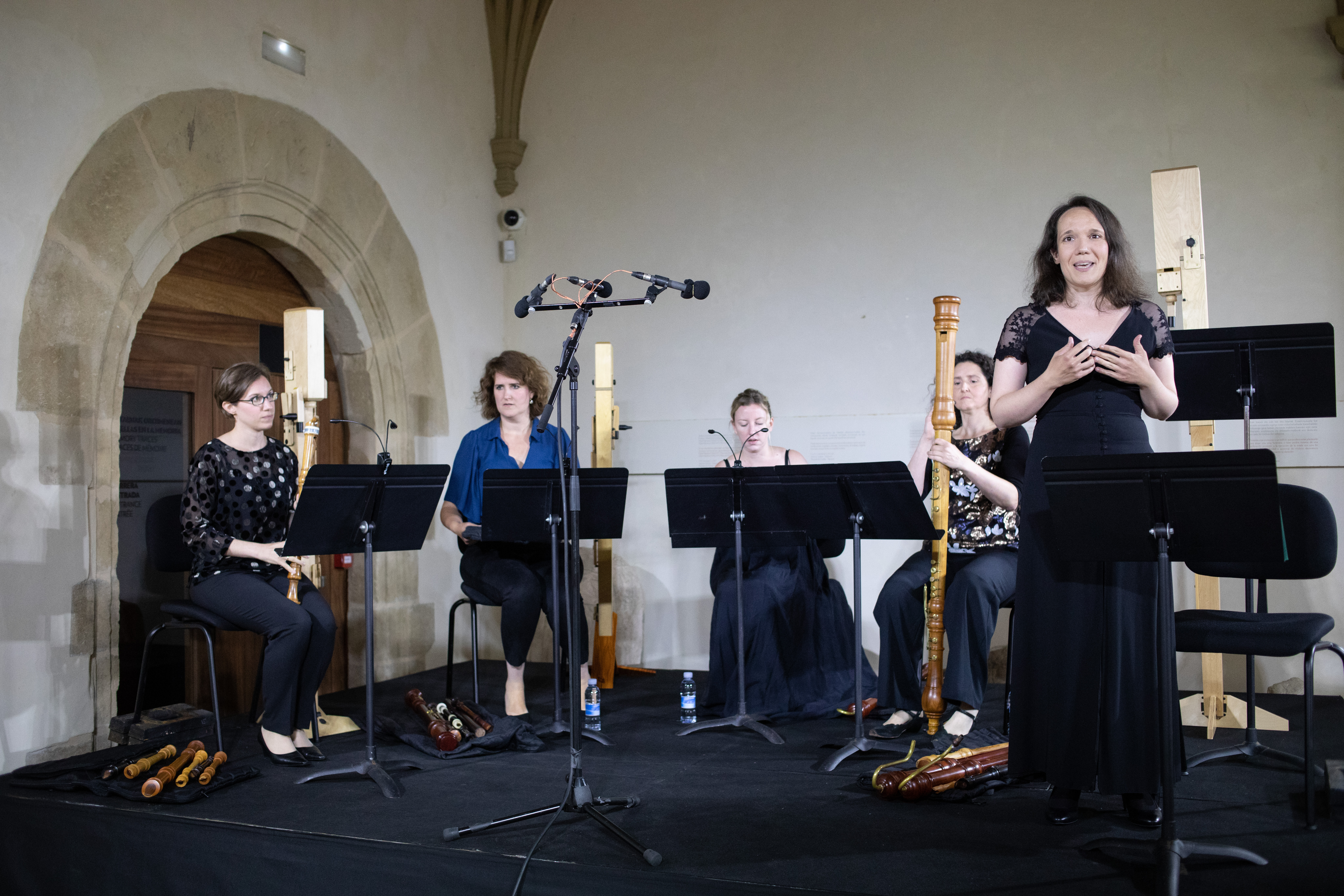
Seldom Sene at the Quincena Musical de San Sebastián, 2021

Seldom Sene is a recorder quintet founded in Amsterdam in 2009. The group consists of five women: Stephanie Brandt, Ruth Dyson, Eva Lio, Hester Groenleer, and Maria Martinez Ayerza.

In September 2014 they were awarded First Prize, the Audience Award and the Press Prize of the International Van Wassenaer Early Music Competition in the Utrecht Early Music Festival.

They have recorded seven albums to date on the Brilliant Classics label. Their first album, Taracea was released in September 2014, and received favorable reviews in Gramophone and The Irish Times. El aire se serena was released in February 2016. Their third album, a recording of the Goldberg Variations by J. S. Bach was released in October 2017. Their fourth album, Delight in Musicke, with vocals by soprano Klaartje van Veldhoven, was released in March 2018. Their fifth album, Not a Single Road, a collection of contemporary music commissioned by the group, was released in September 2019. Their sixth album, Concerto Barocco, a collection of arrangements of Baroque concertos, was released in December 2020. Their seventh album, Fortune Infortune: A Portrait of Margaret of Austria, was released in October 2023.
