= The Triumphs of Oriana =

1601 book by Thomas Morley

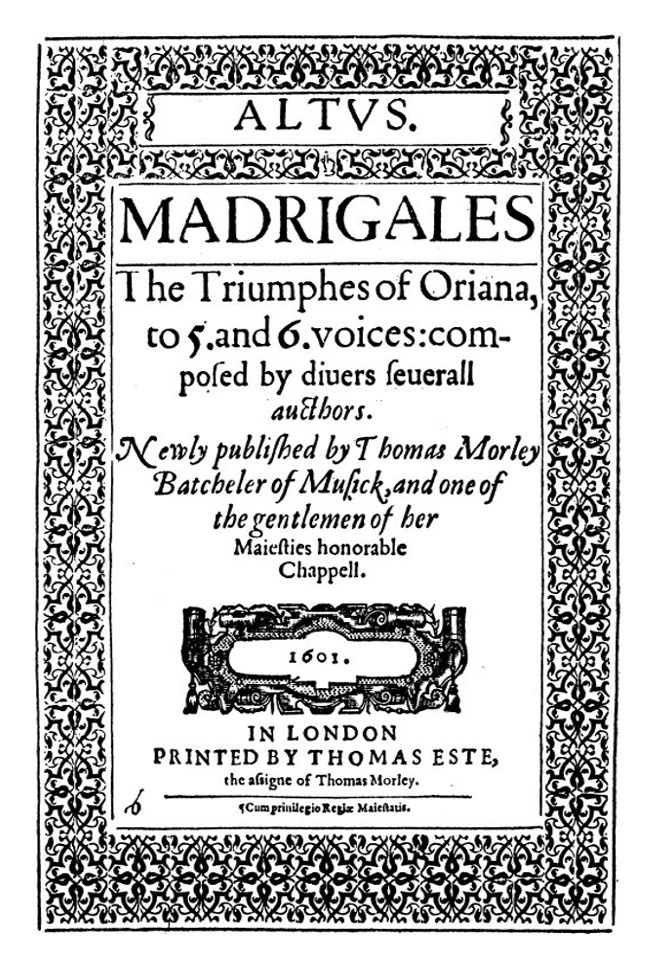
Title page of The Triumphs of Oriana, from the original 1601 publication

The Triumphs of Oriana is a book of English madrigals, compiled and published in 1601 by Thomas Morley, which first edition has 25 pieces by 23 composers (Thomas Morley and Ellis Gibbons have two madrigals) for 5 and 6 voices. The first 14 madrigals are for 5vv, the last 11 for 6vv. It was said to have been made to honour Queen Elizabeth I. Every madrigal in the collection contains the following couplet at the end: “Then sang the shepherds and nymphs of Diana: long live fair Oriana” (the word "Oriana" often being used to refer to Queen Elizabeth) though some of the composers wrote variants of this refrain.

It is based on Il Trionfo di Dori by Italian composer Angelo Gardano.

Recently, the attribution of "Oriana" to Elizabeth has come into question. Evidence has been presented that "Oriana" actually refers to Anne of Denmark, who would become Queen of England alongside James VI of Scotland (later James I of England) in an apparently failed early attempt to remove Elizabeth in order to restore England to Catholicism. In his book 'The English Madrigalists', Edmund Fellowes, the most prolific of madrigal editors of the earlier 20th century, disapproved of the theory.

== Contents ==
order	composer	piece
1	Michael East	Hence Stars
2	Daniel Norcombe	With Angel's Face
3	John Mundy	Lightly she whipped o'er the dales
4	Ellis Gibbons	Long live fair Oriana
5	John Bennet	All Creatures now are Merry‐minded
6	John Hilton	Fair Oriana, beauty's Queen
7	George Marson	The Nymphs and Shepherds danced
8	Richard Carlton	Calm was the Air
9	John Holmes	Thus Bonnyboots
10	Richard Nicholson	Sing shepherds all
11	Thomas Tomkins	The Fauns and Satyrs
12	Michael Cavendish	Come gentle Swains
13	William Cobbold	With Wreaths of Rose and Laurel
14	Thomas Morley	Arise, awake
15	John Farmer	Fair Nymphs
16	John Wilbye	The Lady Oriana
17	Thomas Hunt	Hark, did ye ever Hear so Sweet a Singing?
18	Thomas Weelkes	As Vesta was from Latmos Hill descending
19	John Milton	Fair Orian
20	Ellis Gibbons	Round about her Chariot
21	George Kirbye	With Angel's Face
22	Robert Jones	Fair Oriana
23	John Lisley	Fair Cytherea
24	Thomas Morley	Hard by a Crystal Fountain
25	Edward Johnson	Come blessed Bird

== Choral Songs in Honour of Her Majesty Queen Victoria (1899) ==
In 1899, at the instigation of Sir Walter Parratt, Master of the Queen's Music, 13 British composers contributed songs to a collection modeled on The Triumphs of Oriana, entitled Choral Songs in Honour of Her Majesty Queen Victoria, published on the occasion of Victoria's 80th birthday.

== A Garland for the Queen (1953) ==
A Garland for the Queen, a compilation along similar lines, containing pieces by ten composers, was published to mark the coronation of Queen Elizabeth II.

== Recordings ==
- The Triumphs of Oriana: Madrigals Pro Cantione Antiqua, Ian Partridge Archiv
- I Fagiolini
- The King's Singers

== See also ==
- The Triumphs of Oriana: Free scores at the Choral Public Domain Library (ChoralWiki)
- The Oxford Book of English Madrigals which reproduces several of the pieces from Morley's collection.
- List of Renaissance composers

== Sources ==
Books

- Fellowes, Edmund H. (1951). Orlando Gibbons and His Family: The Last of the Tudor School of Musicians (2nd ed.). United States: Archon Books. ISBN 978-0-208-00848-0.
- Harley, John (1999). Orlando Gibbons and the Gibbons Family of Musicians. London, England: Ashgate Publishing. ISBN 978-1-840-14209-9.
- Kerman, Joseph (1962). The Elizabethan Madrigal: A Comparative Study. New York, New York: American Musicological Society. ISBN 978-1878528063.

Journals and articles

- Brown, David (2015). "The Triumphes of Oriana, contributors to". Oxford Dictionary of National Biography. Oxford, England: Oxford University Press. doi:10.1093/ref:odnb/93694. ISBN 978-0-19-861412-8. (subscription, Wikipedia Library access or UK public library membership required)
- Harley, John (2008) [2004]. "Gibbons, Edward (bap. 1568, d. in or before 1650), musician". Oxford Dictionary of National Biography. Oxford, England: Oxford University Press. doi:10.1093/ref:odnb/10594. ISBN 978-0-19-861412-8. (subscription, Wikipedia Library access or UK public library membership required)
- "Triumphs of Oriana". Oxford Reference. Oxford, England: Oxford University Press. (subscription, Wikipedia Library access or UK public library membership required)
