= William Cobbold (composer) =

English composer (1560–1639)

William Cobbold (1560–1639) was an English composer. He was a lay clerk and organist at the Chapel Royal. One of his best-known works today is the consort song "New Fashions".

== Selected works ==
- "For Death of Her" - an elegy composed upon the 1588 death of Mrs. Mary Gascoigne.
- "New Fashions" - recorded by Theatre of Voices & Fretwork, Paul Hillier
- "With wreaths of rose and laurel" - Cobbold's contribution to The Triumphs of Oriana collection of 25 madrigals from 23 different composers published in 1601 by Thomas Morley.
- "Ye mortal wights"
