= Hugh Facy =

English composer

Hugh Facy (fl. 1618; surname also Facey, Facie, Facye or Facio), was an English composer from the Renaissance. He composed largely choral or keyboard pieces.

== Life ==
Facy acted as an assistant to John Lugge, the organist at Exeter Cathedral and a secondary chorister. He possibly traveled abroad after his term at Exeter.

== Music and influence ==
It is likely that Facy was a Roman Catholic in Italy, although it is not known whether he converted after he left England or was already Catholic when he left the country. The openly religious themes of his work, such as veneration of the Virgin Mary, make it probable that he composed much of his work abroad, as open Marian veneration was not tolerated in England at the time of his composing.

== Works ==
- Ave Maris Stella - A keyboard piece. The only extant piece of the cantus firmus genre.
- Magnificat - Written in Latin instead of Facy's native tongue, English.
