= The Squire (Canterbury Tales) =

Character in the Canterbury Tales

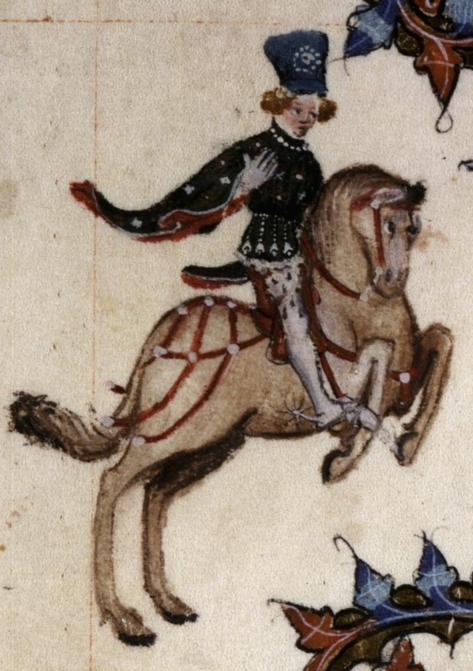
The Squire

The Squire is a fictional character in the framing narrative of Geoffrey Chaucer's Canterbury Tales. He is squire to (and son of) the Knight and is the narrator of The Squire's Tale or Cambuscan. The Squire is one of the secular pilgrims, of the military group (The Squire, The Knight and The Yeoman). The Knight and the Squire are the pilgrims with the highest social status. However his tale, interrupted as it is, is paired with that of the Franklin. The Squire (along with The Shipman and The Summoner) is a candidate for the interrupter of The Host in the epilogue of the Man of Law's Tale.

The Squire is the second pilgrim described in the General Prologue. His tale is told eleventh, after the Merchant and before the Franklin – the first of group F, and considered by modern scholars one of the marriage tales.

== Description ==
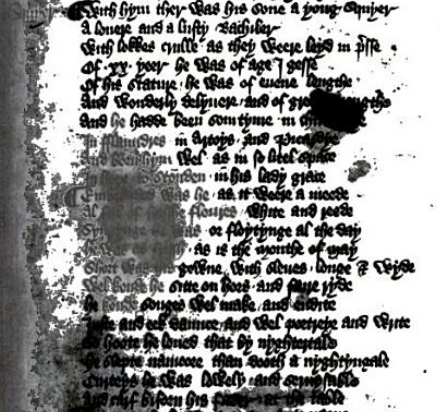
The prologue's description of the Squire, from the Hengwrt Manuscript

The Squire is described in the General Prologue lines 79- 100:

With hym ther was his sone, a yong SQUIER,
A lovyere and a lusty bacheler;
With lokkes crulle, as they were leyd in presse.
Of twenty yeer of age he was, I gesse.
Of his stature he was of evene lengthe,
And wonderly delyvere, and of greet strengthe.
And he hadde been somtyme in chyvachie
In Flaundres, in Artoys, and Pycardie,
And born hym weel, as of so litel space,
In hope to stonden in his lady grace.
Embrouded was he, as it were a meede,
Al ful of fresshe floures, whyte and reede;
Syngynge he was, or floytynge, al the day,
He was as fressh as is the monthe of May.
Short was his gowne, with sleves longe and wyde.
Wel koude he sitte on hors, and faire ryde.
He koude songes make, and wel endite,
Juste, and eek daunce, and weel purtreye and write.
So hoote he lovede, that by nyghtertale
He slepte namoore than dooth a nyghtyngale.
Curteis he was, lowely, and servysable,
And carf biforn his fader at the table.

== Status ==
The squire is the normally the knight's servant. He travels everywhere with the knight and does what is asked of him. Nonetheless, he is also the Knight's son and represents, with the knight, the noble class, and the warrior class. Chaucer was familiar with both, having fought in the Hundred Years' War, and been active as a courtier and diplomat, and indeed having served as a squire.

== As a warrior ==
For a young man "as fresh as the month of May," the squire has quite extensive military experience. He has been on chevauchée with his father in Flanders, Artois and Picardy; a chevauchée was a fast, aggressive raiding campaign undertaken by mounted soldiers which could last anywhere from a month to two years. Chaucer notes that the squire has done good service for one so young ("born hym weel, as of so litel space"), in hope to "stonden in his lady grace" (win his lady's favour).

== Clothing ==
In regards to being fashionable, the Squire is not only dressed in the finest clothes but also mounted on his horse rather well. "He was embroidered like a meadow bright" which (at the time) was a sign of highest class. In addition, his clothes are described in further detail in that "short was his gown, the sleeves were long and wide," which again was the fashion of the day.

His clothes are in contrast to the Knight's which are stained by his armour.

== Courtly skills ==
Even the Squire's horsemanship was fashionable: "He knew the way to sit a horse and ride." In addition, he had skills fashionable for a courtlie young man at the time: jousting, dancing, singing, writing and drawing.

== As a lover ==
The young Squire is in love with love. Within the first couple of lines the reader is told that he is A lovyere and a lusty bacheler, fighting only to "win his lady's grace." This amorous concept is taken further at the end of the Squire's description: "So hoote he lovede, that by nyghtertale/He slepte namoore than dooth a nightangale." ("Nyghtertale" – the duration of night.)

== The squire as a story teller ==
Donald Roy Howard describes him as "endearing in his earnest but unsuccessful attempt to match his father's accomplishments as a storyteller". The Squire is exceedingly long-winded, taking some four hundred lines to come to the start for his tale proper. Despite his disclaimers he uses many rhetorical flourishes. Presumably the slow pace is the reason the Franklin interrupts him.

The Franklin is doubtless poking gentle fun with his tale of the naive squire Aurelias.

== Imagery ==
The springtime imagery from the beginning of the General Prologue re-emerges in the description of the Squire.

== Feminist theory and queer theory ==
Susan Schibanoff asserts that the Squire's feminization should make him a prime target for patriarchal disapprobation. The apparent inability to perceive the Squire's enslavement to females, and consequent emasculation, she says, is contrary to the model (Hansen's) which opposes courtliness to patriarchy as diametrical opposites.

Further Schibanoff contends that the Squire's feminization is exonerated not because of the lack of homoerotic overtones, but because it is alibied by the Pardoner. Thus Chaucer "appropriates the queer other" of the Pardoner to authorise the Squire's "feminized markers of power."

== Sources and influences ==
The Romance of the Rose is widely considered to be a major source for the Squire, meeting all the requirements the god set out for his lover. Other possible sources include the Roman de Troie of Benoit de Ste. Maure.

Chaucer's memory of his younger self as a page and squire, is a natural source, this identification may be extended by considering the Squire as a personification of Chaucer. He is indeed, the only poet in the group, and his protestations of his own limited poetical powers, mirror and indeed self-parody Chaucer's own.
