= Pepperpot =

Pepperpot or pepper pot may refer to:

== Food ==
- Pepper shaker, used to dispense pepper
- Guyanese pepperpot, an Amerindian stew from Guyana and the Caribbean
- Jamaican pepperpot soup, an Arawakan soup from Jamaica
- Philadelphia pepper pot, a thick stew including beef and pepper

== Arts and entertainment ==
- Pepper-Pot: A Scene in the Philadelphia Market, an 1811 painting by Krimmel
- Mrs. Pepperpot, a fictional character in several children's books
- Mrs. Pepper Pot (TV series), a Japanese anime
- Pepperpots, a series of recurring Monty Python's Flying Circus characters

== Buildings ==
- Pepper Pot, Brighton, a historic building in Brighton, England
- The Pepperpot, a historic building in Godalming, Surrey, England
- Pepperpot (lighthouse), a type of small lighthouse

== Other uses ==
- Pepper Pot Centre, a charity in West London
- Pepper-box or Pepper-pot, a multi-barrel firearm
- Pepper pot, common name of fungus Myriostoma coliforme
- Pepper-potting, a technique in military individual movement techniques

== See also ==
- Pepper Potts, a Marvel Comics character
