= Era of Good Feelings =

1815–1825 period in US political history

- 1815–1825
Jeffersonian era	Jacksonian era
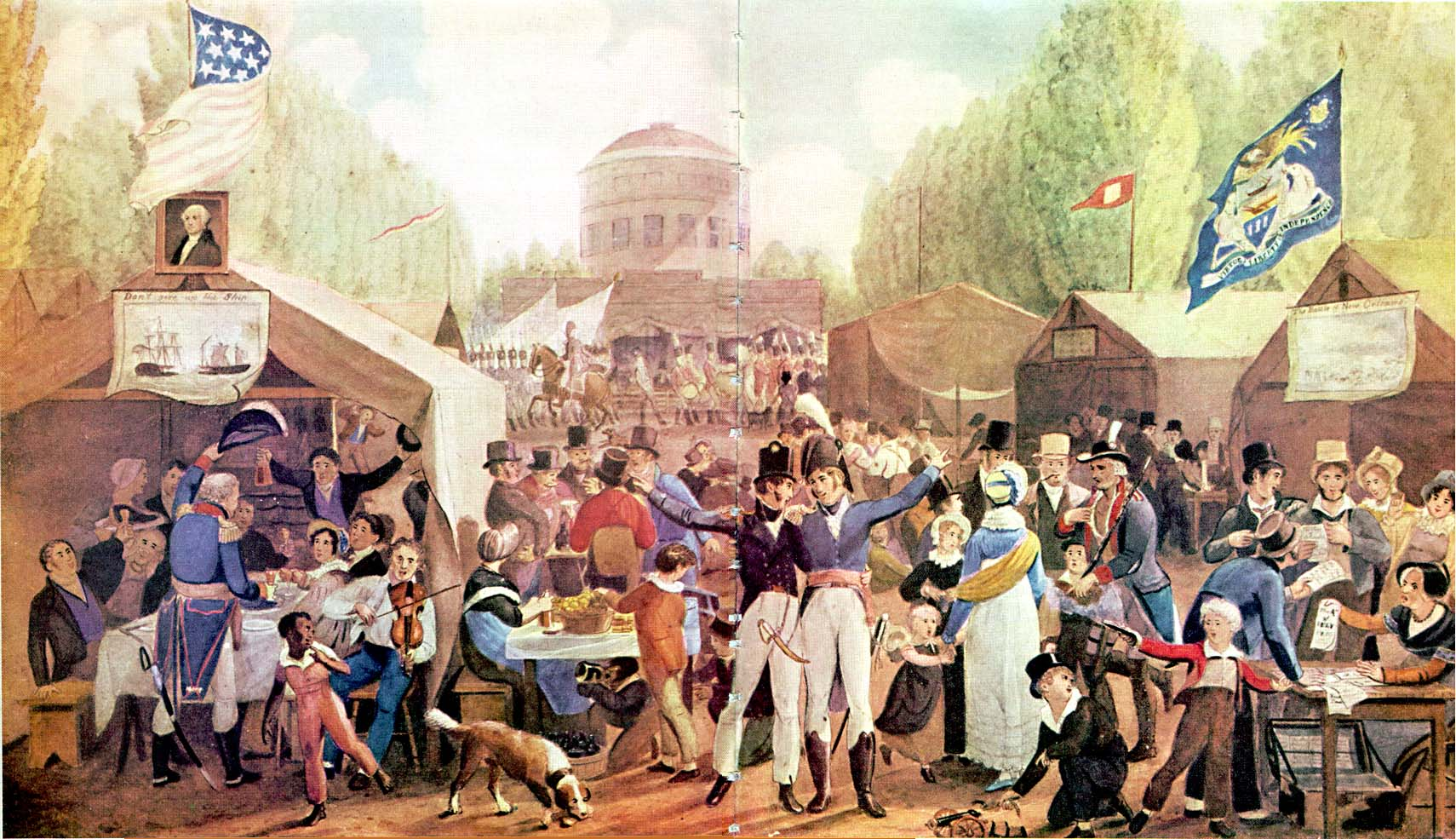
- Independence Day Celebration in Centre Square by John Lewis Krimmel, 1819
- Including: Antebellum South
- President: James Monroe
- Key events: Missouri Compromise; Panic of 1819; Adams-Onis Treaty; Monroe Doctrine

The Era of Good Feelings marked a period in the political history of the United States that reflected a sense of national purpose and a desire for unity among Americans in the aftermath of the War of 1812. The era saw the collapse of the Federalist Party and an end to the bitter partisan disputes between it and the dominant Democratic-Republican Party during the First Party System.

President James Monroe strove to downplay partisan affiliation in making his nominations, with the ultimate goal of national unity and eliminating political parties altogether from national politics. The period is so closely associated with Monroe's presidency (1817–1825) and his administrative goals that his name and the era are virtually synonymous. During and after the 1824 presidential election, the Democratic-Republican Party split between supporters and opponents of Jacksonian Democracy, leading to the Second Party System.

Historians often designate the era as one of good feelings with irony or skepticism, as the political atmosphere was strained and divisive, especially among factions within the Monroe administration and the Democratic-Republican Party. The phrase Era of Good Feelings was coined by Benjamin Russell in the Boston Federalist newspaper Columbian Centinel on July 12, 1817, following Monroe's visit to Boston, Massachusetts, as part of his good-will tour of the United States.

== Post-war nationalism ==
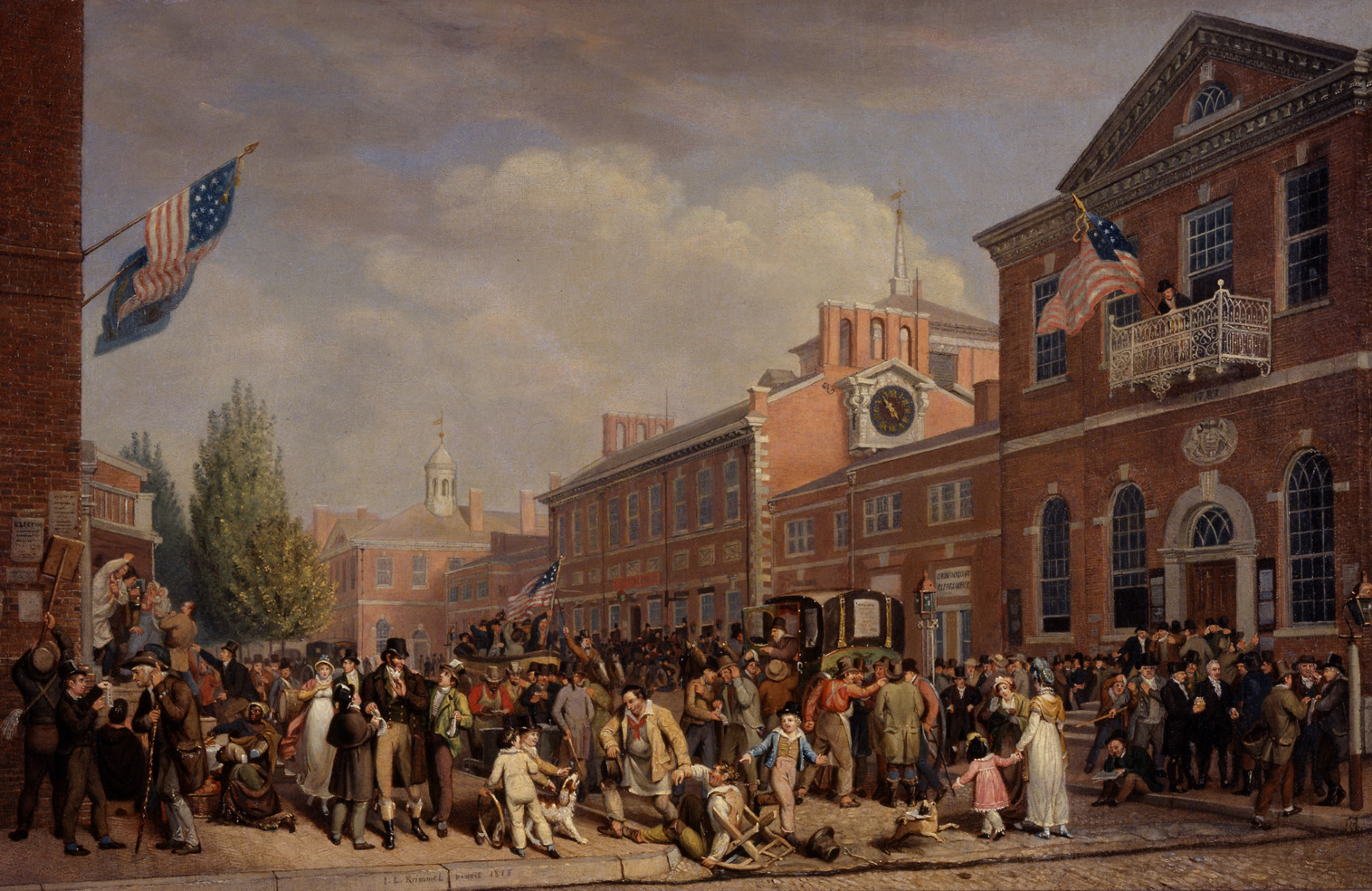
Election Day in Philadelphia by John Lewis Krimmel, 1815

The Era of Good Feelings started in 1815 at the end of the War of 1812. Exultation replaced the bitter political divisions between Federalists and Democratic-Republicans, the North and South, and the East Coast cities and settlers on the American frontier. The political hostilities declined because the Federalist Party had largely dissolved after the fiasco of the Hartford Convention in 1814–15. As a party, Federalists "had collapsed as a national political force". The Democratic-Republican Party was nominally dominant, but in practice it was inactive at the national level and in most states.

The era saw a trend toward national institutions that envisioned "a permanent federal role in the crucial arena of national development and national prosperity". President James Monroe's predecessor James Madison and the Democratic-Republican Party had come to appreciate – through the crucible of war – the expediency of Federalist institutions and projects, and prepared to legislate them under the auspices of John C. Calhoun and Henry Clay's American System.

Madison announced this shift in policy with his State of the Union Address in December 1815, subsequently authorizing measures for a national bank and a protective tariff on manufactures. Vetoing the Bonus Bill on strict constructionist grounds, Madison nevertheless was determined, as had been his predecessor Thomas Jefferson, to see internal improvements implemented with an amendment to the US Constitution. Writing to Monroe in 1817, Madison declares "there has never been a moment when such a proposition to the states was so likely to be approved". The emergence of "new Republicans" – undismayed by mild nationalist policies – anticipated Monroe's "era of good feelings" and a general mood of optimism emerged with hopes for political reconciliation.

Monroe's landslide victory against Federalist Rufus King in the 1816 presidential election was so widely predicted that voter turnout was low. A spirit of reconciliation between Democratic-Republicans and Federalists was well underway when Monroe assumed office in March 1817.

== Monroe and political parties ==
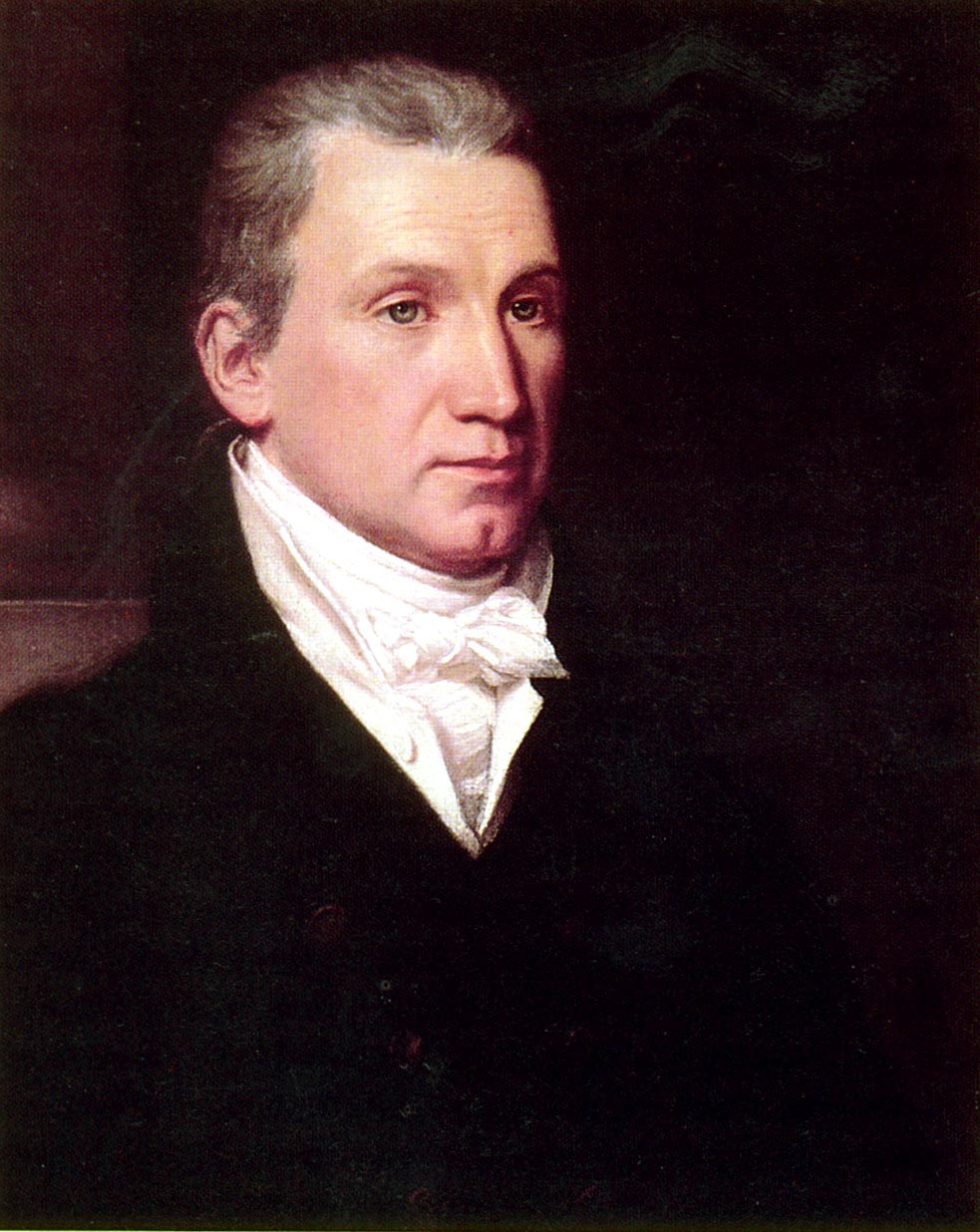
President James Monroe, portrait by John Vanderlyn, 1816

As president, Monroe was widely expected to facilitate a rapprochement of the political parties in order to harmonize the country in a common national outlook, rather than party interests. Both parties exhorted him to include a Federalist in his cabinet to symbolize the new era of "oneness" that pervaded the nation.

Monroe reaffirmed his conviction that the Federalist Party was committed to installing a monarch and overthrowing republican forms of government at the first opportunity. He stated that if he appointed a Federalist, he would prolong their inevitable decline and fall, and that his administration would never allow itself to become tainted with Federalist ideology.

Monroe stated that his drive to eliminate the Federalists was part of his campaign to eliminate party associations altogether from national politics, including his own party. All political parties, he wrote, were incompatible with free government by their very nature. He worked to deflate the Federalist Party through neglect. Federalists were denied political patronage, administrative appointments, and federal support. Monroe indicated that he wished to eradicate Federalists from positions of political power, both federal and state, especially in its New England strongholds. He believed that any expression of official approval would only encourage hope for a Federalist revival, and this he could not abide.

Some historians believe that Monroe reduced party politics, evidenced by his unopposed run in the 1820 presidential election. The Federalists ran no candidate to oppose him, running only a vice-presidential candidate, Richard Stockton. Monroe and his vice president, Daniel D. Tompkins, would have won reelection unanimously through the electoral college, had there not been a handful of faithless electors; one presidential elector cast his vote for John Quincy Adams, while a handful of electors (mostly former Federalists) cast votes for a number of Federalist candidates for vice president. It remains the last presidential election in which a candidate ran essentially unopposed.

== Monroe's goodwill tour ==
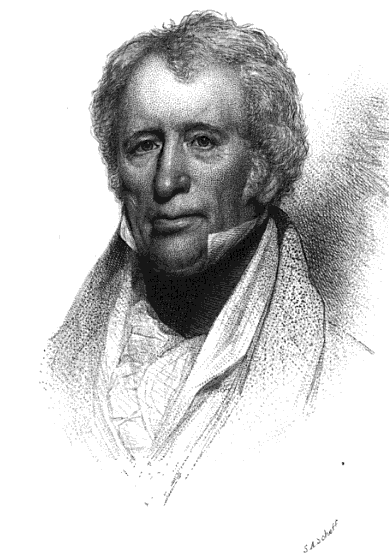
Benjamin Russell is credited with coining the term "Era of Good Feelings" in 1817.

The clearest illustration of the Era of Good Feelings was Monroe's country-wide goodwill tour in 1817 and 1819. His visits to New England and to the Federalist stronghold of Boston in particular were the most significant of the tour. In Boston the descriptive phrase "Era of Good Feelings" was bestowed by a local Federalist journal.

The president's physical appearance, wardrobe and personal attributes were decisive in arousing good feelings on the tour. As the last U.S. president who was a Revolutionary War veteran, he donned a Revolutionary War officer's uniform and tied his long, powdered hair in a queue according to the old-fashioned style of the 18th century. "Tall, rawboned, venerable", he made an "agreeable" impression and had a good deal of charm and "most men immediately liked him ... [in] manner he was rather formal, having an innate sense of dignity, which allowed no one to take liberties. Yet in spite of his formality, he had the ability to put men at their ease by his courtesy, lack of condescension, his frankness, and what his contemporaries looked upon as the essential goodness and kindness of heart which he always radiated."

Monroe's visit to Boston elicited a huge outpouring of nationalist pride and expressions of reconciliation. New England Federalists were especially eager to demonstrate their loyalty after the debacle of the Hartford Convention. Amidst the festivities – banquets, parades, receptions – many took the opportunity to make the most "explicit and solemn declarations" to remove, as Monroe wrote afterwards, "impressions of that kind, which they knew existed, and to get back into the great family of the union". Abigail Adams dubbed the catharsis an "expiation".

In New England, the heart of Federalist territory, Monroe gained the primary goal of his tour; in effect, permitting "the Federalists by solemn public demonstrations to reaffirm their loyalty to the government and their acceptance of Republican control". Even in this atmosphere of contrition, Monroe was assiduous in avoiding any remarks or expressions that might chasten or humiliate his hosts. He presented himself strictly as the head of state and not as the leader of a triumphant political party.

In the ensuing years the New England states capitulated, and all but Massachusetts were in Democratic-Republican Party hands. De-Federalization was virtually complete by 1820, the appointment of former Federalist Party members seemed in order, and Monroe feared a backlash. Most anti-Federalist sentiments were political posturing, but he was not so secure of support for his domestic and foreign programs and was concerned at the mounting hostilities over the upcoming presidential contest in 1824, a purely intraparty affair. He never consummated his final reconciliation with the Federalists.

== Failure of amalgamation and rise of the Old Republicans ==
Monroe's success in mitigating party rancor produced an appearance of political unity, with almost all Americans identifying themselves as Republicans. His nearly unanimous electoral victory for reelection in 1820 seemed to confirm this.

Recognizing the danger of intraparty rivalries, Monroe attempted to include prospective presidential candidates and top political leaders in his administration. His cabinet comprised three of the political rivals who would vie for the presidency in 1824: John Quincy Adams, John C. Calhoun and William H. Crawford. A fourth, Andrew Jackson, held high military appointments. Monroe felt he could manage the factional disputes and arrange compromise on national politics within administration guidelines. His great disadvantage was that amalgamation deprived him of appealing to solidarity that would have cleared the way for passage of his programs in Congress.

"From the moment that Monroe adopted as his guiding principle the maxim that he was head of a nation, not the leader of a party, he repudiated for all practical purposes the party unity" that would have served to establish his policies. The result was a loss of party discipline. Absent was the universal adherence to the precepts of Jeffersonianism: state sovereignty, strict construction and stability of Southern institutions. Old Republican critics of the new nationalism, among them John Randolph of Roanoke, Virginia, had warned that the abandonment of the Jeffersonian scheme of Southern preeminence would provoke a sectional conflict, North and South, that would threaten the union. Former president James Madison had cautioned Monroe that in any free government, it was natural that party identity would take shape.

The disastrous Panic of 1819 and the Supreme Court's McCulloch v. Maryland reanimated the disputes over the supremacy of state sovereignty and federal power, between strict construction of the US Constitution and loose construction. The Missouri Crisis in 1820 made the explosive political conflict between slave and free soil open and explicit. Only through the adroit handling of the legislation by Speaker of the House Henry Clay was a settlement reached and disunion avoided.

With the decline in political consensus, it became imperative to revive Jeffersonian principles on the basis of Southern exceptionalism. The agrarian alliance, North and South, would be revived to form Jacksonian nationalism and the rise of the modern Democratic Party. The interlude of the Era of Good Feelings was at an end.

== Primary sources ==
- Remini, Robert Vincent, and Edwin A. Miles, ed. The Era of Good Feelings and the Age of Jackson, 1816–1841 (1979). online
- Patricia L. Dooley, ed. (2004). The Early Republic: Primary Documents on Events from 1799 to 1820. Greenwood. p. 298ff. ISBN 9780313320842. text of Benjamin Russell editorial
- "President Madison's Veto Message". March 3, 1817. Archived from the original on March 4, 2016.
- "President Monroe's Veto Message". May 4, 1822. Archived from the original on February 11, 2018.
- "President Monroe's Views of the President of the United States on the Subject of Internal Improvements". May 4, 1822. Archived from the original on February 5, 2018.
