= Soupe kandia =

Senegalese okra soup

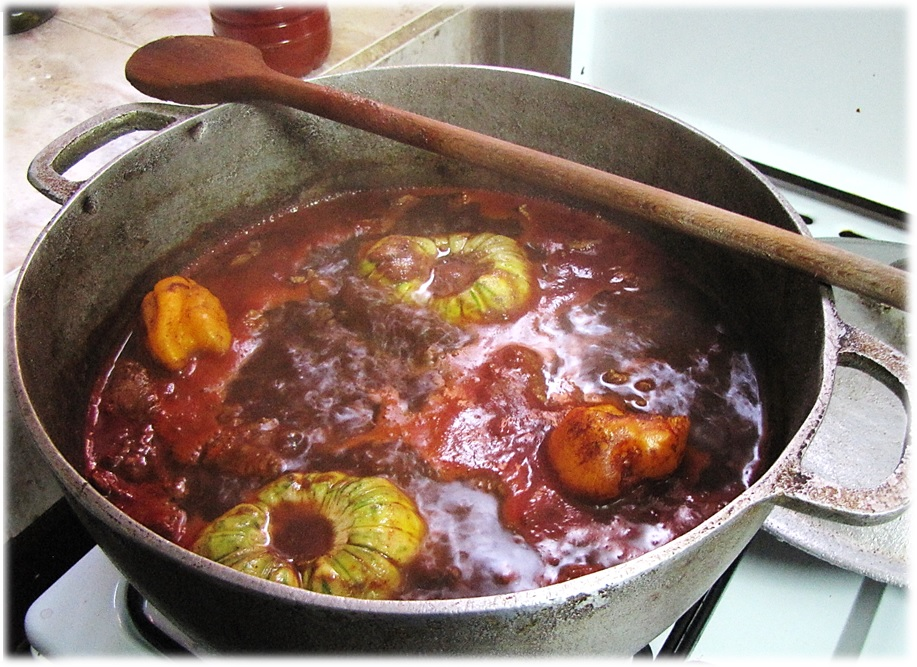
- Type: sauce/gravy
- Place of origin: Côte d'Ivoire, Senegal
- Serving temperature: hot
- Main ingredients: Okra
- Ingredients generally used: Fish/seafood, vegetables

Soup kandia (also soupe kandja or kandia soup) is a traditional West African soup widely consumed in countries such as Côte d'Ivoire, Guinea, Senegal, and Mali. It is especially popular among Mandinka, Wolof, and Dioula communities. The dish is primarily made with okra (ladies' fingers), which gives it a slimy texture, and is often flavoured with palm oil, smoked or dried fish, and local seasonings. It likely shares a historical origin with gumbo and pepper pot soup.

== Preparation ==
The main ingredient in soup kandia is okra, known locally as kandia. The okra is typically sliced thinly and simmered until it becomes soft and releases a viscous, mucilaginous texture. Other common Ingredients include palm oil, onion, garlic, fresh or dried chili peppers, tomatoes, smoked or dried fish, crayfish or shrimp, meat, and bouillon.

Soupe kandia is traditionally served with a starchy accompaniment such as rice, fufu (cassava or plantain mash), tô (millet or sorghum paste), and acheke (fermented cassava couscous). The soup is usually enjoyed as a communal meal and is served in both everyday households and on special occasions.
