= Quilting Frolic =

1813 genre painting by John Lewis Krimmel

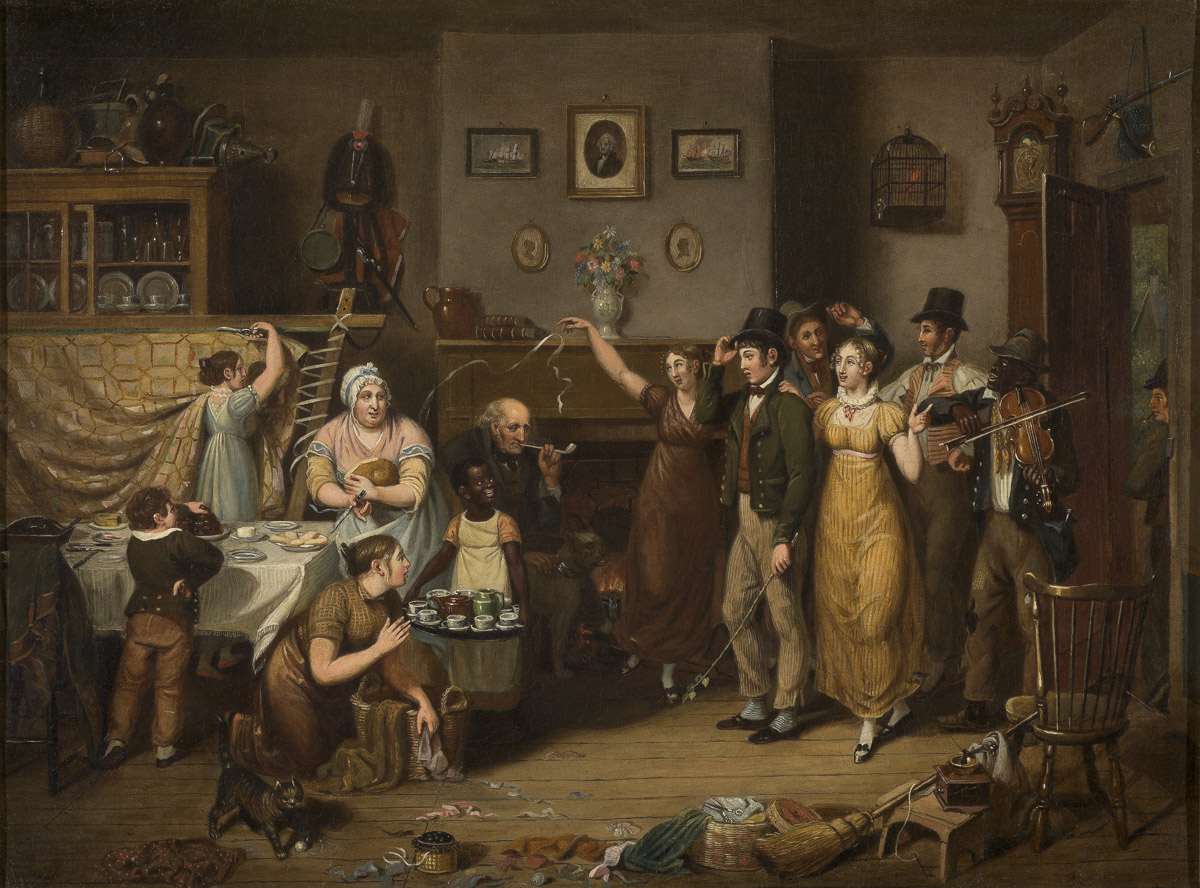
- Artist: John Lewis Krimmel
- Year: 1813
- Medium: Oil on canvas
- Movement: Genre painting
- Dimensions: 42.862 cm × 56.833 cm (16.875 in × 22.375 in)
- Location: Winterthur Museum, Garden and Library, Delaware, United States

Quilting Frolic is an oil-on-canvas genre painting by American artist John Lewis Krimmel (1786–1821). It was painted in Philadelphia in 1813. Purchased in 1953, the work is held in the permanent collection of the Winterthur Museum, Garden and Library. The painting depicts an interior domestic scene of merrymaking with a Black child serving and a Black fiddler entertaining partygoers celebrating completion of a quilt.

== History and description ==
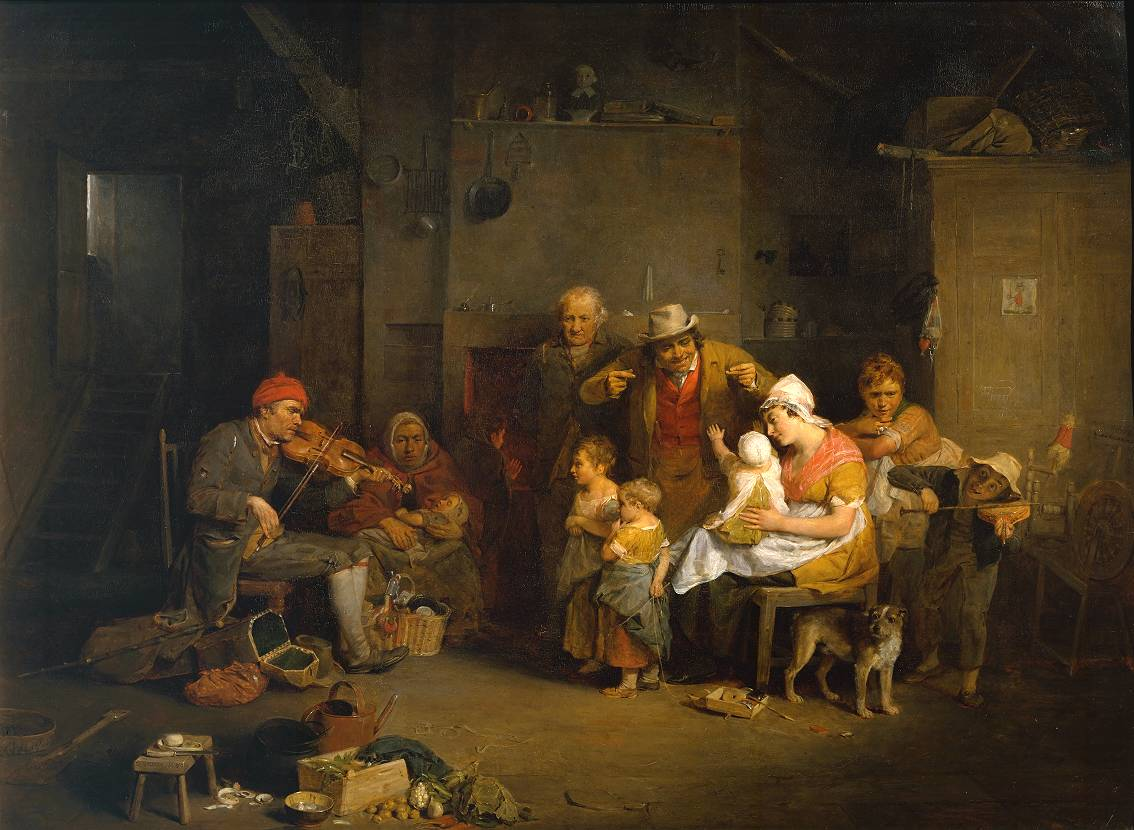
Wilkie's The Blind Fiddler (1806) inspired Krimmel's Quilting Frolic

Krimmel produced Quilting Frolic to feature in a May 1813 exhibition at the Pennsylvania Academy of the Fine Arts, of which he was a member. The painting was intended as a companion piece to Krimmel's copy of David Wilkie's The Blind Fiddler (1806). He copied Wilkie's painting after John Burnet's 1811 engraving and exhibited the reproduction besides Quilting Frolic at the Philadelphia Academy exhibition in 1813.

The painting was sold during Krimmel's lifetime to U.S. Navy officer Alexander Murray and went through several owners after Murray's death in 1820. It was exhibited at the Boston Athenaeum in 1829. Its history is unknown between 1829 and 1953, when it was sold by Child's Gallery of Boston to the Old Print Shop of New York City. The Winterthur Museum purchased the painting from the Old Print Shop later that year.

== Description and analysis ==
The painting depicts a middle-class American household during the early 19th century. The longcase clock, the birdcage, the pictures above the fireplace, and other features suggest that the household is well-off but not wealthy. Milo Naeve described Quilting Frolic as an "accurate record of costume, furnishings, and room arrangements of the period." Befitting its creation during the War of 1812, the painting features patriotic military imagery — the portrait of George Washington above the fireplace is flanked by a pair of images of American warships defeating British ships in 1812 naval battles, while a soldier's hat and gear hang on the wall to the left. Krimmel imitates Wilkie's style, using "a central fireplace and a balanced composition that is set in a Dutch-box space with the background wall parallel to the picture frame." Artificial lighting and dense still-life details evoke classic Dutch paintings of tavern and domestic scenes. "The atmosphere," observed Edgar Preston Richardson, "is of cheerful, disorderly domesticity."

Two Black figures appear in the scene. A Black child servant (possibly enslaved) carries a tea tray, while a Black man playing a fiddle accompanies the visiting revelers, evoking the minstrel show stereotype of Black performers. Krimmel exaggerated the figures' physiognomy, endowing them with very dark skin, broad white-toothed grins, and oversized lips. Curator Guy McElroy declared that "Krimmel's enthusiastic embodiment of the comic darkey stereotype" in Quilting Frolic "established a precedent that future artists, seeking to label their scenes as distinctly American, would either wholeheartedly or unthinkingly emulate."

The painting received favorable contemporary notice, with an anonymous reviewer in the Port Folio, a Philadelphia literary magazine, commenting that "the subject is good and executed with great judgment, and if Mr. Krimmel only perseveres in the path he has chosen, we are decidedly of opinion that his labours and talents will contribute largely towards giving a character to the arts in our country." The reviewer continued, "We can perceive strong marks of the genius of the painter" because the "composition, drawing, coloring, and effect display much knowledge of the true principles of art." Richardson acknowledged the artist's originality: "Nothing like the humorous genre scenes he painted had appeared before in the United States."
