= Pepper Pot Centre =

British charity

- Founded: 1981; 45 years ago
- Founder: Pansy Jeffrey
- Type: Charity
- Location: Ladbroke Grove, West London
- Key people: Howard Jeffrey (chair)
- Website: www.pepperpotcentre.org.uk

The Pepper Pot Centre (PPC), also known as the Pepperpot Club, is a British charity based in Ladbroke Grove, West London, that for four decades has been supporting elderly people from the African, Caribbean and BME communities in the London Borough of Kensington and Chelsea, offering a meal service as well as information and advice on social and health issues and benefits. The Pepper Pot was founded in 1981 by Pansy Jeffrey, a community activist from the Windrush generation, with the original aim of providing "a culturally sensitive drop-in centre for recently retired, redundant or disabled members of the elderly African Caribbean community". The Pepper Pot Centre was visited by The Queen on its opening in Ladbroke Grove in 1981. and again on its 25th anniversary, in 2005. In October 2020, during the COVID-19 pandemic, the centre was visited by Camilla, Duchess of Cornwall, who witnessed how "this hub for older people has continued to support vulnerable members of the community throughout lockdown".

== History ==
The Pepper Pot Centre (PPC) was established in 1981 by Guyanese-born social worker and nurse Pansy Jeffrey (8 February 1926 – 30 March 2017), the first centre to serve the needs of and act as a "safe haven" for elderly members of the growing generation of Caribbean people in West London affected by racial discrimination, isolation, depression and loneliness.

Pansy Jeffrey had moved from British Guiana to England in the early 1950s, an era when many from the Caribbean responded to Britain's nursing needs in the aftermath of World War II, and she worked as a nurse for St Charles' Hospital, midwife for Hammersmith Hospital and a health visitor for the London Borough of Camden. After being appointed as a social worker by Kensington Citizens Advice Bureau (CAB) to try to improve race relations in the area following the Notting Hill race riots of 1958, she helped set up the Notting Hill Social Council and the Notting Hill Housing Trust. It had become apparent to her by the end of the 1970s that many elderly people of Caribbean origin were suffering in increasing numbers from isolation and loneliness, so in 1980 she opened a drop-in centre for them from her office, and this evolved into the Pepper Pot Club, which later relocated to operate as a day-centre from purpose-built accommodation in Ladbroke Grove, with Jeffrey as president for Life. The PPC's name derives from a popular Guyanese dish, of Amerindian origin, known as "pepperpot".

Queen Elizabeth II was at the opening of the Pepper Pot Centre in 1981, visited it on its 25th anniversary in 2006, and on Pansy Jeffrey's 90th-birthday in 2016 sent a letter expressing good wishes. Camilla, Duchess of Cornwall, visited the PPC on 21 October 2020, joining a video call to hear about how the members of the centre had been participating in virtual group activities throughout the COVID-19 pandemic. The PPC, which provides its community of almost 500 users with meals, care and advice on access to services for the over-50s, has continued to support its members during the pandemic through a meal delivery service and regular phone calls.

The current chair of the centre is Howard Jeffrey MBE, son of founder Pansy Jeffrey and her husband Lionel Jeffrey (9 January 1926 – 31 October 1993), who was also an activist and a founding member of Caribbean Labour Solidarity.
