= Fourth of July Celebration in Centre Square =

1812 genre painting by John Lewis Krimmel

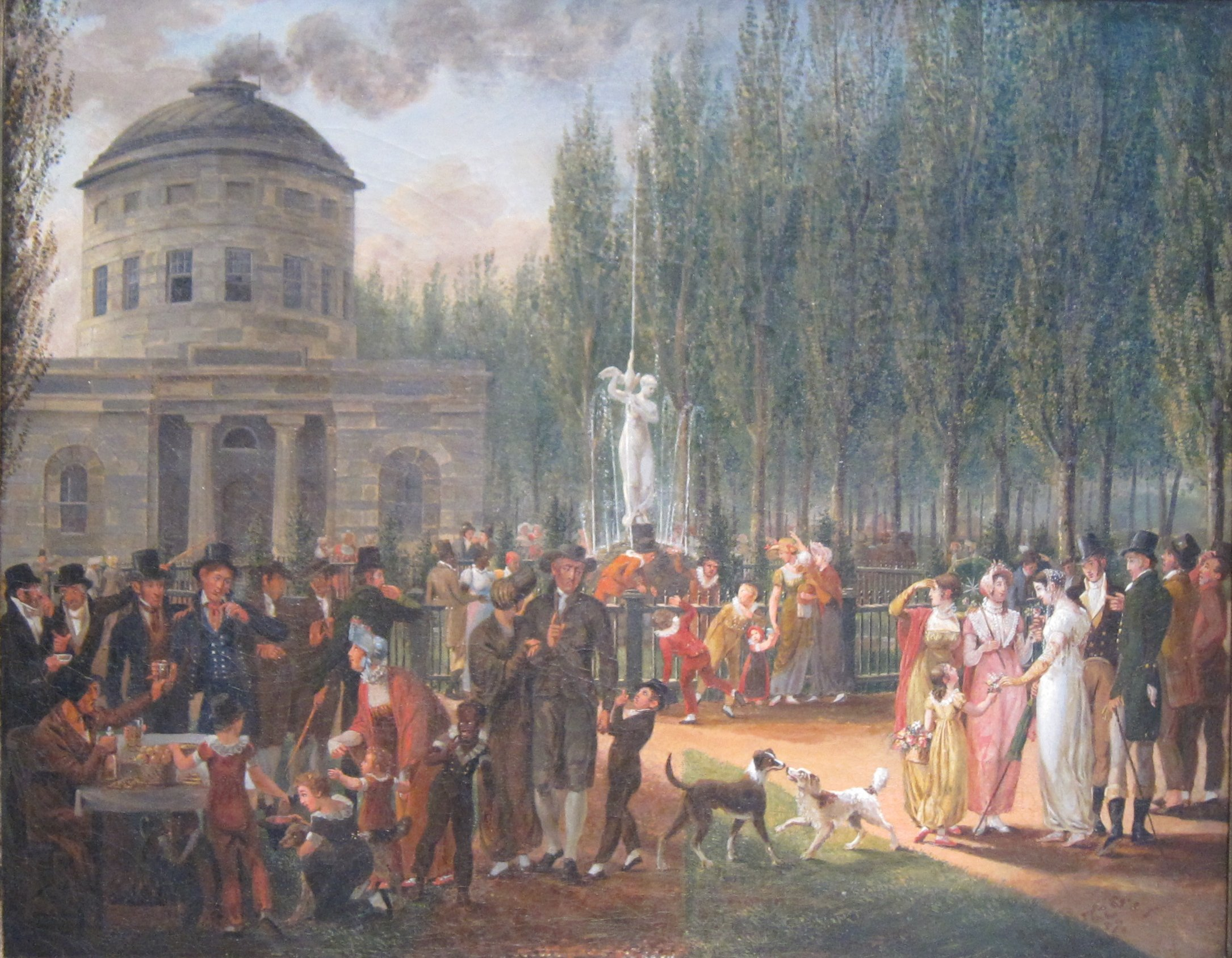
- Artist: John Lewis Krimmel
- Year: 1812
- Medium: Oil on canvas
- Movement: Genre painting
- Dimensions: 57.785 cm × 73.66 cm (22.750 in × 29.00 in)
- Location: Pennsylvania Academy of the Fine Arts, Philadelphia, U.S.

Fourth of July Celebration in Centre Square is an oil-on-canvas genre painting by John Lewis Krimmel (1786–1821). The painting was first exhibited in Philadelphia in 1812 and was purchased by the Pennsylvania Academy of the Fine Arts in 1845. It depicts a diverse crowd of Philadelphia's citizens mingling in the public square.

== Description and analysis ==
Like many of Krimmel's paintings, Fourth of July Celebration in Centre Square depicts a bustling street scene. The location is the public square at Broad and Market Streets, the site of present-day Philadelphia City Hall. Some 50 people enjoy an Independence Day outing in the sunshine, gathering in conversation or buying food and beer from a street vendor tabling on the lower left. The presence of the old woman selling alcoholic drinks is considered to be a moralizing statement against alcohol. The crowd is diverse in ethnicity, sex, age, and class, with smartly dressed ladies and gentlemen, austerely dressed Quakers, and black Philadelphians (Krimmel was among the first U.S. artists to paint free African Americans). Two playful dogs sniff noses in the center foreground.

Krimmel depicted crowd members reacting to the female nude statue, as a commentary on public consumption of art. Country bumpkins gape in amazement, a fashionable lady shades her eyes to see more clearly, mischievous boys clamber over the fence encircling the sculpture, a well-dressed Black couple stand nearby, and a plainly dressed Quaker man lectures his son while his wife furtively peers at the statue over his shoulder.

In the background looms a Greek Revival building, the city waterworks' pumping station designed by Benjamin Henry Latrobe and celebrated as an engineering marvel. In the center of the square is a fountain with a pine statue painted to resemble marble: William Rush's Water Nymph and Bittern (1809). These architectural features symbolize Philadelphia's cultural and economic prowess.

Fourth of July was the first of Krimmel's genre scenes to be formally reviewed, in 1812. A writer in Port Folio praised the work as a "pleasing representation" that is "truly Hogarthian, and full of meaning," but complained that Krimmel's use of color, light, shade, and other technical aspects revealed his want of experience, "which can only be gained by unremitting industry and application."

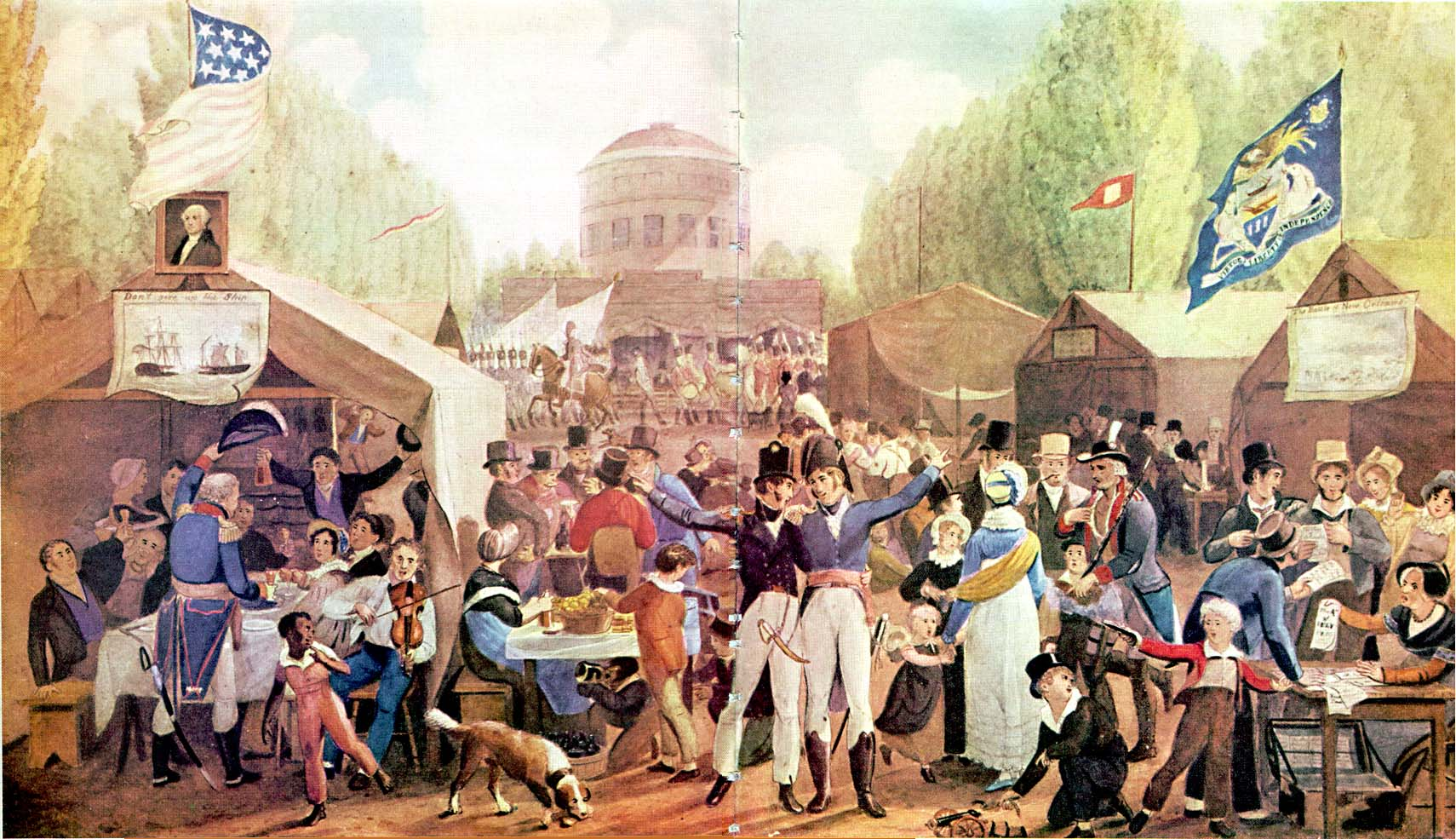
1819 Krimmel painting of a Fourth of July celebration on Centre Square, Philadelphia

== Sequel ==
Krimmel painted a sequel in 1819. Likewise entitled Fourth of July Celebration in Centre Square, this work features more patriotic and kinetic imagery, including a portrait of George Washington beneath an American flag, a painting of the Battle of New Orleans mounted below a Pennsylvania regimental flag, several men in military dress uniforms, and troops on parade in the background. Latrobe's pump house looms in the background as a symbol of Philadelphia's eminence.
