= Pepper pot soup =

Tripe soup

Philadelphia pepper pot
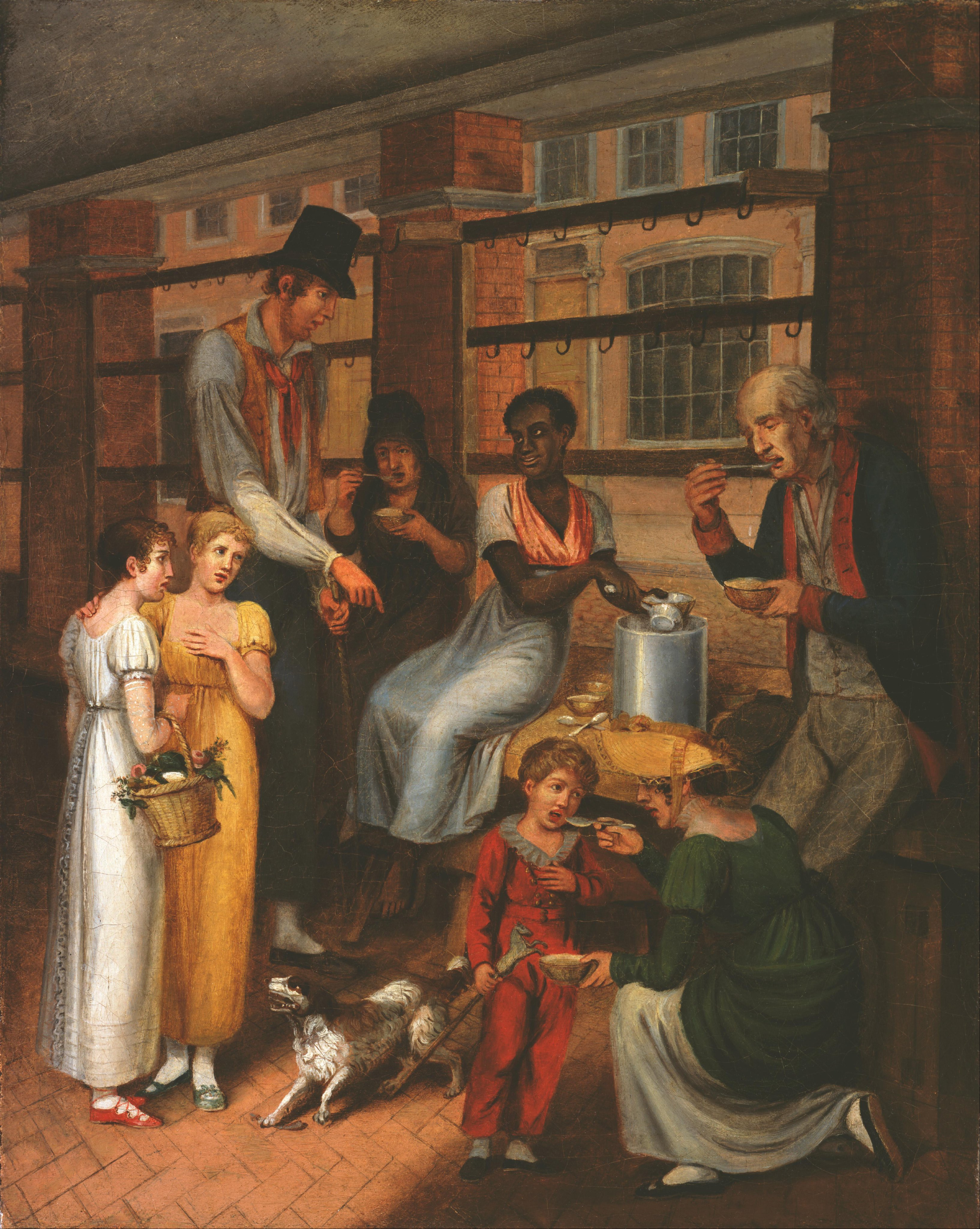
- Pepper-Pot: A Scene in the Philadelphia Market (1811) by John Lewis Krimmel; The scene depicts a pepper pot soup street vendor in Philadelphia serving soup from a pot to customers.
- Type: Soup/ Stew
- Place of origin: United States
- Region or state: Philadelphia
- Main ingredients: Beef tripe, vegetables, pepper, other seasonings

Pepper pot soup is a thick stew of beef tripe, vegetables, pepper and other seasonings. The soup was first made in South America and the Caribbean before being brought to North America through slave trade and made into a distinctively Philadelphian dish by colonial Black women during the nineteenth century.

It was one of the first street foods in the United States, sold by so-called "Pepper Pot women", and was at one point the symbolic food of the city of Philadelphia.

== History ==
=== Origin ===
Pepper pot soup shares its name with soups in the Caribbean but is credited specifically to Black Philadelphians.

According to Catherine Clinton, "steaming peppery pot was served right on the street---a dish of vegetables, meat, and cassava, imported by West Indians". Historians suggest that the soup's origin can be traced from the West Indies to the Atlantic Coast of North America, following the path of slave trade.

There are many versions and variations of Peppery Pot stew, though many include dumplings. The traditional version associated with Philadelphia specifically do have some ingredients in common: "a variety of peppers, spices, root vegetables, beef tripe, herbs, and leafy greens." These ingredients came specifically from the Africans and Caribbeans living in the city at the time of its origin. Some chefs say that it's very similar to gumbo, but does not have okra. According to Jessica B. Harris, a renowned scholar on Black diasporic cuisines, they might share similarities because they "likely share the same food "ancestors,” like Senegalese soupe kandia and Beninese sauce feuille."

William Woys Weaver, a historian of Philadelphia-area food, has noted that versions of the dish in the city can be traced as far back as the 1600s. Back then the ingredient list looked a little different: "Black women would make stock, then cook turtles, fish, veal, collards, cassava, plantains, and spices together, often served with West African fufu or moussa dumplings."

The stew was known specifically for being sold on the street and "pepper pot women" were among the Philadelphia's earliest street vendors, using 'street cries' to grab customers' attention. In a children's book from 1810 titled The Cries of Philadelphia, the scene is described in detail:

Strangers who visit the city, cannot but be amused with the cries of the numerous black women who sit in the market house and at the corners, selling a soup which they call pepperpot. It is made chiefly of tripe, ox-feet, and other cheap animal substances, with a portion of spice. It is sold very cheap, so that a hungry man may get a hearty meal for a few cents...and excepting to weak stomachs, it is a very pleasant feast.

Even as the ingredients evolved over time, historians say that the inclusion of beef tripe is what makes the stew distinctively Philadelphia pepper pot. However, not all recipes call for it; Esther Levy's Jewish Housekeepers' Cookery Book, published in 1871, calls for "a couple of pounds of mutton and a piece of nice beef." Levy's recipe eschews tripe entirely, as "Pepper pot may be made of various things." Other historians also say that a spicy capsicum pepper is another requirement; bell peppers would not have been used. (Levy, for example, uses cayenne pepper.)

=== Revolutionary War myth ===
The origins of the stew are steeped in legend, with one story attributing the dish to Christopher Ludwick, baker general of the Continental Army during the American Revolutionary War. According to this story, during the harsh winter of 1777–1778, farmers near Valley Forge sold food to the British rather than accepting the weak continental currency. The Continental Army survived on soup made of tripe, vegetables, and whatever else they could find. The story has been found to be almost certainly untrue, though it helped make the soup a symbol of the city.

In Philadelphia, legend made pepper pot soup popular and easy to find around the city. It was sold as street food and in taverns because it was known as the stew which kept George Washington's troops alive during that cold winter. Its popularity meant that it became the symbolic food of the city, "It was a dish to try if you were an out-of-towner. It was a hangover cure. Diners treated the soup sort of how we treat cheesesteaks these days."

=== Contemporary ===
Once a popular staple of the city, Philadelphia pepper pot soup disappeared and became a rarity. A canned condensed pepper pot soup was available from the Campbell's for more than a century, from 1899 until it was discontinued in 2010. A Campbell's representative gave "changing consumer tastes" as the reason for its demise.

A lasting record of pepper pot soup's not-so-distant popularity is one of Andy Warhol's iconic Campbell Soup's works. Created by Warhol in 1962, it features the Pepper Pot variety and sold in 2006 for $12 million. In 1968, the Philadelphia chapter of the Public Relations Society of America chose the Pepper Pot as the symbol for its annual awards.

By the 1990s, however, pepper pot soup was already losing popularity in restaurants and residential kitchens. The Campbell's soup was described as the canned version of "a street food that has retreated to the factory production line."

Although it is difficult to find restaurants serving Philadelphia pepper pot soup today, there are cooks in the United States who are working to restore its popularity. Noted Philadelphia chef Omar Tate, who focuses on Black heritage cooking, added pepper pot soup to his restaurant's menu. He has noted the difficulty of bringing back a dish when there are so few people to ask if it tastes as they remember it.

== Slang ==
"Pepperpot" not only describes a stew, but according to a book from 1992, it is also a dialect synonym for hodgepodge or topsy-turvy in the Middle Atlantic states.

== See also ==
- Cuisine of the Pennsylvania Dutch
- Cuisine of Philadelphia
- Guyana Pepperpot
- Jamaican pepperpot soup
- List of regional dishes of the United States
- List of stews

== Bibliography ==
- Dubourcq, Hilaire (2004). Benjamin Franklin Book of Recipes. Fly Fizzi Publishing. pp. 86–87. ISBN 1-900721-20-1.
- Weaver, William Woys (1991). "From Turtle to Tripe: Philadelphia Pepperpot, A Street Food from the West Indies". In Walker, Harlan (ed.). Oxford Symposium on Food and Cookery 1991: Public Eating. London: Prospect Books. pp. 287–294. ISBN 0-907325-47-5. OCLC 28534676.
