= Jamaican pepperpot soup =

Jamaican soup

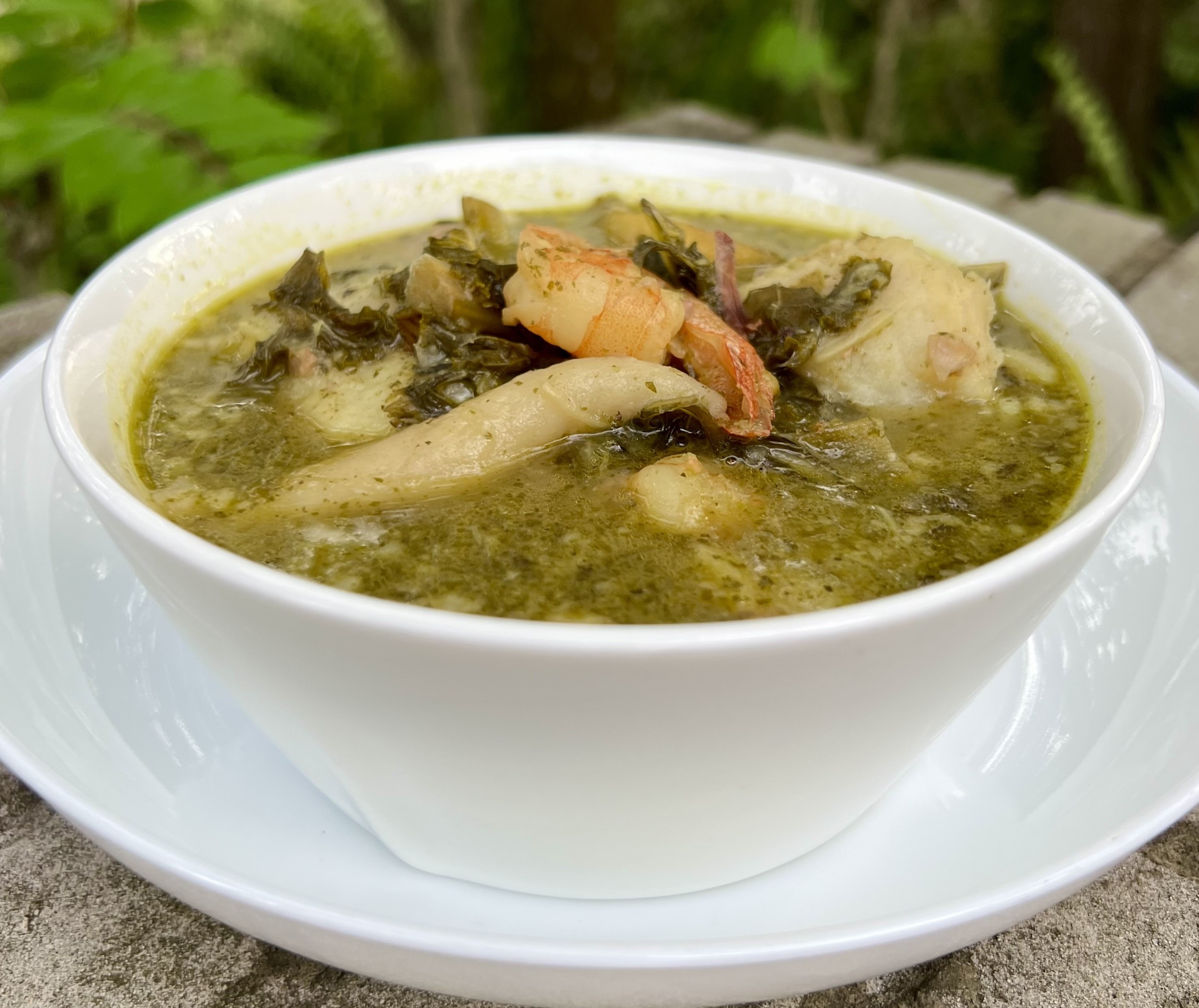
- Jamaican pepperpot with salted meats, seafood, root vegetables and spinners.
- Course: Soup
- Place of origin: Jamaica
- Created by: Arawaks (Taínos/Caribs)
- Main ingredients: Callaloo (native amaranth), cured meats, coconut milk, herbs, spices, peppers, pimento and ground provisions
- Variations: Callaloo soup (Caribbean); Bouyon (or bouillon) (Haiti); Pepperpot (Americas)

Jamaican pepperpot soup or Jamaican pepperpot is a Jamaican soup of Amerindian origin. The dish is similar to callaloo soups prepared throughout the Caribbean and some pepperpot dishes made in the Americas. It includes amaranth (known locally as callaloo), along with cured meats, coconut milk, root vegetables, dumplings, and a blend of fresh herbs and spices like Scotch bonnet, pimento, and scallion.

== History ==
=== Origin ===
Jamaican pepperpot soup is a Creole dish which dates back to pre-Columbian times, originating from the native Arawak/Taíno people. The dish was a mainstay of the Taínos, who kept a clay stockpot in which meat, fish and vegetables were combined for soup, thus influencing Jamaican soups including pepperpot soup.

Historically, the dish featured fish, shellfish and local meats such as iguanas, coneys (hutias) or birds as key sources of protein. The Taínos also cultivated staple crops of indigenous, Mesoamerican and Amazonian origin, including sweet potato, arrowroot, chayote (cho cho), coco (or malanga), pumpkin, yam (yampi or cush-cush yam), potato, cassava, peppers (including Scotch bonnet, bird pepper and cayenne pepper) and pimento, most of which are still included in present-day Jamaican pepperpot recipes. Callaloo which grew wild, usually native Amaranthus viridis, Amaranthus dubius (Spanish callaloo) and Xanthosoma (coco/malanga leaves or Indian kale) have been used as prominent ingredient.

By the 15th century, the Spaniards colonized Jamaica and introduced cattle, pigs, other livestock and saltfish to the island. Consequently, they adapted the dish and contributed the use of beef chuck and cured meats like pickled pigtail, salted beef and pork, which are typically used in modern recipes. They also introduced other key ingredients including onion, thyme, carrot, garlic and other vegetables and herbs. The use of dasheen, yam and okra was influenced by the Africans who arrived during slavery and indentureship, and the use of scallion was influenced by Chinese indentured labourers, but was introduced to the island by the indentured East Indians along with cannabis— green ganja was listed as an ingredient in recipes for Jamaican pepperpot and Rastafarian callaloo soup in 1972. By the 1960s, the introduction of callaloo and its use in the dish had been incorrectly associated with the East Indians, because they were the main cultivators of vegetables by the 1930s, and Indian women were commonly associated with selling callaloo during that period.

=== Development of Jamaican pepperpot ===
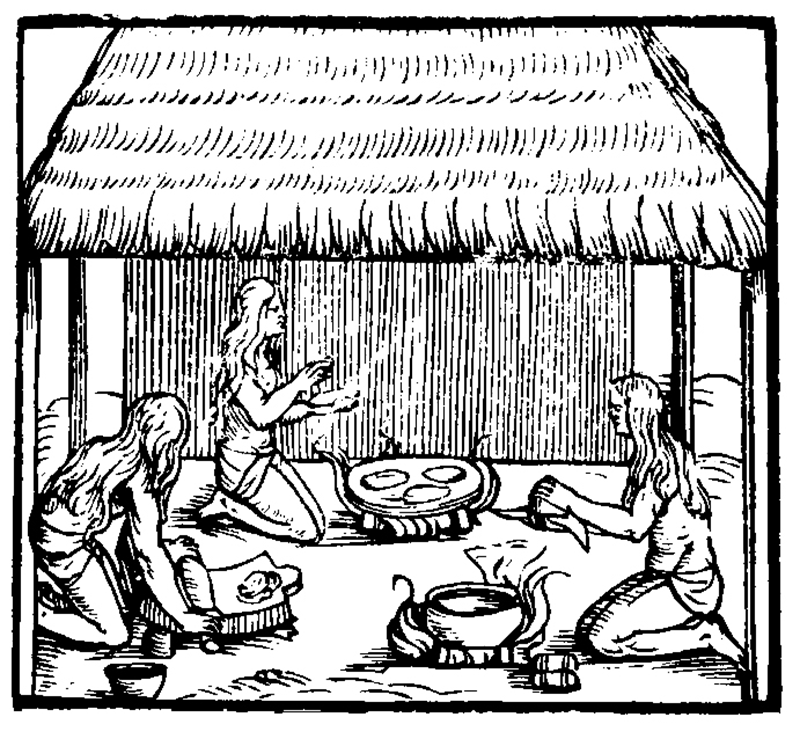
Taíno (Arawak) women preparing casabe (bammy) and pepperpot in 1565.

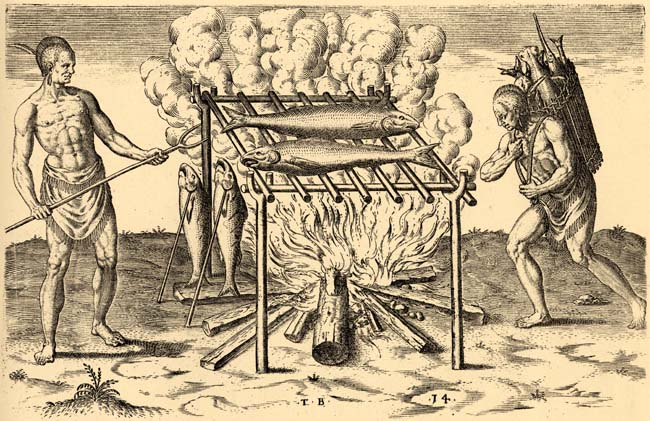
Taíno barabicu or barbacoa used for roasting and smoking meat/fish (for preservation and flavour), before adding to pepperpot.

==== Pre-colonial version ====
Early accounts by Spanish historian Gonzalo Fernández de Oviedo y Valdés recognized pepperpot (ajiaco) as a Taíno communal staple, which was highly seasoned with local hot peppers (red peppers and Scotch bonnet) and pimento. According to Cuban anthropologist, Fernando Ortiz, “ajiaco” derived from ají, the Taíno word for "hot pepper". The dish was described as a rich, versatile stew or soup which slowly simmered in a large clay pot over a low fire, with new ingredients added over extended periods. It contained a variety of vegetables and tubers including batata (sweet potato), yuca (sweet and bitter cassava), yautía/iautía (coco), chayote (cho cho), foraged leafy greens like Indian kale (coco leaves) and callaloo. They often prepared meats and fish on a barbacoa before adding them to the stew/soup. Sometimes, meats were wrapped in papaya leaves to tenderize them before curing. Typical meats included coney, agouti, iguana, wild hog (peccary), wild birds, waterfowl, turtle etc., while a variety of fish and shellfish included crayfish, grouper, parrotfish, snapper, shark, lobster, conch, whelk, crab and others. While making casabe (bammy), Arawakan tribes would extract poisonous juice from bitter cassava, which was boiled to remove the poison and then used as the liquid base for casiripe (also referred to as casserepo, kaseripu or cassiripo in Cariban languages), used in pepperpot as a preservative and seasoning. Pepperpot was served in calabashes (gourd bowls).

==== Colonial versions ====
During early colonization, Spanish conquistadors adopted Taíno foods including pepperpot, in order to survive. According to Oviedo and other chroniclers, despite initially struggling to adapt native diet and reluctance to eat local game, they considered it a valuable food source and delicacy. With the introduction of livestock (pig, cattle and chicken) to the island in the 1500s, salted pork, pigtail and beef replaced indigenous game (wild meats) in the dish. Meats were primarily cured using the traditional Spanish method of salting/drying, as well as adopting the Taíno method of smoking over a barbacoa, using pimento wood and berries for flavour and preservation. The dish continued to feature fish and shellfish, and additional ingredients like garlic, onion, thyme and carrot introduced by the Spanish were incorporated.

Though Jamaican pepperpot has prominently featured cassava (and leafy greens), the dish has been most closely associated with callaloo as a soup, in contrast to the meaty Guyanese pepperpot and thick callaloo stews made across the region. However, some recipes varied throughout history with the arrival of the Africans, incorporating additional ingredients such as saltfish, West African yams, dasheen and okra. The British also adapted the dish.

In the 1760s, John Lindsay mentioned saltfish as an ingredient:

...pepper-pots—the favourite pottage of this hot climate—being a soop made very thick with tender greens of any sort, and meats of any sort, generally indeed salt meats, or salt fish, were always highly seasoned with the peppers of this climate, to make it agreeable to the tone of relax'd stomach's.

An anonymous author who wrote about the Creoles and Africans on the island, in the 1770s said:

The soup known by the name pepper-pot, is a favourite dish; in the composition of which they use calilue of several sorts, ochros, plantanes, yams, cocos, salted meat and fish, and kayan pepper.

From the late 18th century to early 19th century, several British chroniclers mentioned okra over callaloo in descriptions of pepperpot and related stews and soups. In 1788, Peter Marsden described okra as "the chief ingredient in a dish called pepper-pot; red pepper, and a little salt beef, are boiled with it till the soup becomes rich". John Payne, 18th-century British geographer, wrote about "a favourite olio" with okra and "native growths, especially the chocho, Lima-bean, and Indian kale”, which “are more agreeable than any of the excellent vegetables of Europe. The other indigenous productions of this class are plantains, bananas, yams of several varieties, calalue (a species of spinnage), eddoes, cassavi, and sweet potatoes. A mixture of these, stewed with salted fish or salted meat of any kind, and highly seasoned with Cayenne-pepper…"

The 1820s book, Marly, written by a Scottish planter depicted pepperpot as a staple in Jamaican cuisine which was enjoyed by all classes and races, including the white elite. It was described as "a sort of hodge-podge called okra pepper-pot" and a "thick soup". The author wrote:

..a favourite dish with all creoles, and those long-colonized, and may be called the Currie of the West Indies. It is a soup, in general prepared from the land crabs which abound in the island, thickened with vegetables, especially with a very small pea denominated by the negroes, okra, a kind of what is called squashies, and highly seasoned with the long pepper of the island. Creole epicures are fondest of the crab kind, but when these animals are awanting, they supply their place with salt fish or salt meat, and sometimes even with fresh meat.

Although 18th-century recipes with okra varied, callaloo remained a fundamental component in Jamaican pepperpot soup throughout its history. Matthew Gregory Lewis noted in his Journal of a West India Proprietor that "catalue (a species of spinach) is a principal article in their pepper-pots".

In 1873, Charles Rampini had pepperpot at Chapelton, seemingly made by a white Creole whereby he contrasted this with the Demerara pepperpot, and vividly described Jamaican pepperpot’s appearance as:

...a rich succulent potage, a very Meg Merrilees [the gypsy of Walter Scott's novel Guy Mannering] broth of pork and beef and fowl, ochroes and calaloo (the West Indian spinach), peppers, crayfish and negro yam; in colour a dark green, with the scarlet prawns appearing through the chaotic mass not unpicturesquely.

Rampini also mentioned that Africans added ingredients to the dish, including native plants like cotton tree tips and night-blooming cereus (associated with the Taínos), and bamboo shoots typically eaten by Asian indentured labourers— "With the negroes, pepper-pot is a compound of the most heterogeneous description. Prawns or crayfish of some kind are de rigueur, but bamboo tops, cotton-tree tips, cabbage, pimpernel, pulse, and even the buds of the night-blowing cereus, occasionally find a place in this concoction".

The 1893 cookbook by Caroline Sullivan included a soup recipe for "pepper pot" that retained certain features of earlier versions—most notably the use of cassaripe, while lacking other essential ingredients, such as leafy greens and root vegetables. The recipe also included hard-boiled eggs.

Get an earthen vessel. To every quart of cold water, add three tablespoonfuls of the pure cassaripe with salt to taste and a handful of bird peppers. If these cannot be had, use some cayenne. Cut the meat into small pieces after being well cooked, and put into the pot: boil well for half an hour. Any sort of meat may be used, all mixed in it, and hard boiled eggs are an improvement. It should be warmed every day, and something added each day.

Some of those ingredients appeared in the "ochro soup" recipe, made with "Indian kale or callilu" chopped fine, along with okra, salt beef and a little salt pork, some black crabs, tomatoes, escallion and thyme.".

==== Soup status ====
By the late 19th century, Jamaican pepperpot had become clearly defined as a soup rather than a stew, though it remained notably thicker than other lighter Jamaican soups. In the 1920s, Martha Beckwith, American ethnographer, described pepperpot as "a kind of vegetable soup composed of a leaf or two of cabbage, callalu, young chocho vine (a kind of cucumber), pumpkin, broad and sugar beans, tomato and okra, boiled with salt beef or pork and flavoured with red peppers".

==== Callaloo in pepperpot ====
Some writers assert that, by tradition Jamaican pepperpot soup must be made with callaloo, whether or not it is prepared with other edible leafy greens. However, the dish was clearly distinguished from callaloo soup by the 20th century, and it continued to feature indigenous characteristics.

Pepperpot and callaloo soup are sometimes conflated due their similarities as a variation, with callaloo soup becoming more prominent in the 20th century. By 1926, Jamaican author, H. G. de Lisser, remarked that it was so well known that anyone claiming not to have heard of it would seem unbelievable. In 1937, he described “callaloo water” as a real soup, emphasizing its nutritional value, particularly its high iron content, and its appeal as a palatable dish. Since callaloo grew wild, he noted that it was widely accessible, though he believed it had become less popular over time due to the prevalence of new trends or changing tastes. Conflating the varieties of pepperpot, he recalled traditional pepperpot preparation in a lighthearted tone:

In days of yore callalu leaves and tender stems were chopped fine and placed in a huge receptacle to boil along with bits of beef, pork, poultry, fish, with shrimps and crayfish also, and yam, green plantain and foodstuffs of that kind". The other vital ingredient was "country peppers". In those days, "the pot, once put on upon the fire, ceased never to boil. Day by day more callalu was added, more water, more fish and meat and all the rest, like Elijah's cruse of oil, it was always being replenished and always being drawn upon.

By November 1939, de Lisser even promoted such soups as practical wartime meals, highlighting the everlasting nature and readily available ingredients of traditional Taíno pepperpot— "rather like the old Jamaica Pepper Pot, which, according to tradition and history, was always boiling, was composed of all sorts of meat and vegetables with callalu as one of its main ingredients, and had plenty of 'country pepper' to scald the mouth and bring tears to the eyes. [. . .] By eating more of it in the future we may help to win the war".

After 1945, pepperpot and callaloo soup became increasingly intertwined, though the distinction was preserved. Pepperpot was described as a “national dish” by 1972, but, in its traditional form, pepperpot soup became less common in everyday Jamaican households and was found mainly in restaurants and hotels.

=== Metaphor for Jamaican identity ===
In Marly, Jamaican pepperpot was famously described as a "conglomerated mess", as the dish contains an array of ingredients combined in a single pot. The author (a Scotsman who lived on a Jamaican estate) used the dish as a metaphor for the complex and "mixed" nature of Jamaican colonial society. Jamaica's social fabric was composed of diverse and often conflicting elements, and just as the pepperpot was created from ingredients with various cultural/social significance, it reflected the hierarchical social structure established by colonial rule. The adaptation and shared consumption of this indigenous dish underscored the cultural hybridization (and contradictions) inherent in plantation life, where influences from multiple ethnic groups converged in the kitchen, though not entirely reconcilable, even as underlying social tensions remained.

== Preparation ==
Jamaican pepperpot soup is prepared by boiling the meat (fresh beef chuck, pigtail, salted beef, corned pork or ham hock) with ground provisions and vegetables including Irish potato, sweet potato, chayote (cho cho), coco, carrot, yam, dasheen and cassava. Sometimes, the soup is made with seafood, spicy sausages, chicken, green banana, plantain, kale, spinach or breadfruit. Older recipes from the early 1970s listed susumba as an optional ingredient. Other key ingredients include callaloo, coconut milk, thyme, garlic, onion, Scotch bonnet (or cayenne pepper), pimento, scallion, okra, spices, soup mix and slender flour dumplings called spinners. Jamaican Rastafarians usually make an ital (meatless) version. The soup which is savory or spicy, thick in consistency and hearty, is served hot as a complete meal.

== See also ==
- Jamaican cuisine
- Bammy
- Callaloo
- Indigenous cuisine of the Americas
- Guyanese pepperpot
- Tacacá
- Philadelphia pepper pot
- Red peas soup
