= Election Day in Philadelphia =

1815 genre painting by John Lewis Krimmel

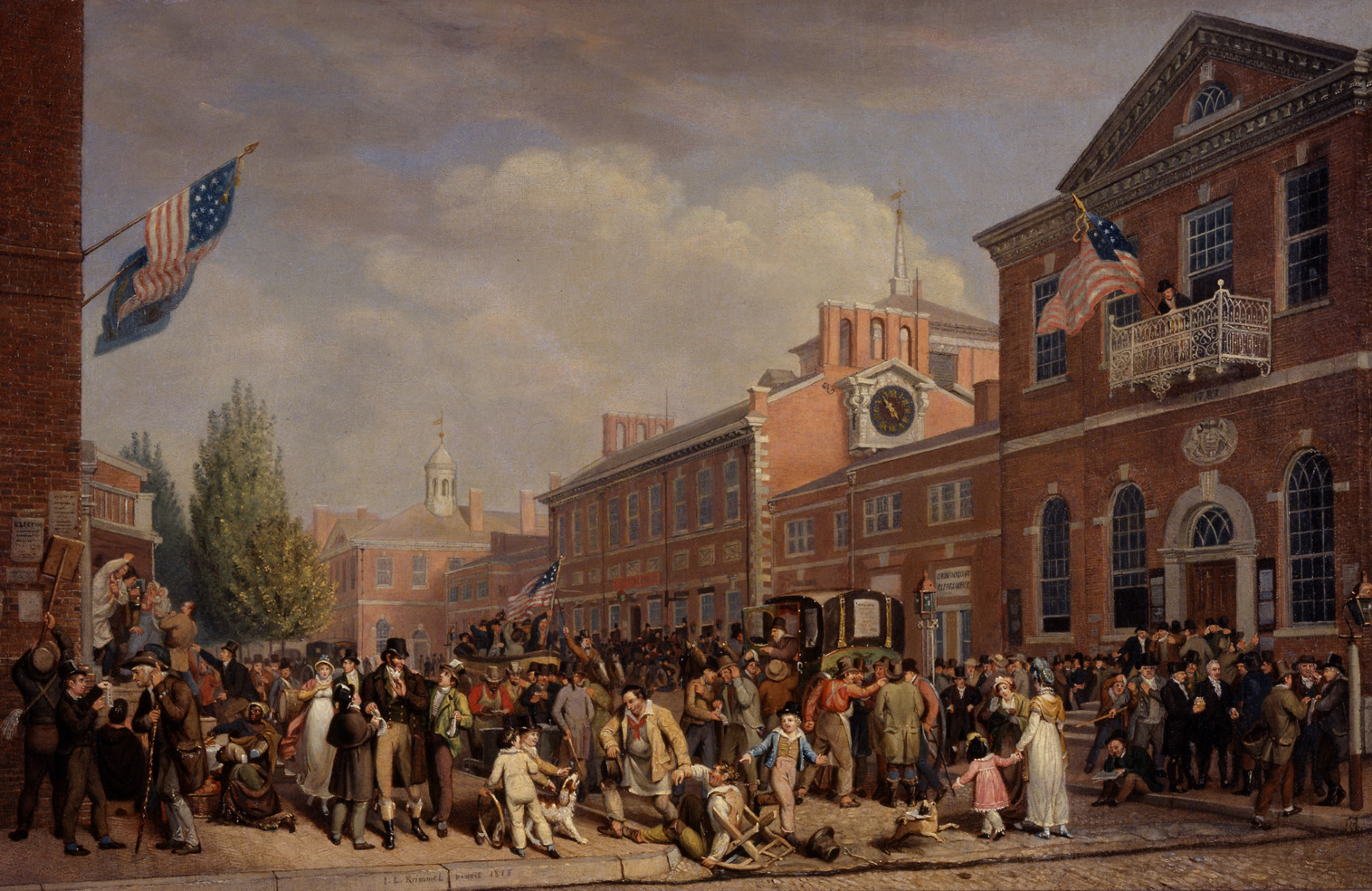
- Artist: John Lewis Krimmel
- Year: 1815
- Medium: Oil on canvas
- Movement: Genre painting
- Dimensions: 41.4 cm × 64.65 cm (16.3 in × 25.45 in)
- Location: Winterthur Museum, Garden and Library, Winterthur, Delaware, US

Election Day in Philadelphia is an oil-on-canvas genre painting by American artist John Lewis Krimmel (1786–1821). It was painted in Philadelphia in 1815. Purchased with funds provided by Henry Francis du Pont, the work is held in the permanent collection of the Winterthur Museum, Garden and Library. The painting depicts grassroots democratic participation in the early Republic, with a raucous crowd gathered outside Independence Hall to celebrate and engage in electoral politics.

== Background ==
Krimmel painted the scene in 1815 at the encouragement of his friend Alexander Lawson, an engraver who commissioned the painting or purchased it to engrave. Lawson spent two years working on the engraving but for unknown reasons never completed it. In 1887, Lawson's daughter Mary donated the unfinished copperplate to the Pennsylvania Academy of the Fine Arts, which made prints based on it. Collector James L. Claghorn donated Krimmel's watercolor version of the painting from 1816 to the Historical Society of Pennsylvania in 1873. The Winterthur Museum, using funds offered for this purpose by Henry Francis du Pont, purchased the original painting in 1959, and it has remained in Winterthur's collection ever since.

== Description and analysis ==
Election Day in Philadelphia is a genre painting of a "bustling streetscape" on Chestnut Street outside Independence Hall. Highlights include a parade towing an election float shaped like a longboat, a man pasting flyers on a wall, a brawl spilling out of a tavern, a drunk sprawled in the gutter, children and dogs playing in the street, and many groups of men and women in animated discussion. The crowd is a mix of upper-class folk and laborers, including at least three African Americans. The figures are crisply rendered in great detail given the painting's relatively small size. Despite this "raucous tableaux" that echoes William Hogarth's satirical election series (1754–55), the flying of three American flags outside a landmark of American independence "legitimize[s] popular democracy ... by tying it to the patriotic ferment of the American Revolution."

In 1834, William Dunlap characterized Election Day as "filled with miniature portraits of the well-known electioneering politicians of the day." Ross Barrett has criticized this "misreading" that "elided the democratic crowd at the picture’s center" and reflected the "politicized foci and blind spots that republican aesthetics inscribed into the visual field of early American art." Edgar P. Richardson called the painting one of the "most important views of American civic life that we have from the early Republic."
