= Pepper-Pot: A Scene in the Philadelphia Market =

1811 genre painting by John Lewis Krimmel

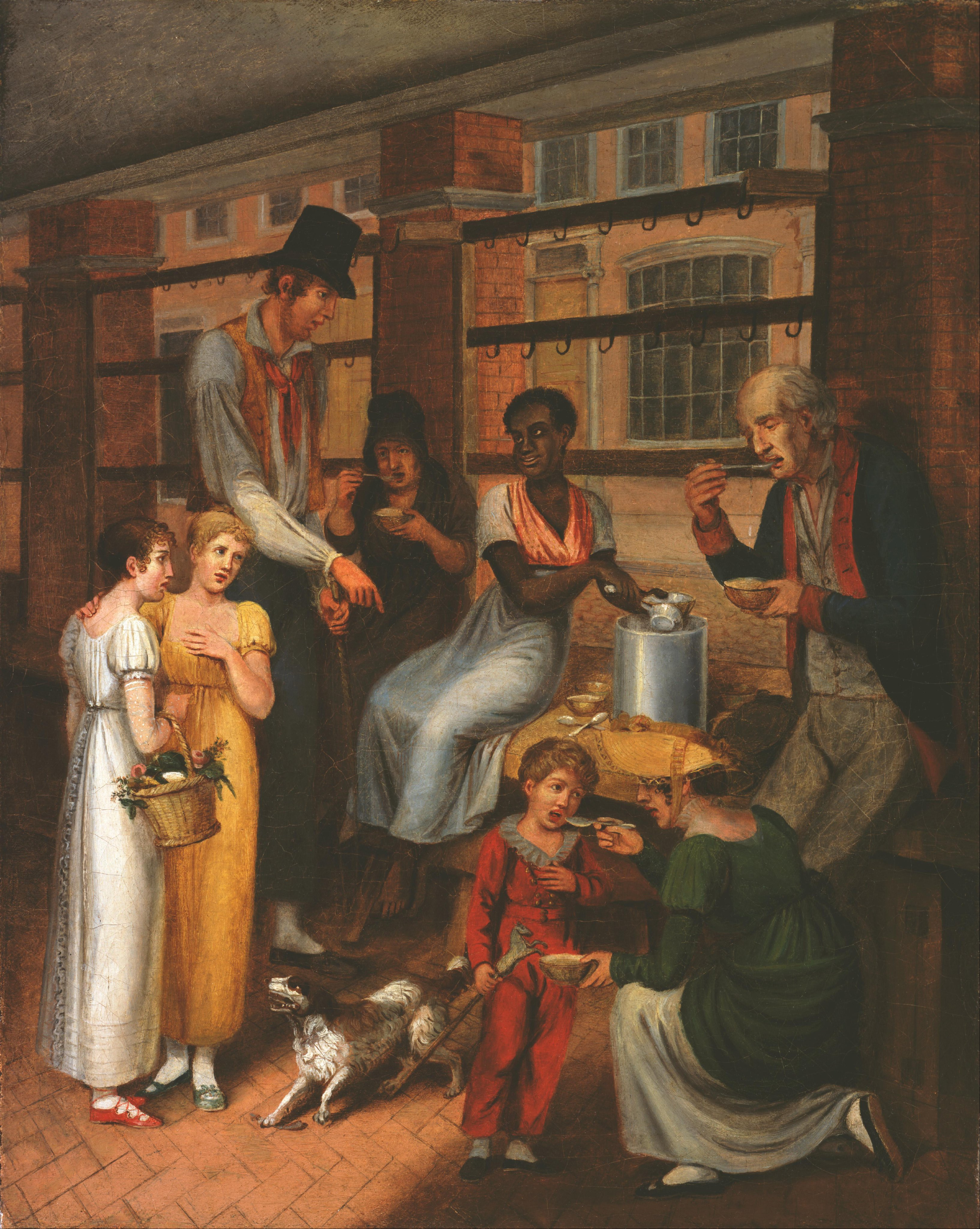
- Artist: John Lewis Krimmel
- Year: 1811
- Medium: Oil on canvas
- Movement: Genre painting
- Dimensions: 49.5 cm × 39.4 cm (19.5 in × 15.5 in)
- Location: Philadelphia Museum of Art

Pepper-Pot: A Scene in the Philadelphia Market is an oil-on-canvas genre painting by American artist John Lewis Krimmel (1786–1821). It was painted in Philadelphia in 1811. Gifted by Edward Barnes Leisenring Jr. in 2001, the work is held in the collection of the Philadelphia Museum of Art. The painting depicts a free Black woman, a street vendor, ladling out pepper pot soup, a Philadelphia staple, to hungry customers.

Pepper-Pot was one of the first paintings to depict an African American worker in Philadelphia, while Krimmel was the first Philadelphia artist to feature street scenes in his artwork. The strikingly diverse races, ages, and social classes depicted in the painting contribute to making it a notable work of early American art.

The painting features as the cover photo of the 2026 book Pepperpot City by William Woys Weaver.
