= John Lewis Krimmel =

American genre painter (1786–1821)

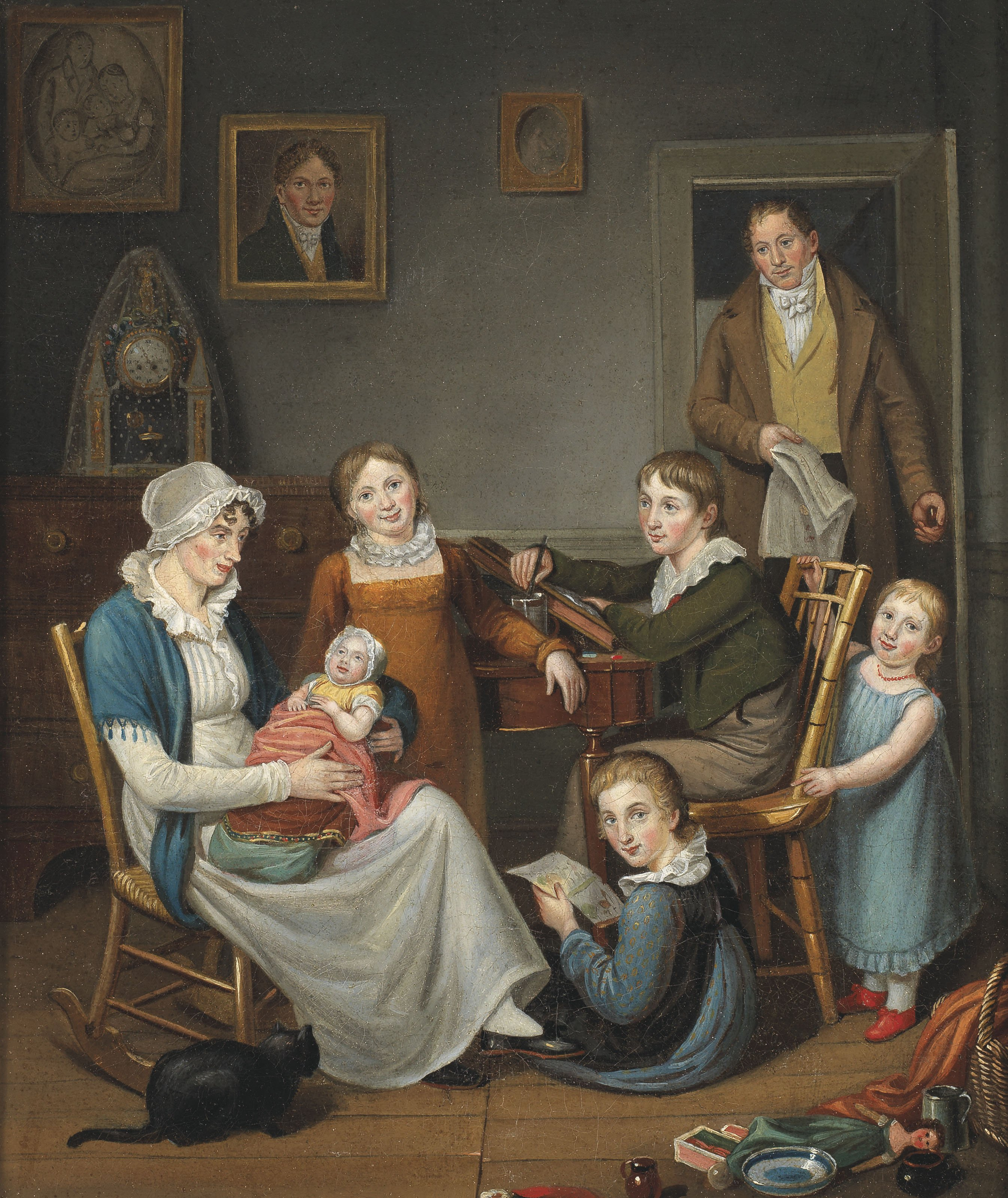
- Self-Portrait with Susanna Krimmel and her Children by John Lewis Krimmel
- Born: Johann Ludwig Krimmel; May 30, 1786; Württemberg, Germany
- Died: July 15, 1821 (aged 35); Germantown, Pennsylvania, U.S.
- Known for: Painting
- Movement: Genre painting

John Lewis Krimmel (May 30, 1786 – July 15, 1821), sometimes called "the American Hogarth," was North America's first painter of genre scenes. Born in the Holy Roman Empire, he immigrated to Philadelphia in 1809 and soon became a member of the Pennsylvania Academy of the Fine Arts. Initially influenced by Scotland's David Wilkie, England's William Hogarth, and America's Benjamin West, he soon turned to direct observation of life for his genre scenes.

Krimmel was among the first artists in America to portray free African Americans, such as in Black People's Prayer Meeting (1813). Paintings such as Fourth of July Celebration in Centre Square (1811/12) and Election Day (1815) are filled with lively characterizations of scores of crowd members. American artists influenced by Krimmel's work include William Sidney Mount, George Caleb Bingham, and Thomas Eakins.

== Early life and education ==
Krimmel was born on May 30, 1786, in the small town of Ebingen in Duchy of Württemberg in Germany.

In 1809, Johann Ludwig decided to join his older brother, who had immigrated to Philadelphia. He initially planned to engage in business with his brother, but soon abandoned this occupation for art. Though he may have had some watercolor lessons in London, Johann Ludwig had no real formal training in art when he reached Philadelphia about November 1, 1809. The 1812 city directory listed Krimmel, who Anglicized his name to John Lewis, as a painter. He began painting portraits. But a copy of David Wilkie's Blind Fiddler persuaded him to turn to humorous subjects. He also painted historical pictures.

== Career ==
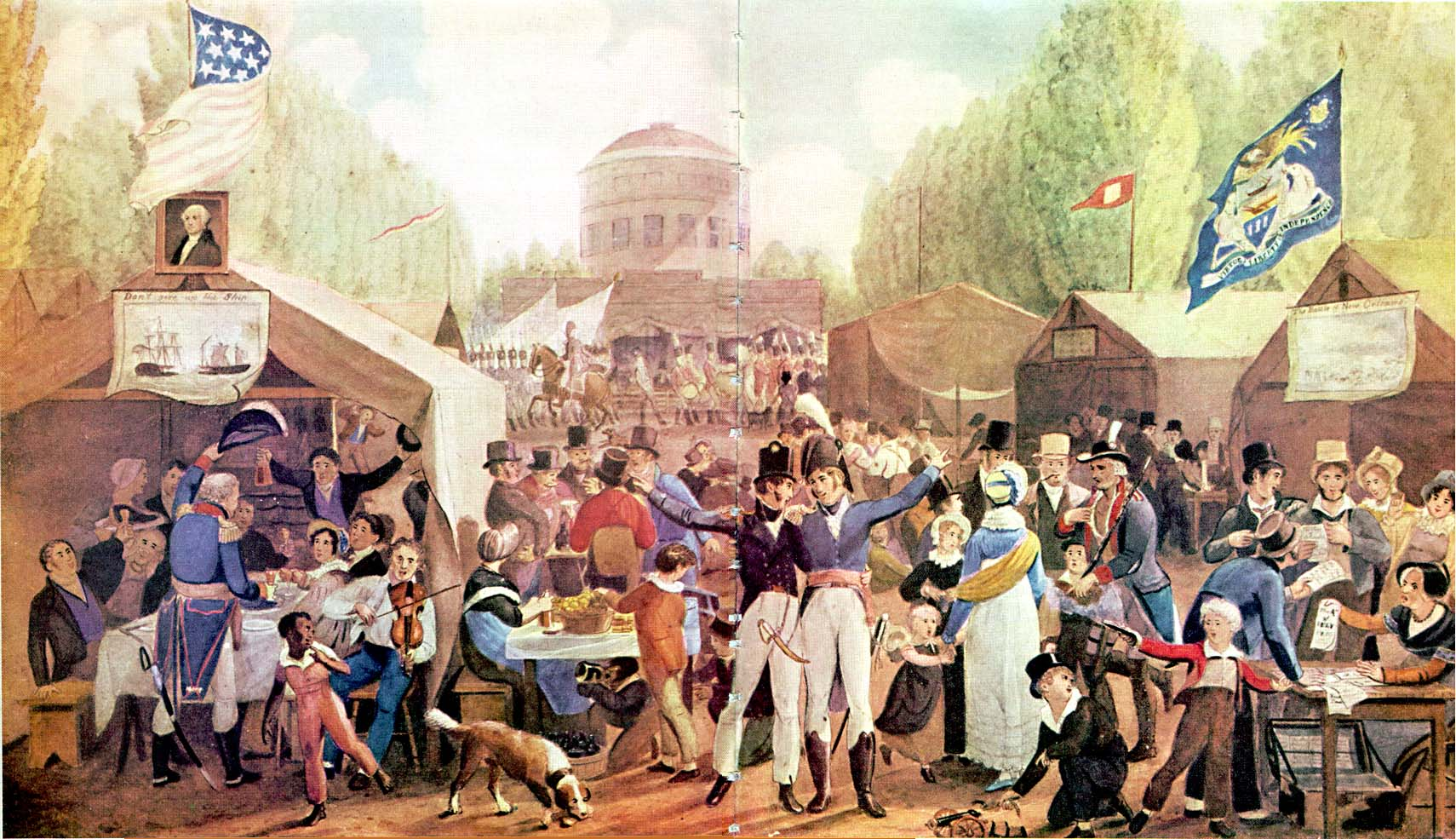
Fourth of July Celebration in Centre Square, Philadelphia (1819 painting)

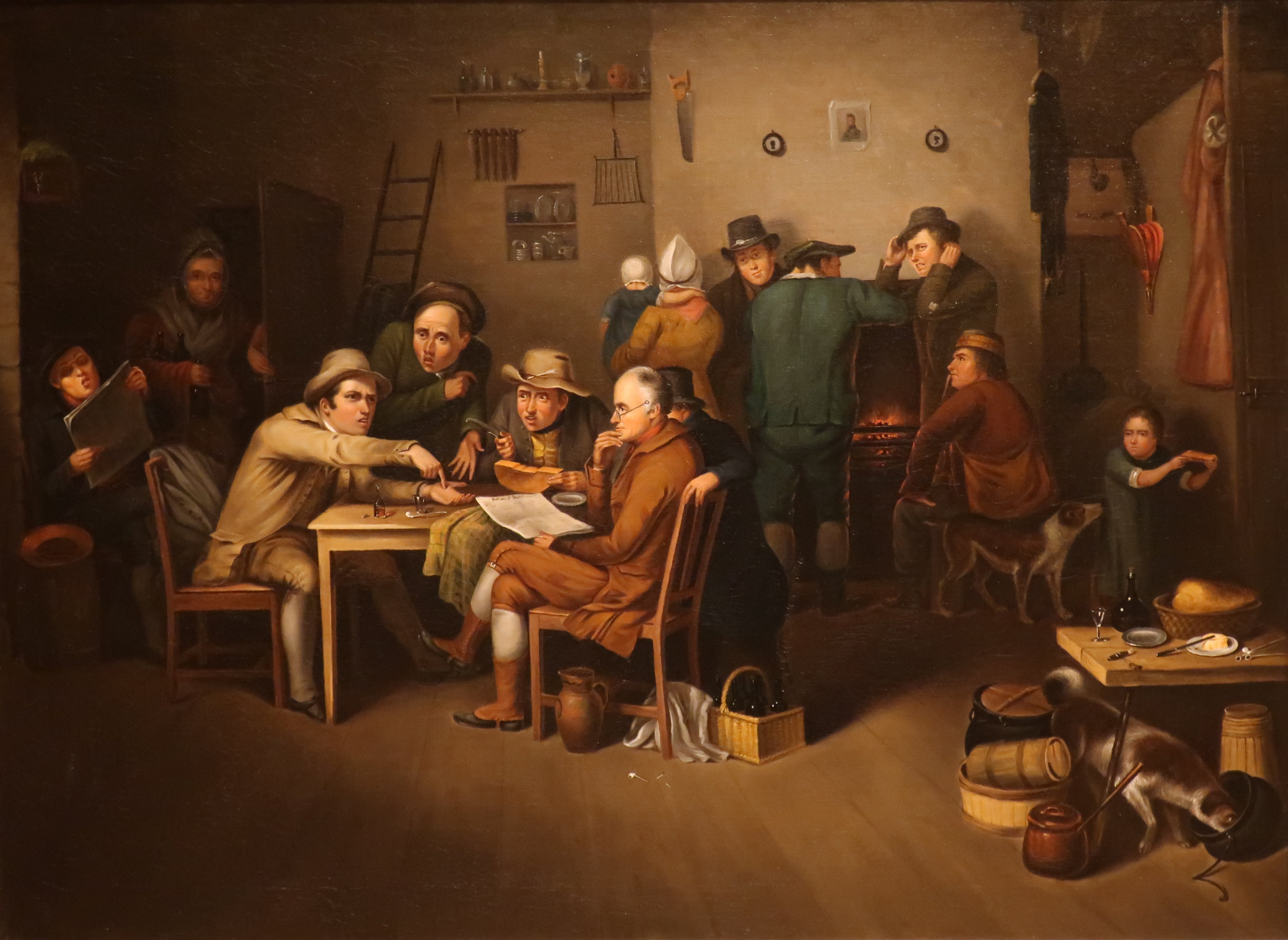
The Village Politicians, c. 1819

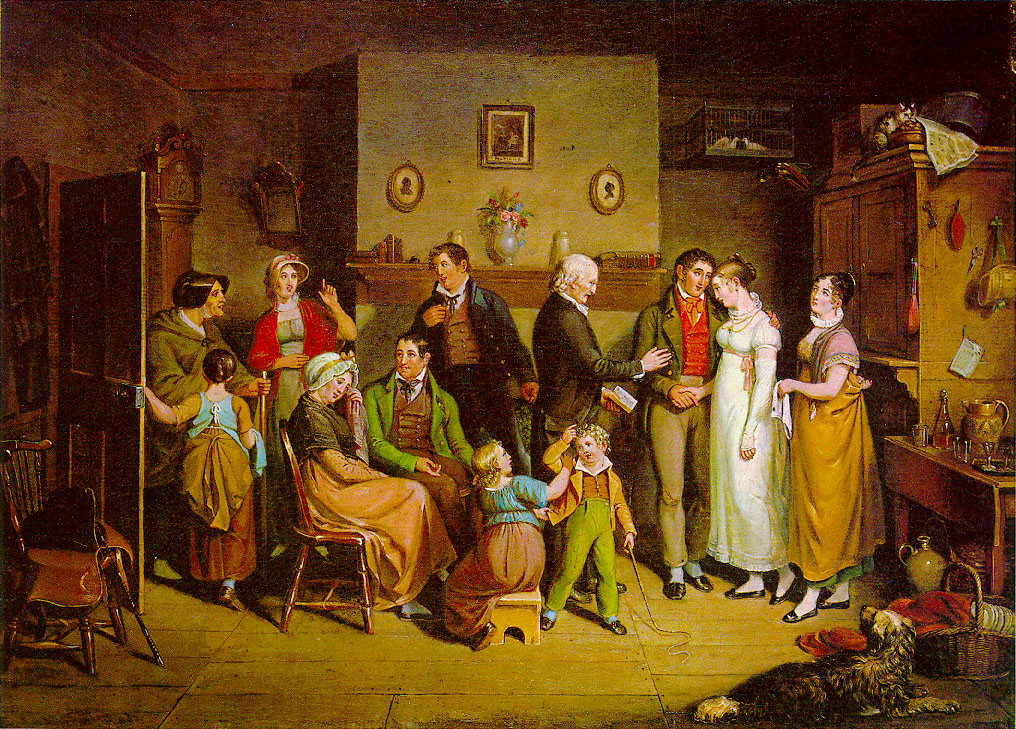
Country Wedding, an 1820 portrait

Krimmel arrived in Philadelphia, then the intellectual and cultural center of the United States. In Philadelphia, Krimmel soon joined the first known sketch club in America whose members included Thomas Sully and Rembrandt Peale. His first painting to excite public notice was Pepper-Pot: A Scene in the Philadelphia Market (1811). The oil depicted a black woman ladling out bowls of her uniquely Philadelphian spicy soup to white customers of various ages and social classes. This genre scene or depiction of contemporary everyday life was soon followed by many more in his sketchbooks and canvases like Blind Man's Buff (1814) and Country Wedding (1814). In all of his known oils, Krimmel included at least one animal (usually a frisky dog), sometimes two or three.

Pavel Svinyin, a Russian on a diplomatic mission to Philadelphia between 1811 and 1813, apparently purchased roughly 14 sketches from Krimmel and presented them back in Russia along with works from a variety of sources as typical American scenes which he had painted himself. The works in the so-called Svinin Portfolio include Black People's Prayer Meeting, Deck Life on One of Fulton's Steamboats, and Morning in Front of Arch Street Meeting House, which showed Quakers in their Sunday best. The Svinin Portfolio is now in the Metropolitan Museum of Art in New York. Formerly thought to be Svinin's own work, the watercolors are now generally attributed to Krimmel.

Krimmel's works are often reproduced in schoolbooks, historical works and magazines. Election Day in Philadelphia, perhaps his most famous painting, painted in 1815, illustrates his ability to individualize crowd members with humorous observations. Fourth of July Celebration in Centre Square, Philadelphia, 1819 brims with patriotism and a spirit of unity in a neoclassical design. In Quilting Frolic, guests accompanied by a Black fiddler burst in to celebrate the finishing of a quilt before the needlework and clean-up of the room are quite finished. Art historian Guy McElroy has identified this work as one of the first "to utilize physiognomical distortions [wide toothy grins and over-sized lips] as a basic element in the depiction of African Americans..." Krimmel's depiction of a mother and daughter trying to persuade the drunken father to come home made Village Tavern the first American painting to illustrate the social ills addressed by the temperance movement.

Krimmel recorded ideas for his pictures in a series of sketchbooks he kept between 1810 and 1821. From late 1816 to 1818, he travelled back to his home region as well as to Vienna and Salzburg, and his sketchbooks are filled with sketches of European landscapes, people, animals, and flowers. His encounters with local artists influenced his style to become more maturely romantic. Some of Krimmel's now lost paintings are known from detailed sketches, such as The Tea Party. Seven of Krimmel's sketchbooks are now in the library at the Winterthur Museum, Garden and Library. They contain approximately 700 separate drawings, ranging from quick pencil sketches to finished watercolor pictures, which have been useful in authenticating unsigned paintings of Krimmel that surface from time to time.

Two sketches in his second sketchbook capture a typical Moravian Christmas home celebration and represent what are probably the earliest depictions of a Christmas tree in American art.

== Death ==
On July 15, 1821, Krimmel went swimming near Germantown in a millpond and drowned. He was engaged to be married at the time of his death.

== Legacy ==
Although Krimmel had been a painter only eleven years, his star was on the rise. He had recently been elected President of Association of American Artists. He had also received a prestigious commission for a large historical work, a 6x9-foot canvas commemorating the landing of William Penn at New Castle, Delaware in October 1682. While Krimmel's genre scenes found few buyers during his lifetime, engravings of his work made long after his death were widely circulated as prints and magazine illustrations.

He is recognized as the most significant American painter to consistently chronicle American life from 1810 to 1821.

In the 2010s and 2020s, a cropped version of "The Village Politicians" became a popular Internet meme.

=== Watercolor pictures ===
Krimmel watercolor paintings on display at the Metropolitan Museum of Art in New York City:

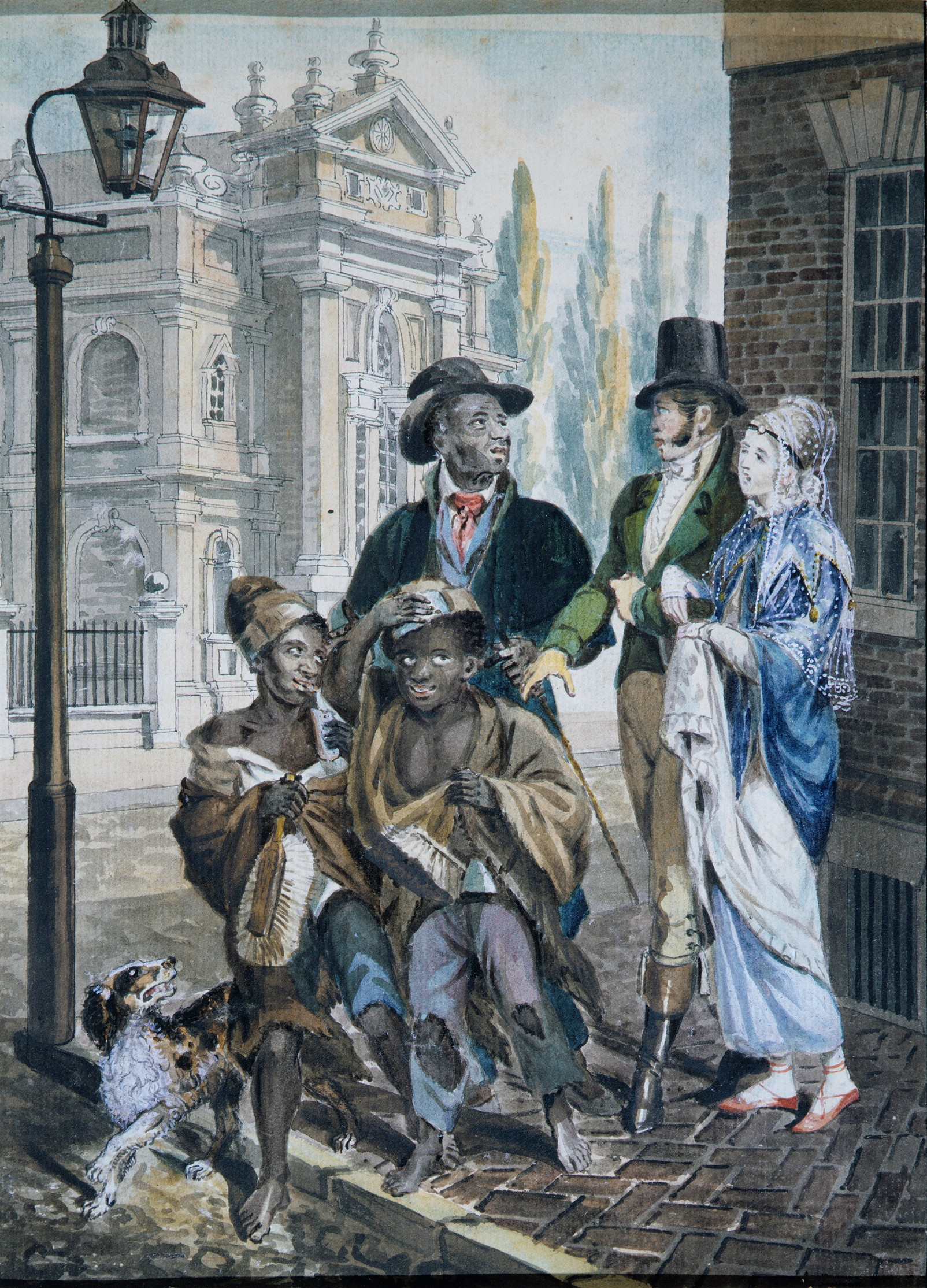
"Worldly Folk" Questioning Chimney Sweeps and Their Master before Christ Church in Philadelphia

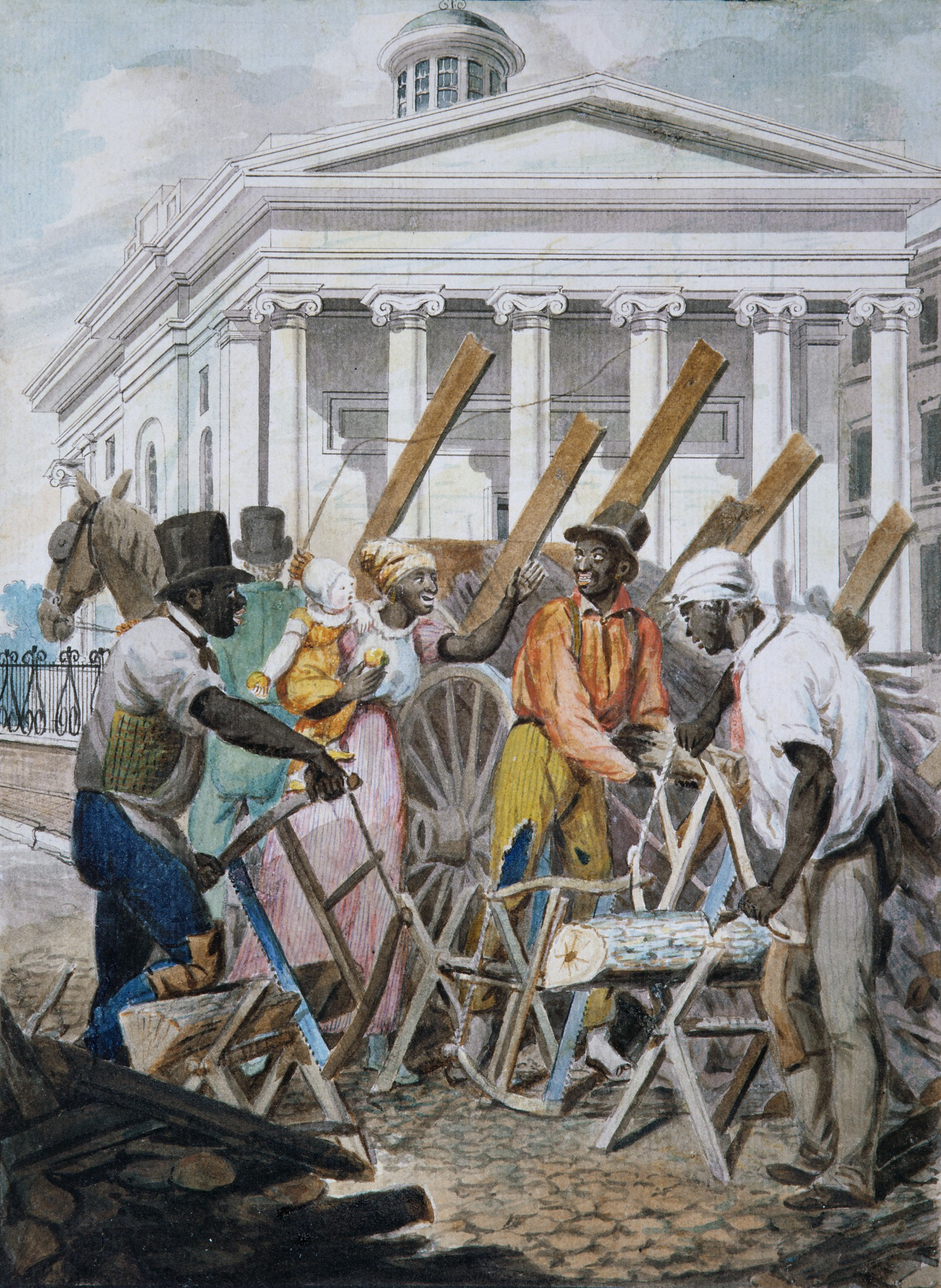
Black Sawyers Working in front of the Bank of Pennsylvania in Philadelphia

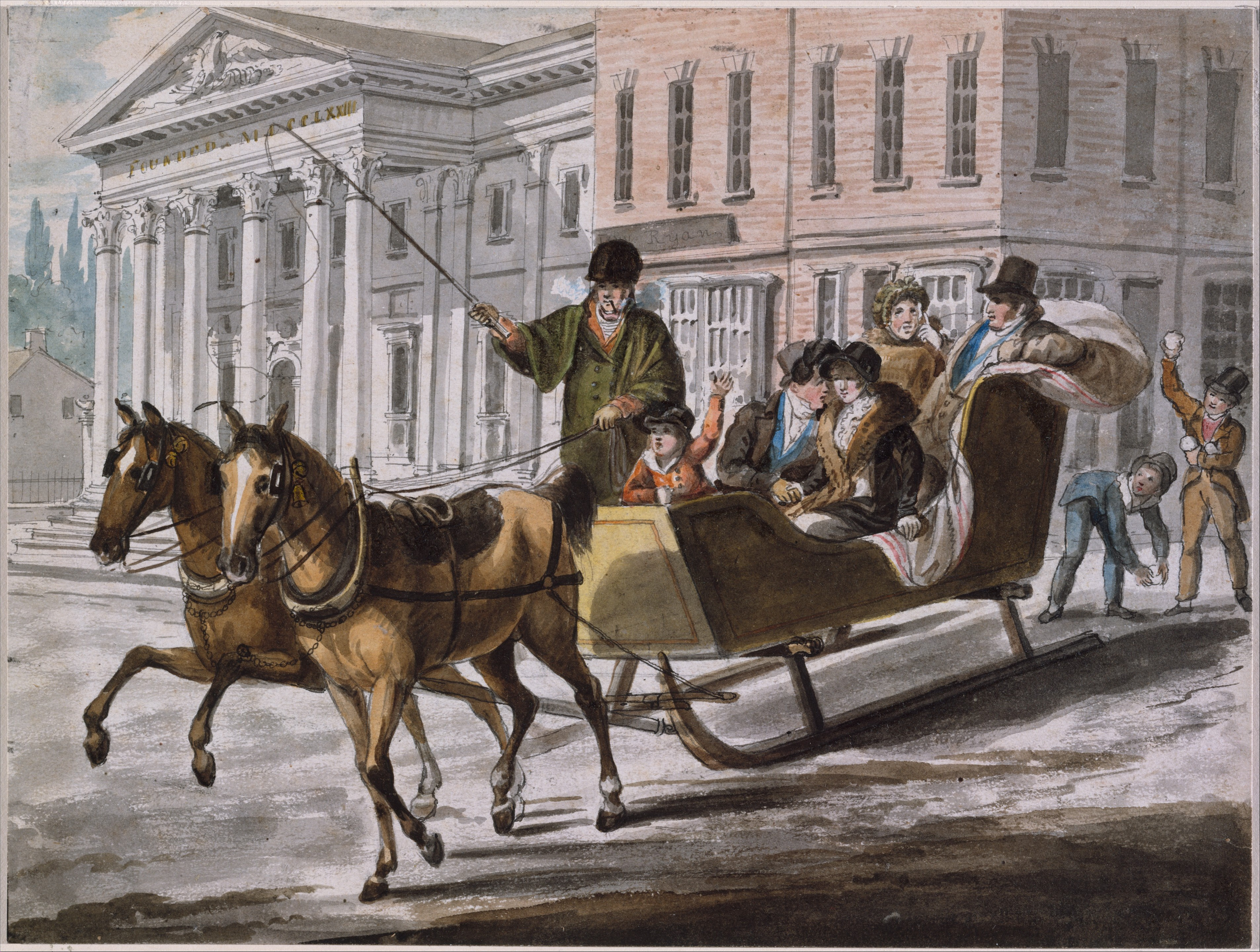
Winter Scene in Philadelphia—The Bank of the United States in the Background

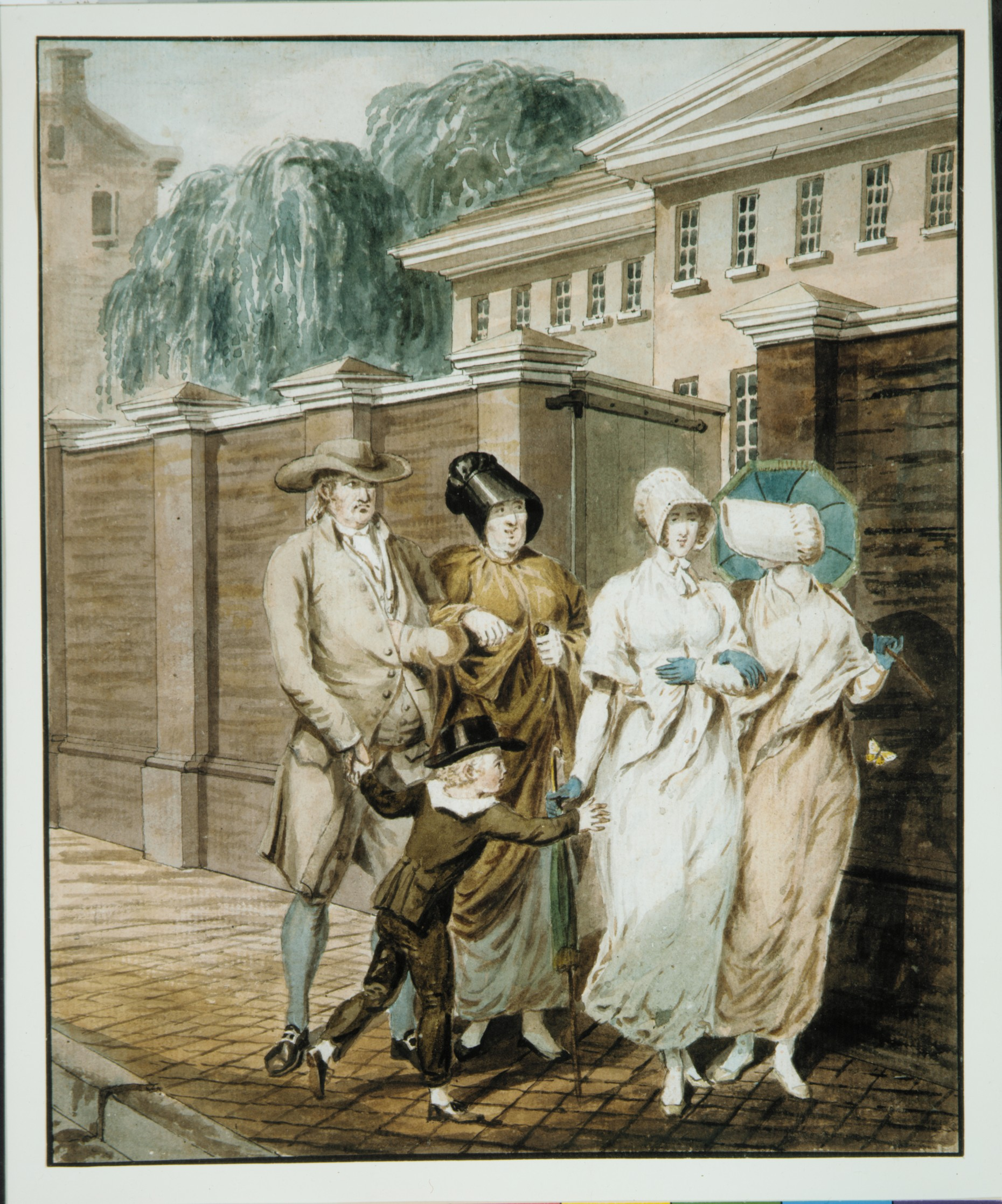
Sunday Morning in front of the Arch Street Meeting House in Philadelphia

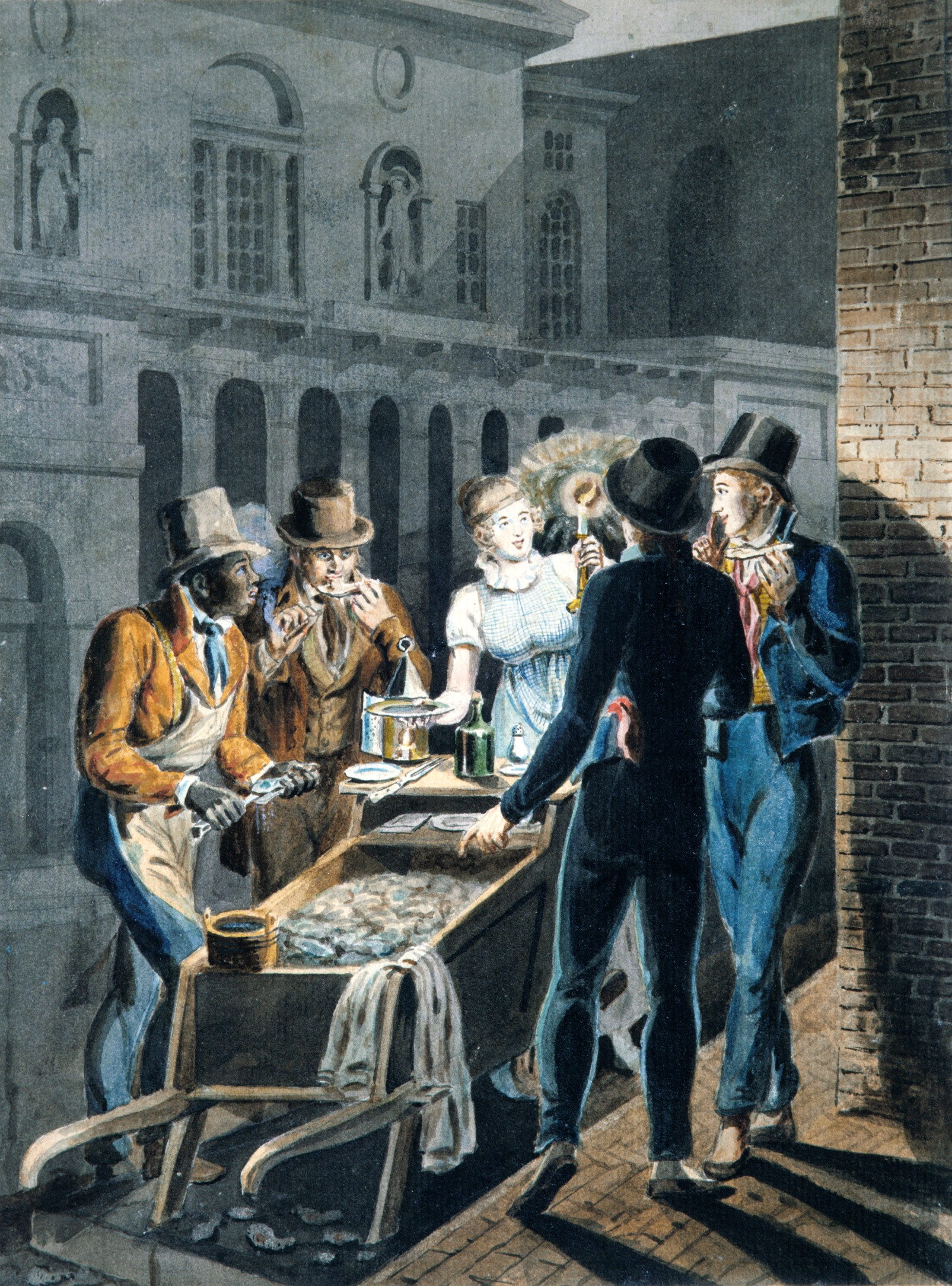
Nightlife in Philadelphia—an Oyster Barrow in front of the Chestnut Street Theater

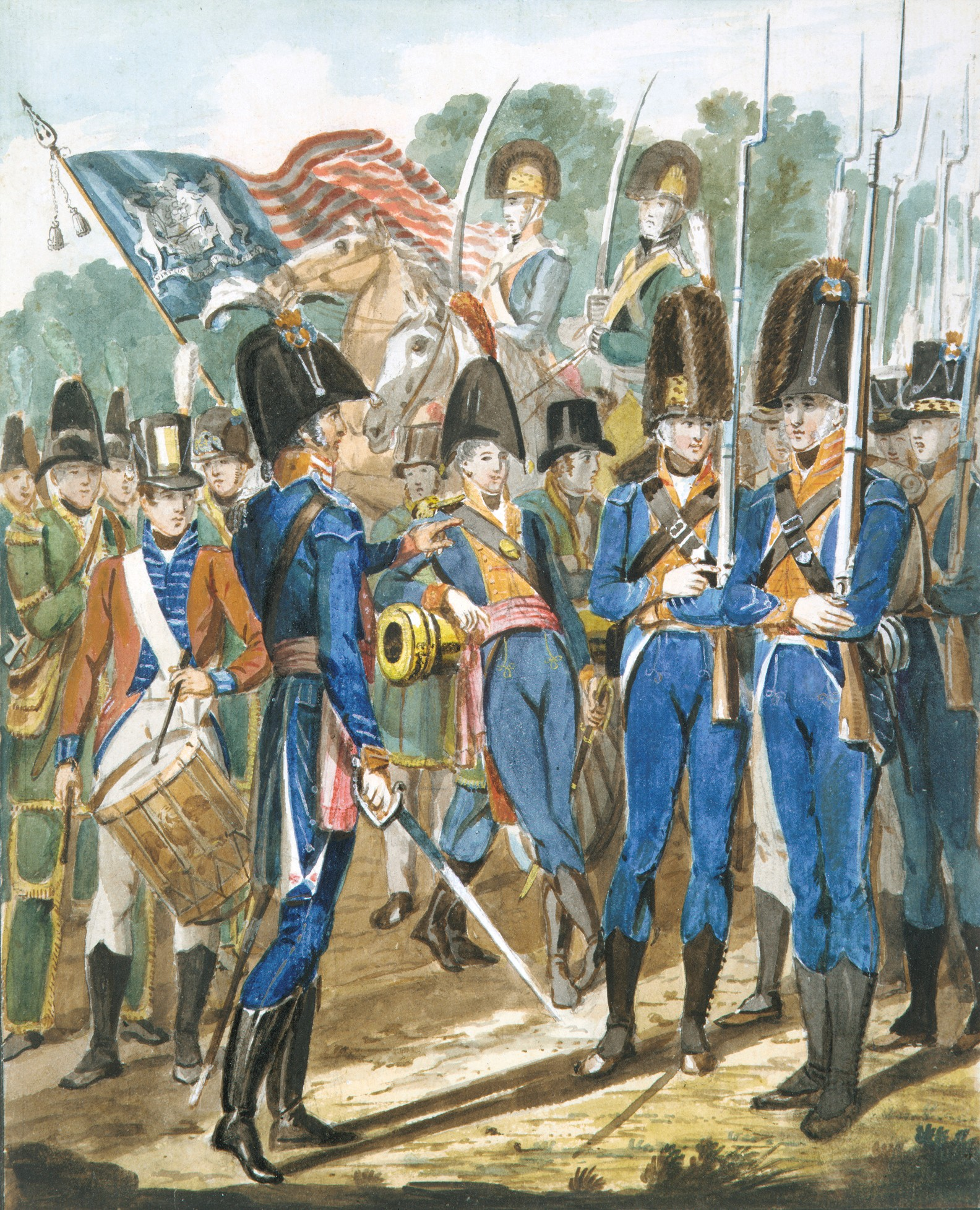
Members of the City Troop and Other Philadelphia Soldiery

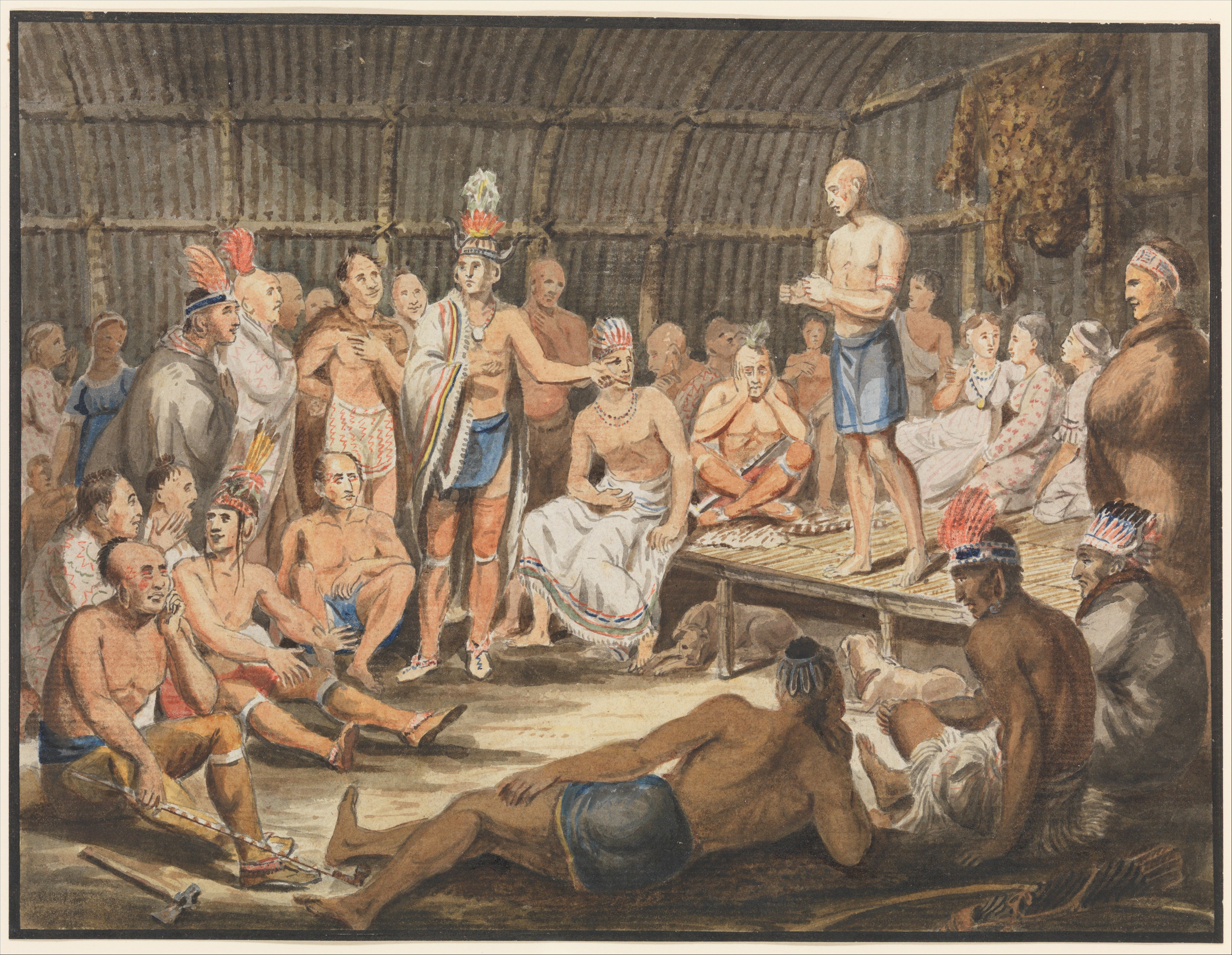
Exhibition of Indian Tribal Ceremonies at the Olympic Theater in Philadelphia

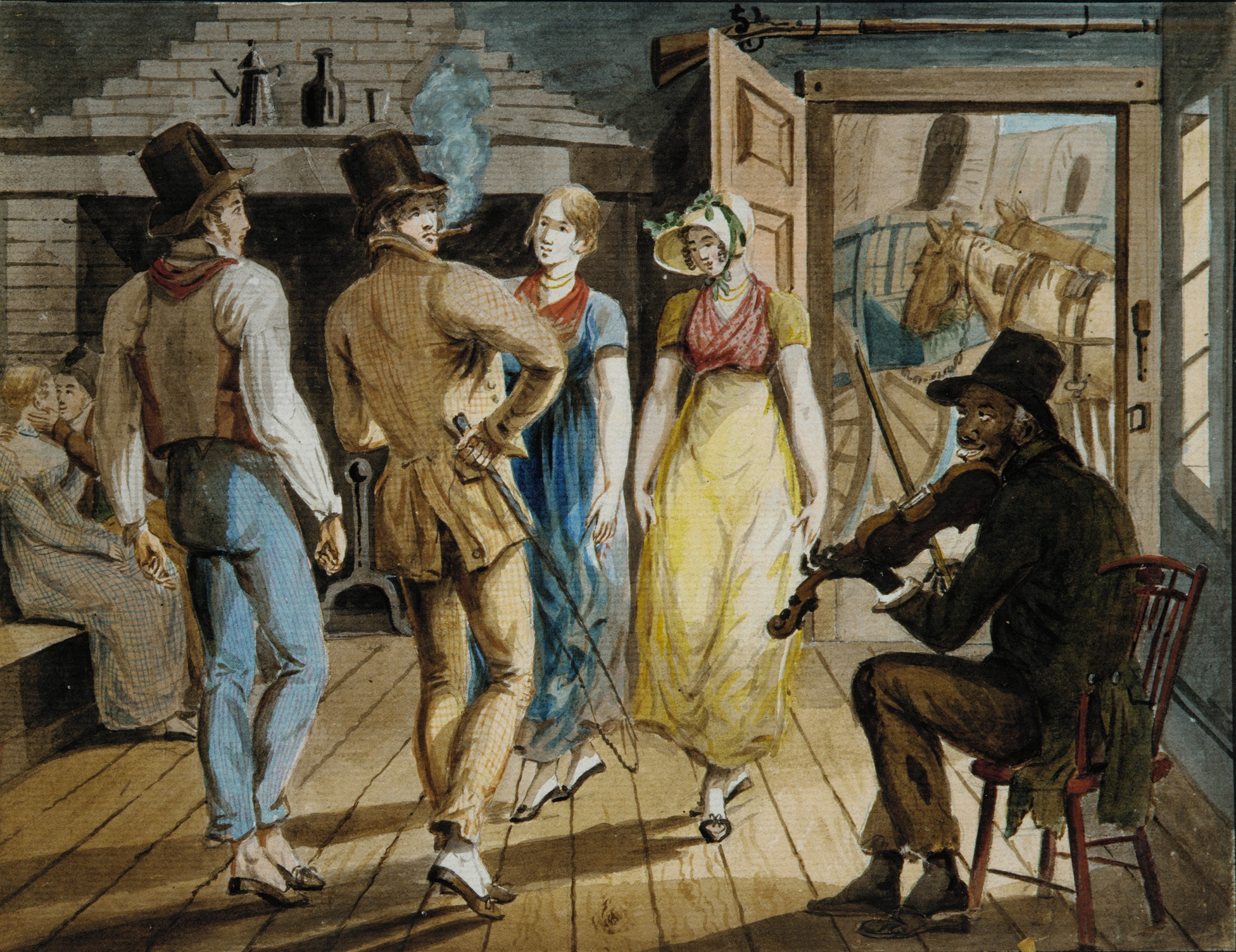
Merrymaking at a Wayside Inn

== Selected works ==
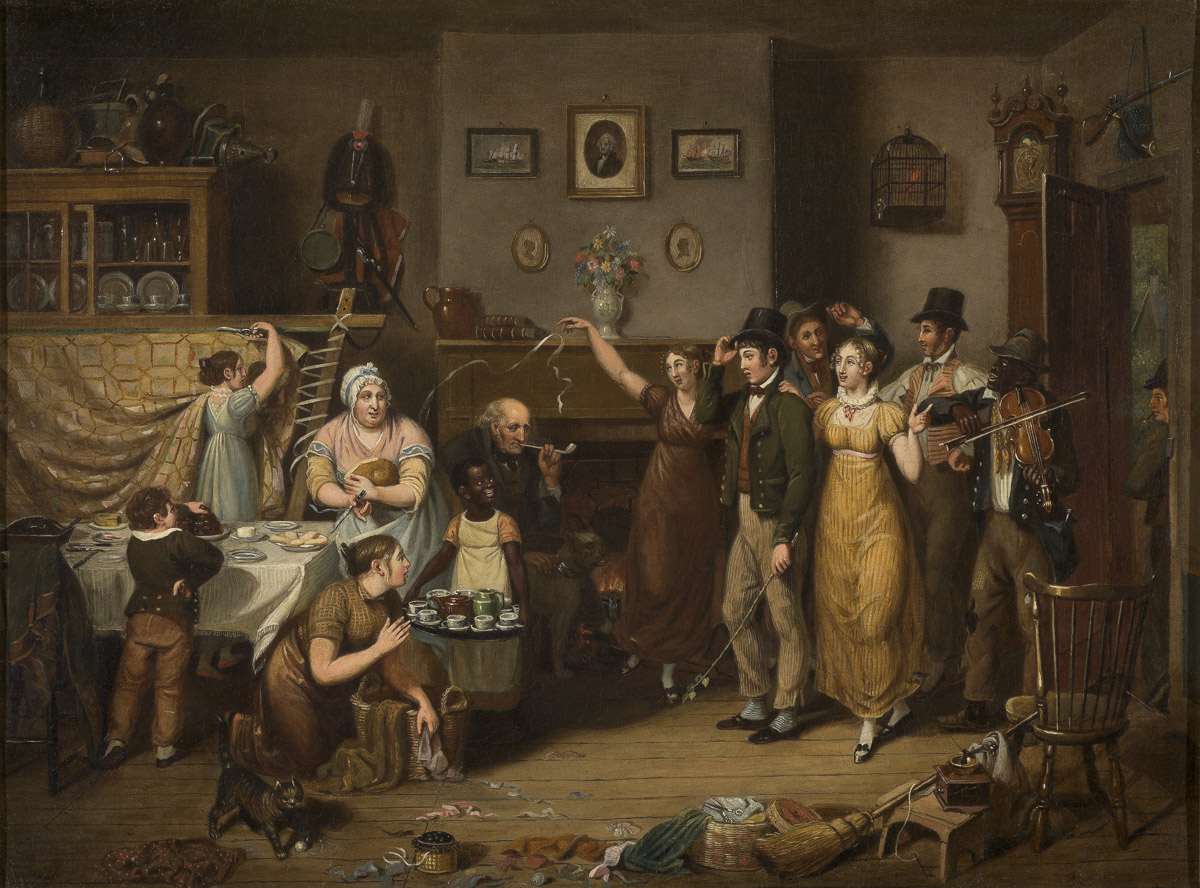
Quilting Frolic, 1813

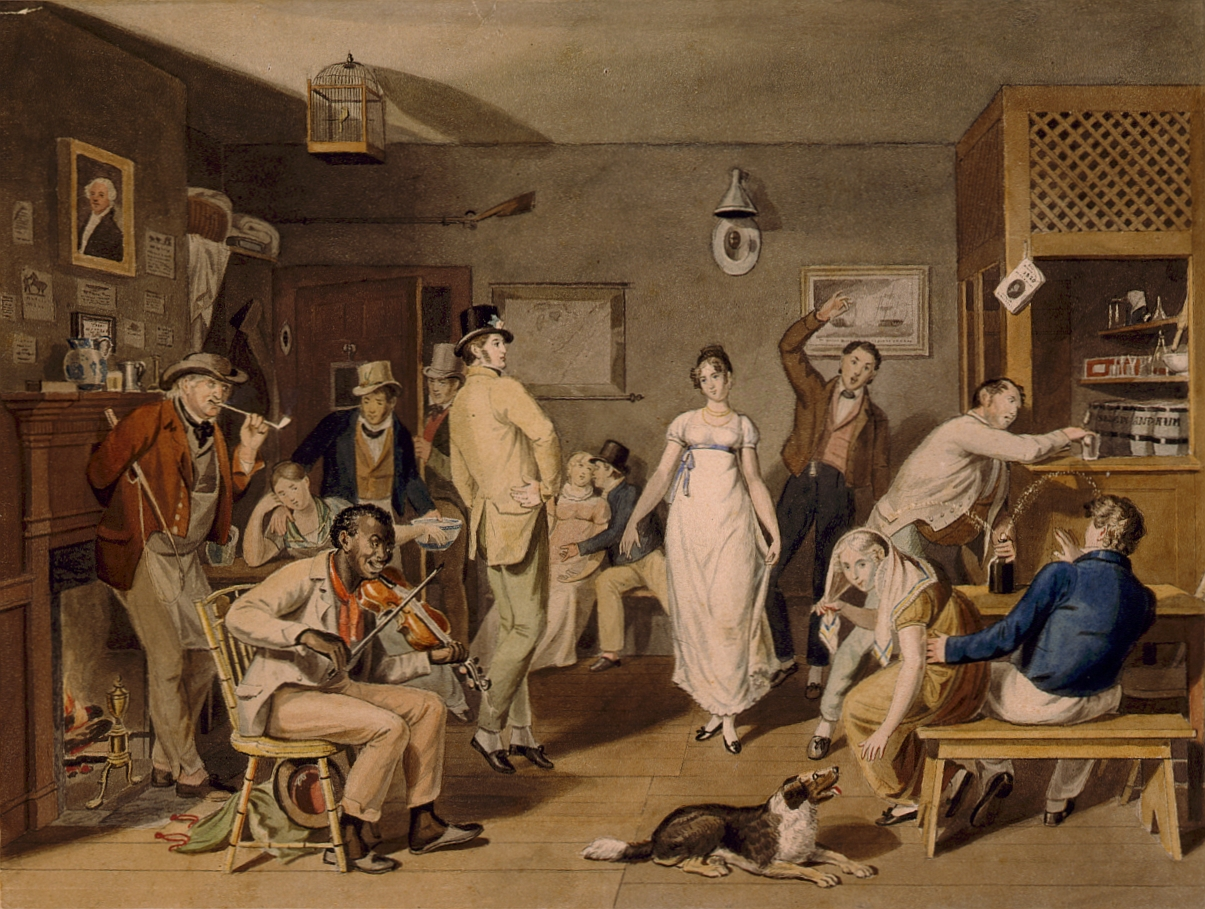
Barroom Dancing, c. 1820

- Pepper-Pot: A Scene in the Philadelphia Market, 1811
- Fourth of July Celebration in Centre Square, 1812
- Quilting Frolic, 1813
- In an American Pie, 1814
- The Country Wedding, 1814
- Election Day in Philadelphia, 1815
- Fourth of July Drunk Celebration 1819 - Philadelphia
- The Cut P.P.
- Blindman's B.J.
- Going to and Returning from Boarding-School
- Perry's Victory
