= Guyanese pepperpot =

Dish of stewed meat and spices

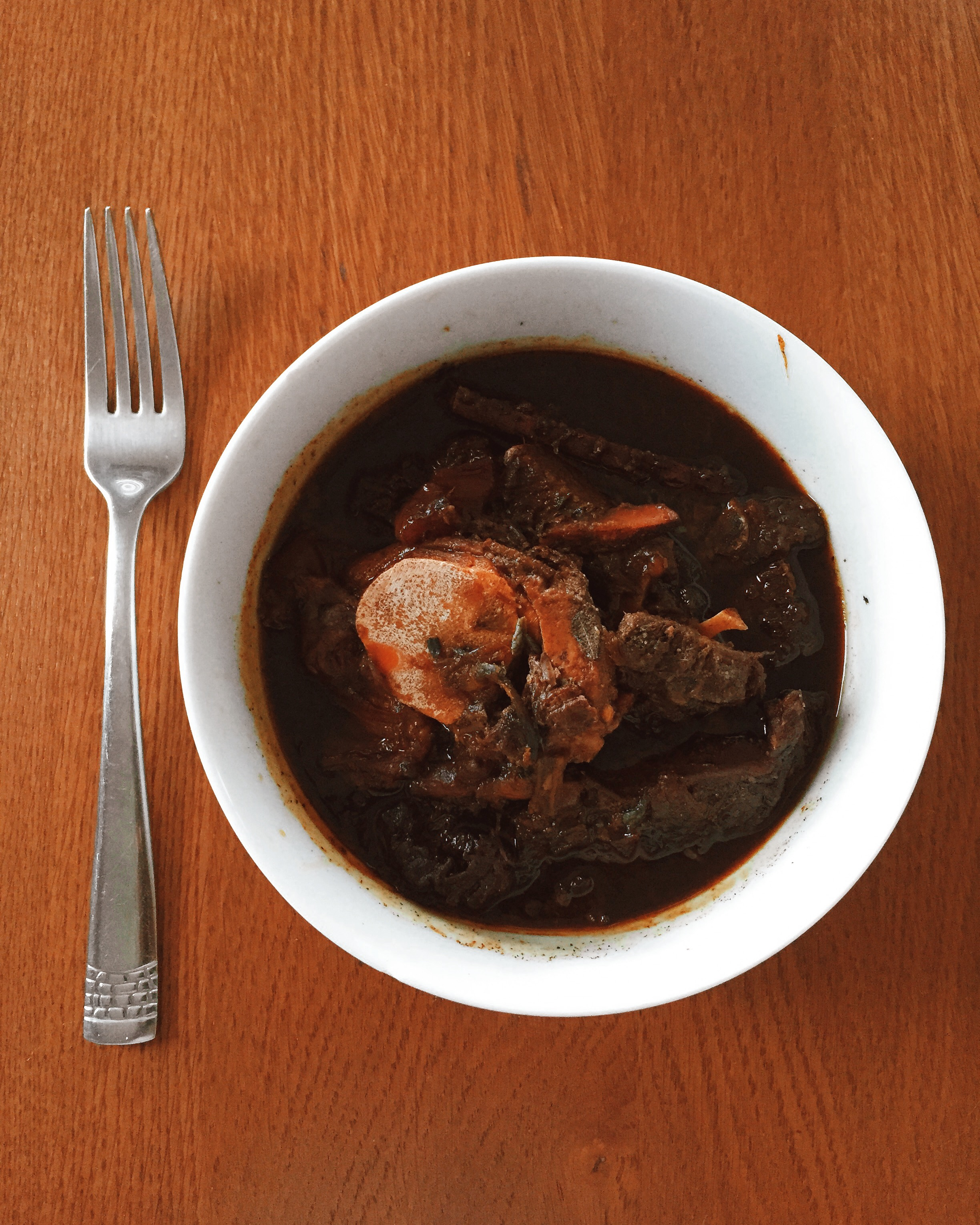
- Type: Stew
- Place of origin: Guyana
- Main ingredients: Meat (beef, pork, mutton), cinnamon, hot peppers, cassareep

Guyanese pepperpot is the Guyanese variation of pepperpot, a slow-cooked stew found in several parts of the Caribbean and mainland Americas.. It is traditionally served at Christmas and other special events. Along with chicken curry, and cook-up rice, pepperpot is one of Guyana's national dishes.

This dish is usually reserved for special occasions because it needs to cook for several hours, and mostly eaten on Christmas Day or during the Christmas holiday season, and sometimes on Boxing Day. Like the original Amerindian version it is usually made in a large pot and can be reheated and eaten over several days because the cassareep starts preserving the meat.

Traditionally, the dish is made using wiri wiri chilli peppers (a Capsicum frutescens cultivar native to Guyana) but due to low availability outside of the country, Scotch bonnet or habanero peppers are commonly accepted substitutes due to their similar spice level and fruitiness.

== See also ==
- Jamaican pepperpot soup
- Guyanese cuisine
- List of meat dishes
- List of stews
- Philadelphia Pepper Pot
