= Conservation and restoration of quilts =

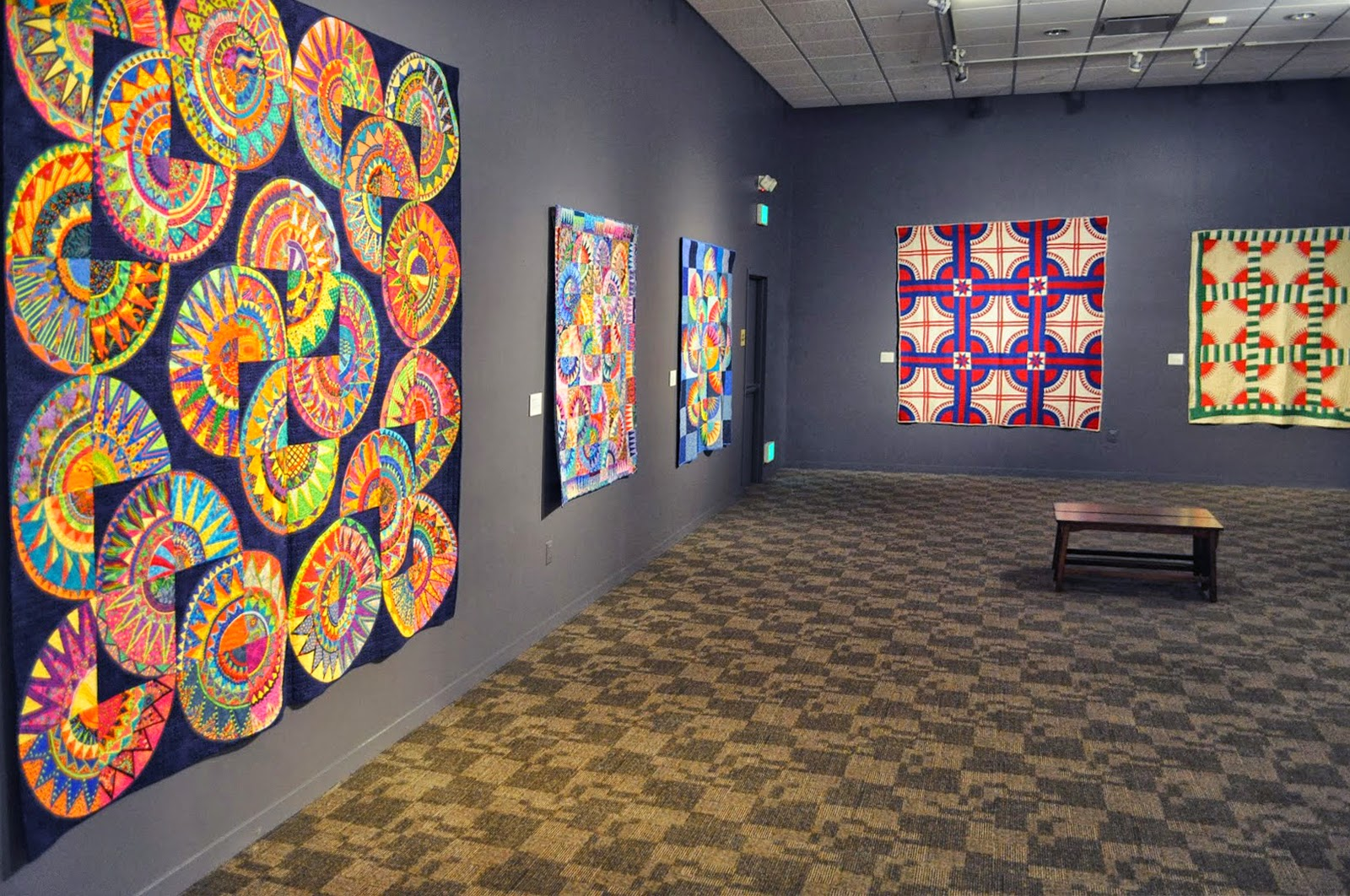
San Jose Museum of Quilts & Textiles

The conservation and restoration of quilts refers to the processes involved in maintaining the integrity of quilts and/or restoring them to an acceptable standard so that they may be preserved for future generations. Quilts have been produced for centuries, as utilitarian blankets, decorations, family heirlooms, and now treasured museum collections objects. Quilts are three-layered textile pieces with a decorated top, a back, and a filler in the middle. The composite nature of these objects creates an interesting challenge for their conservation, as the separate layers can be made of different textile materials, multiple colors, and therefore, varying degrees of wear, tear, and damage.

== What is a Quilt? ==
A quilt is a multi-layered textile, traditionally composed of three layers of fiber: a woven cloth top, a layer of batting or wadding, and a woven back, combined using the technique of quilting, the process of sewing the three layers together.

The pattern of stitching can be the key decorative element if a single piece of fabric is used for the top of a quilt (a "wholecloth quilt"), but in many cases the top is pieced from a patchwork of smaller fabric pieces; and the pattern and color of these pieces will be important to the design. Patterns, fabric, and styles differ greatly based on the time period and area that they were produced in. The quilts produced in Gee's Bend, Alabama are great examples of the history and use of quilts in specific space and time.

Quilting is the process of sewing two or more layers of fabric together to make a thicker padded material, usually to create a quilt or quilted garment. The process of quilting uses a needle and thread to join two or more layers of material to make a quilt. The quilter's hand or sewing machine passes the needle and thread through all layers and then brings the needle back up. The process is repeated across the entire area where quilting is wanted.

== History ==
=== Composition ===
Quilting, sewing together layers of fabric to create a cohesive whole, has been around for hundreds, perhaps thousands of years. Europe, Russia, the United Kingdom, and the United States all have examples of quilts that are hundreds of years old. Depending on the time period and area that they were produced in, quilts can be made of varying textiles, have a myriad of different colors, and be pieced together using different methods. Some quilts produced in the Civil War era were created using silk ribbons. Silk material such as these ribbons often suffer from what is referred to as "shattering," caused by metal salts that were applied to silk fabrics to create desired "rustles" in women's dresses, and were used as a weighting agent in these dresses. The metal components do considerable damage to silk fabric over time. Quilts containing metal salts formed a minority of these objects, however, they provide an example of the types of features to be identified when considering treatment. The Minnesota Historical Society has some guidelines for preserving quilts that include insights such as looking for deterioration issues due to certain fabric types such as silk as well as specific dyes. In the twenty-first century, quilts are frequently displayed as non-utilitarian works of art, but historically quilts were often used as bed covers. The use of quilts as bedcovers persists today.

=== Processes/Techniques ===
After their creation, the use and production style of quilts varied; initially a utilitarian product used mostly for bed coverings, quilts have evolved to become decorative pieces as well. Due to the changing uses of these items, techniques for creating them have evolved over the last few centuries. Some common historical and current quilting techniques include the following:

- Patchwork & Piecing
  - One of the primary techniques involved in quilt making is patchwork, sewing together geometric pieces of fabric often to form a design or "block." Also called piecing, this technique can be achieved with hand stitching or with a sewing machine.
- Applique
  - Appliqué is a sewing technique where an upper layer of fabric is sewn onto a ground fabric.
- Reverse Applique
  - Reverse appliqué is a sewing technique where a ground fabric is cut, another piece of fabric is placed under the ground fabric, the raw edges of the ground fabric are tucked under, and the newly folded edge is sewn down to the lower fabric. Stitches are made as inconspicuous as possible.
- Quilting
  - Quilting, typically a running stitch, can be achieved by hand or by sewing machine. Hand quilting has often been a communally productive act with quilters sitting around a large quilting frame.
- Trapunto
  - Trapunto is a sewing technique where two layers of fabric surrounding a layer of batting are quilted together, and then additional material is added to a portion of the design to increase the profile of relief as compared to the rest of the work.
- Embellishment
  - Additional decorative elements may be added to the surface of a quilt to create a three-dimensional or whimsical effect. The most common objects sewn on are beads or buttons. Decorative trim, piping, sequins, found objects, or other items can also be secured to the surface.
- English Paper Piecing
  - English paper piecing is a hand-sewing technique used to maximize accuracy when piecing complex angles together. A paper shape is cut with the exact dimensions of the desired piece. Fabric is then basted to the paper shape. Adjacent units are then placed face to face, and the seam is whipstitched together. When a given piece is completely surrounded by all the adjacent shapes, the basting thread is cut, and the basting and the paper shape are removed.
- Foundation Piecing
  - Foundation piecing is a sewing technique that allows maximum stability of the work as the piecing is created, minimizing the distorting effect of working with slender pieces or bias-cut pieces.

== Conservation and Restoration Science ==
The conservation and use of all materials in a museum should be balanced to suit the object and the public. Best practices for the conservation/restoration of items start with the identification of the materials the item is constructed of. This identification allows conservation scientists to effectively treat and preserve the items for future generations. Though referred to my many names, (i.e. conservation scientists, cultural heritage scientists, etc.) these museum professionals have very specific skill sets using knowledge in physical science, forensics, the humanities, engineering, computer science, and economics. Conservation scientists use the skills they developed in these fields to conserve/restore objects from a wide array of museum areas including; statues, historical sites, paper, and textiles. As a composite textile, quilts require special consideration. The environment that they are stored in is one basic factor to consider. Being a single piece composed of possibly multiple different fabrics; all of the different fabrics' compositions need to be considered for conservation, storage, display, and treatment purposes. The large size of quilts requires special attention as well, specifically during handling, storage, and display. Due to the fragile nature of textiles, trained professionals are often the best choice to decide on the necessity of repairs and to perform them.

== Agents of Deterioration ==
For the most part, all objects are susceptible to forces (agents of deterioration) that cause them to decay over the course of time through chemical, physical, biological deterioration, or some combination of the three. As with most of these objects, preventive conservation is one of the cornerstones to maintaining quilts for future generations. Through understanding the different agents of deterioration and examining the greatest threat to the objects, the museum can develop a plan to mitigate these risks. As a composite textile often containing different colors, quilts are vulnerable to light. Overexposure to light can change the colors and strength of the fabrics within them. Light is not the only agent that affects textiles such as quilts; composed of organic materials, they contain carbon, are susceptible to temperature and relative humidity levels, may absorb water, and can even become homes for mold and sources of food for pests. Quilts, and textiles in general, can be sensitive to chemicals, dust, dirt, oils, smoke, stains, perfume, and even excessive washing. Susceptible to all of these agents, quilts can undergo changes that may cause discernible damage. According to the National Park Service Museum Handbook, 2012, "chemical changes in textiles caused by interaction with light also weaken the fabric so that physical damage such as rips and tears are more likely to occur." To create more habitable environments for quilts, conservators can cycle each specimen in and out of lighted areas and storage, monitor RH and temperature levels, seal them in individual cases created for them, and more. Preventive conservation is an extremely important tool in the conservators handbook, giving them agency beyond restoration and ideally giving them more control over the natural process of deterioration that is impossible to halt completely.

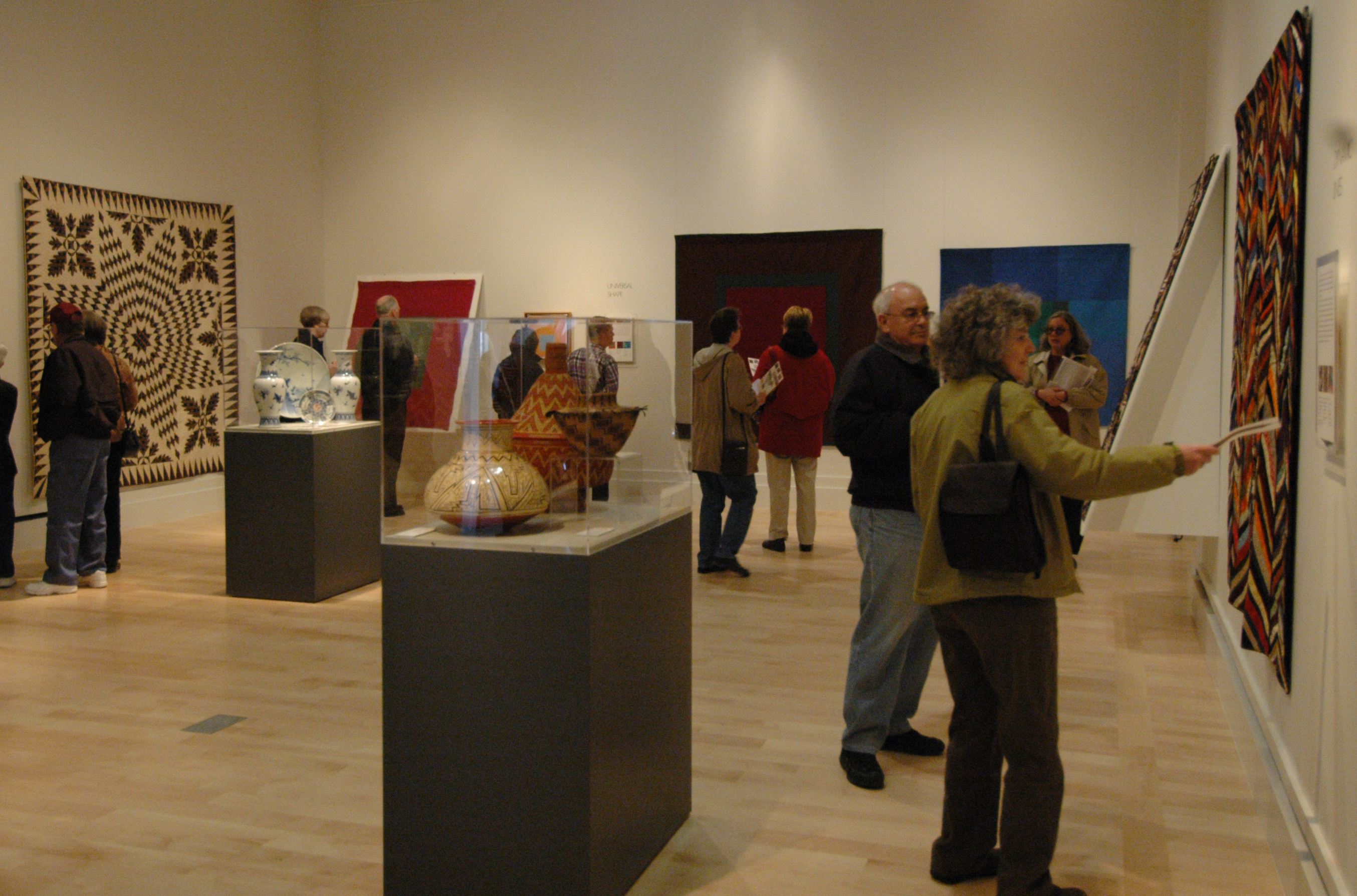
International Quilt Study Center & Museum Quilts Exhibition

=== Light ===
- Light is necessary to view objects in museums, but can cause quite a bit of damage if quilts are left exposed. Ultraviolet radiation and visible light can each affect textile materials such as quilts. Light can cause fading, darkening, yellowing, embrittlement, stiffening, and more. Many museums utilize motion activated lights and rotating displays to mitigate the effects of light on objects.

=== Relative humidity and temperature ===
- Relative humidity refers to the amount of moisture in the air. Fluctuations in moisture can cause textile materials to expand and contract at different rates and can also promote mold, mildew, corrosion, and bleeding of dyes.
- Much as with incorrect relative humidity, the presence of water can cause mold, mildew, bleeding of dyes, and further damage to quilts.
- High and low temperatures and temperature fluctuations can case damage to the different textiles in quilts. High temperatures can speed up chemical reactions and cause damage to fibers and dyes.

=== Pollutants ===
- Pollutants may be many things including dirt, grease, ash, soot, sulfur dioxide, hydrogen sulfide, nitrogen dioxide, formaldehyde, and ozone. Many of these pollutants/contaminants may cause issues with textiles such as quilts, especially in the case of certain composite quilts or those made with silks that have metals included. Common pollutants that may affect textiles such as quilts include; sulfuric and nitric acid which react with cotton, linen, and viscose materials and can cause them to discolor and become weak and brittle.

=== Physical forces, fire, and pests ===
- Physical forces can include shock, vibration, abrasion, and more that can cause cumulative damage. Quilts are often touched by visitors which can cause physical damage as well as imparting oils, creams, and salts from hands. Due to their large size, quilts require adequate support to ensure that they do not come apart under their own weight.
- Thieves, Vandals, and physical forces are factors for conservators, restorers, and other museum staff to consider, especially regarding storage and presentation.
- Fire can be an issue for quilts in museums as most textile materials are flammable, though storing them correctly can help keep them away from smaller fires. If quilts are exposed to fire, they can be charred, destroyed, embrittled, scorched, or even harbor smoke.
- Pests, mainly insects and rodents, can damage quilts through consumption, perforation, cutting, grazing, tunneling, weakening, disfiguring, and more. Throughout history, quilts have been made of many different types of materials. If they are made of animal based, synthetic, or plant based textiles materials, different pests can be attracted to them. Most quilts are made of cotton or linen, though silk is also an option. Silverfish, carpet beetles, and moths are all common pests that can damage quilts.
- Disassociation, often the mishandling or misfiling of objects, can become a problem especially in museums that have multiple quilts and do not keep good records on them. One could be forgotten about, not recorded as moved, or lost entirely.

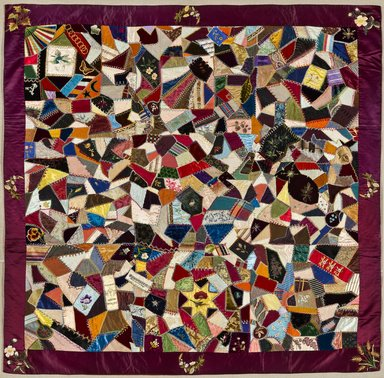
This quilt, created in 1884, is being held at the Brooklyn Museum. Composed of velvet and silk, this piece requires careful thought when conserving/restoring it.

== Preventive Conservation ==
Direct treatment may be necessary for some objects in a museum but, for many others, preventive conservation is often considered the best course of action. Preventive conservation, sometimes called collections care, involves any actions taken to prevent or delay the deterioration of cultural heritage. The primary goal is to identify and reduce potential hazards to heritage with thoughtful control of their surroundings. Preventive conservation utilizes environmental monitoring and regulation to create the ideal space for objects. The aim is to reduce deterioration; this method can be used for most items in museums including quilts. If preventive conservation options run out, then treatment by a professional can commence. Conservation treatment becomes necessary when there is damage from the absence of preventive care, with improper care, other issues, or even with inherently unstable objects.

=== Environment ===
The correct storage of textiles such as quilts is important for their long-term safety. Light, temperature, and humidity are the main factors that impact a textile's deterioration rate. Pests, chemicals, and pollutants may also damage quilts in storage and display environments. Conservators monitor and evaluate museum environments to ensure the longevity of objects stored within. Besides monitoring for pests, chemicals, pollutants, light and humidity levels by themselves, these museum professionals check for any other visible signs and causes of deterioration.

=== Storage ===
Quilts and other similar textiles can be stored in more than one way. The prerequisites for all storage environments include a clean, dark, cool, and dry space with constant temperature and relative humidity. Flat storage such as shelves and drawers may be used for smaller quilts, but for larger quilts, rolled storage may become necessary. Best practices for storage of quilts include; rolling quilts around acid-free or fabric-covered tubes and storing horizontally on racks, storing them in archival-safe containers, and airing them out before storing. If utilizing other fabrics in the storage of quilts, it is common practice to boil-wash these fabrics to remove the manufacturer finish and any pollutants, as well as to soften the fabric.

=== Handling ===
The handling of textiles can vary depending on age, materials, and level of damage. If a quilt is in need of treatment, however, handling may become necessary. When handling any object, it is important to first plan ahead and make sure that the object is not being handled unnecessarily and that it is supported at all times. Best practices in the handling of textiles such as quilts involves clean cloth gloves, a clean working and display area, and the use of pencils instead of ink pens in the work area. Other physical factors may cause damage while handling a quilt; this includes snagging and pulling, uneven support, and improper movement. To reduce risks of these hazards, best practice include the following; avoiding jewelry and clothing that could snag the item, working on surfaces larger than the quilt itself, and maintaining even support through the process of transportation.

=== Display/Exhibition ===
As with handling and storage, environmental factors need to be taken into account when displaying quilts and textiles. Though each individual item will need to be examined and treated based on its individual needs, there are some commonalities between them that museums take into account when putting them in exhibitions. According to the International Quilt Study Center & Museum, quilts are displayed for one out of ten years total, though not necessarily consecutively. This "minimizes the amount of light exposure and reduces the wear and tear from hanging on display." A majority of quilts are put on display using cord suspension systems and often have cotton sleeves attached to reduce stress to the fibers.

=== Maintenance/Housekeeping ===
Before any maintenance or housekeeping can take place, conservators first examine the quilt to decide on the best course of action moving forward. Vacuuming, wet cleaning, dry cleaning, steaming, and ironing are possible methods of maintenance of quilts. Vacuuming is often considered one of the least invasive and easiest ways to clean a quilt and allows dirt and dust to be removed in a minimally-invasive way. As wet cleaning is more invasive than vacuuming, best practices recommend it only be used when necessary. Understanding the chemical composition, characteristics of the fibers, which dyes were used, and what soils are present is important before using any wet-cleaning methods on the quilt.

== Conservation Treatment ==
In terms of restoring museum objects, buildings, textiles, etc., treatment refers to more than just the physical processes used to bring these items back to their original state. Treatment is the process from assessment and analysis to the physical work to restore the item. Often called interventive conservation, this "refers to any direct interaction between the conservator and the material fabric of the object." Interventive treatment can be done for "aesthetic choices, stabilization needs for structural integrity, or cultural requirements for intangible continuity. Preventive conservation is commonly preferred over treatment, but treatment can become necessary. Staff, including the conservator, the curator, designer, and other professionals communicate to decide if treatment is the most viable option. Textile Conservators have a big part in quilt restoration and conservation.

The International Quilt Study Center & Museum notes that "using tools like microscopes, magnifying lenses, and high-resolution digital cameras to closely examine antique quilts and textiles can reveal a great deal about their past and help us determine the best way to safeguard them - and other textiles like them - for the future." Though all treatment can be said to be irreversible, unnecessary and excessive treatment can be especially damaging. When it comes to actually performing treatments on textiles such as quilts, some aspects can be performed by non-professionals: preparing storage, vacuuming, etc. However, according to the National Park Service, conservators must perform the interventive treatments such as "wet and dry cleaning, repair using needle and thread techniques, consolidation with adhesives, application of linings, restoration and reconstructions" and more. Keeping quilts free of dust and pests are great preventive conservation techniques, but may also be considered treatment. To clean a textile such as a quilt, you can vacuum the surface, clean with wet or dry means, or spot treat. As quilts are composite textiles sewn together with thread, a needle and thread may be used to repair them as well - to close seams and provide support. Depending on the specific type of fabric that composes the quilt (inorganic textiles such as silk vs. organic textiles such as cotton), a needle may not be effective or may cause excessive damage. In cases such as this, adhesives may be used to repair/treat the affected area.
