= Quilting bee =

Social gathering to complete a quilt

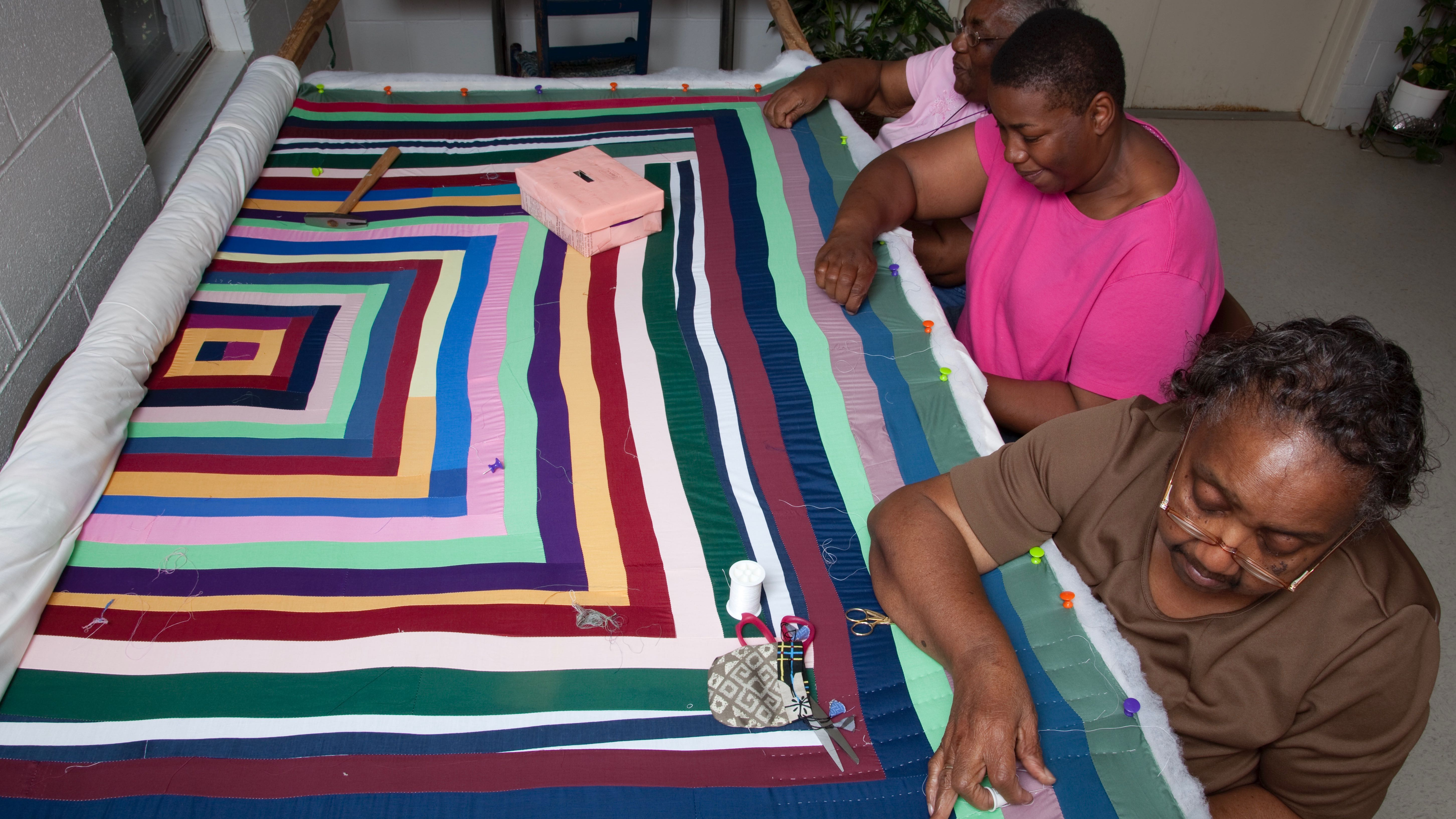
Women from Gee's Bend, Alabama, work on a quilt, 2010

A quilting bee is a social gathering to harness communal work to complete a quilt. The term is commonly used across the United States and Canada. Traditionally a women-only space, the purpose was for the communal work to complete the quilt and as a social event or party. Participants could include only family members, friends, or people drawn from the wider community. Matters of considerable importance and debate were often discussed during quilting bees, such as women's rights. There were multiple events based around quilting. Quilting bees continue to exist in the modern times.

The term "bee" was widely used in colonial America for various communal tasks, reflecting a cultural emphasis on collaborative traditions. The term "quilting bee" gradually evolved to refer specifically to quilting gatherings, symbolizing the significance of communal labor in these events. Other historic terms include quilting feast, quilting frolic, quilting-match, and quilting party.

== Social gatherings ==
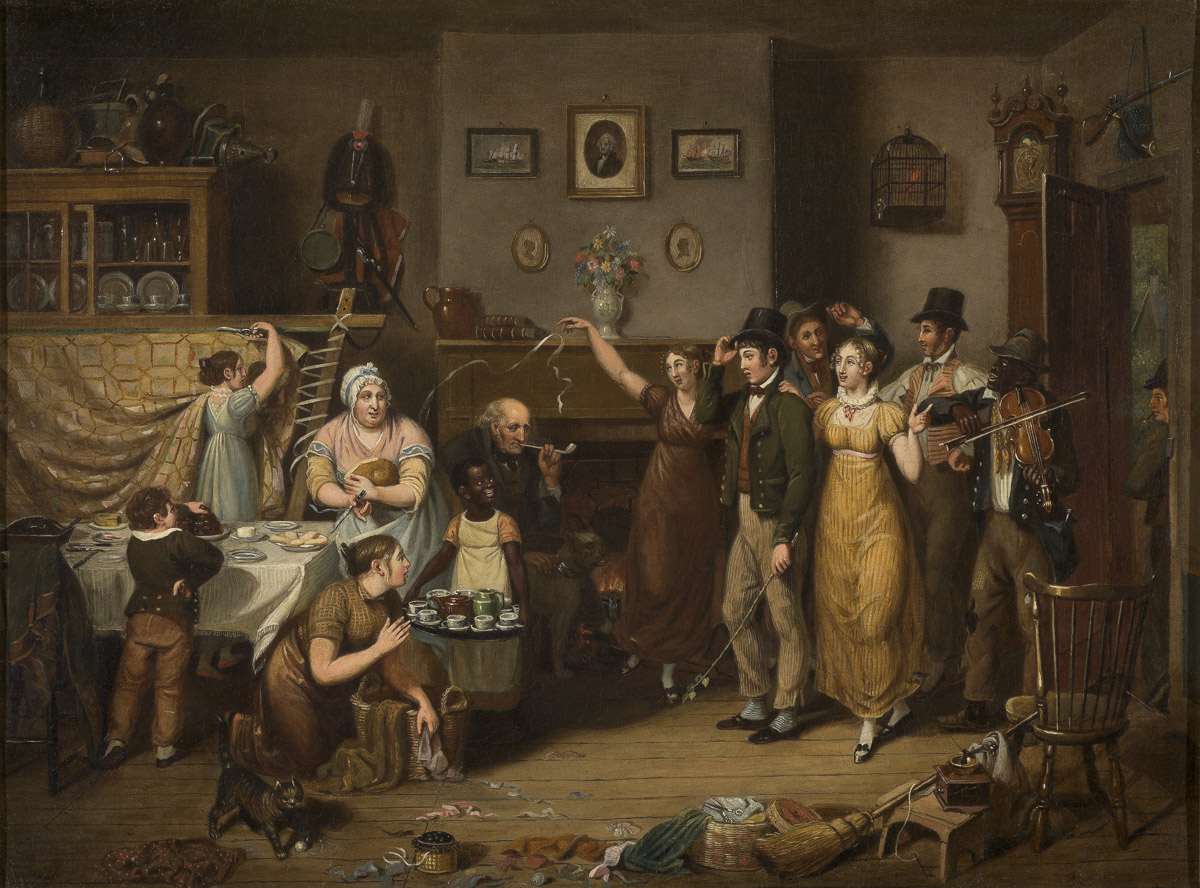
Quilting Frolic (1813), by John Lewis Krimmel. Painted in Philadelphia.

The production of textiles created some of the approved social gatherings for women during the 19th century, with quilting bees being occasions for both collaborative work and time with loved ones. While the primary purpose of the bee was to help each woman finish a quilt, its true significance was the chance it provided for women to "swap news, share recipes, offer home remedies, exchange fabric scraps, discuss personal issues, learn new techniques, and teach their daughters". Quilting bees ranged from a spontaneous meeting of nearby family or friends to events that had a significant amount of people. Even those lacking skill in sewing were welcomed, since their culinary abilities could be utilized to create a feast at the day's conclusion.

Matters of importance were often discussed during quilting bees. Susan B. Anthony, as a teenager, delivered her initial speeches advocating for women's rights at the events. Men frequently participated in the festivities that followed the end of a quilting bee, and these events often resulted in romantic interactions. The quilting bee's status as a social event in the 19th century is supported by the many "references, diaries, paintings, poetry, and songs".

Quilting bees also occurred in Canada, and the book The Pioneers of Old Ontario mentioned husking bees for the men happening after. Quilting bees in Canada had a resurgence during World War I and World War II, and the quilts would be sent to overseas soldiers and British families who lost their homes due to bombing.

== Events ==
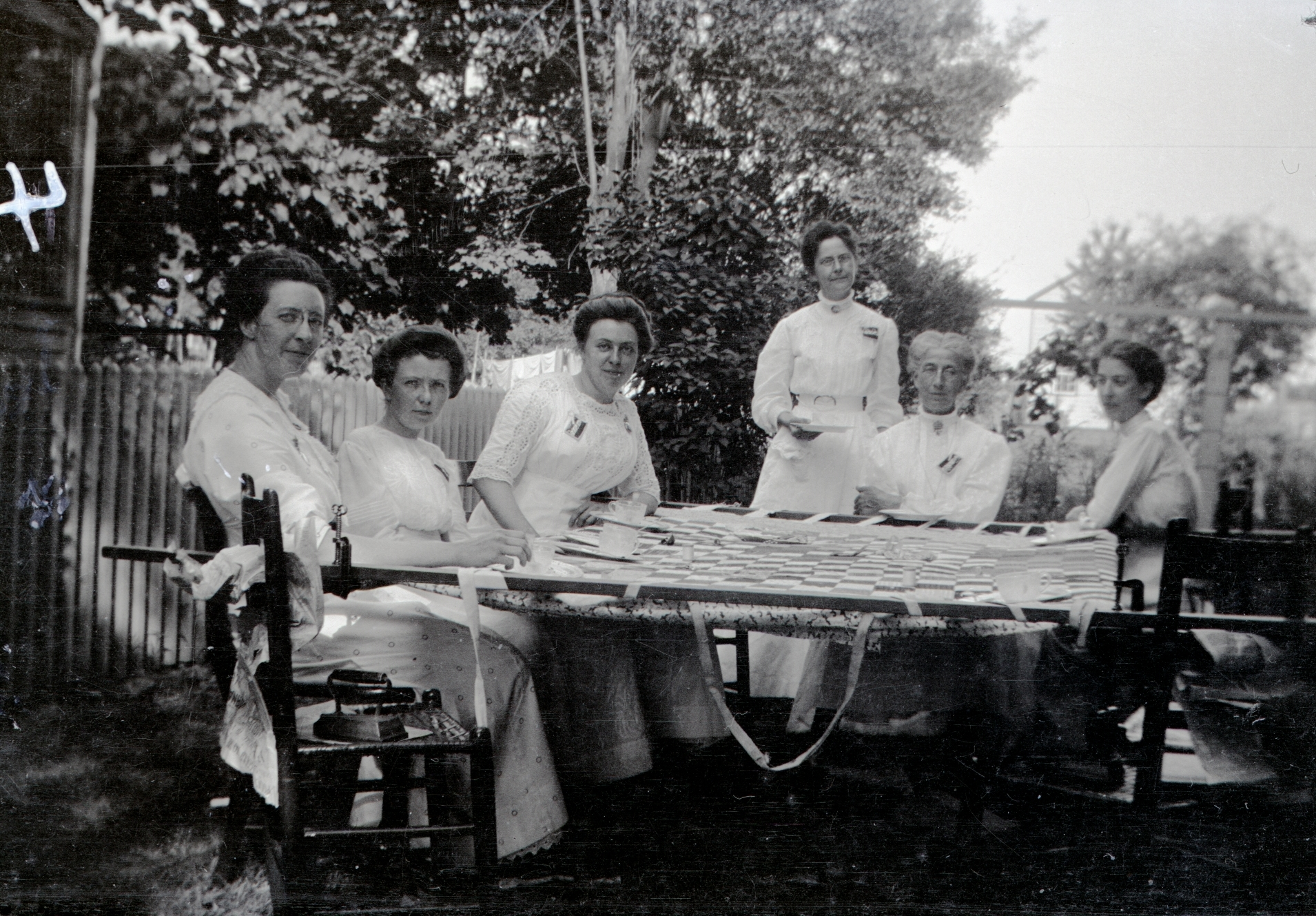
Quilting bee, circa 1910s, United States

In the late 18th century, diarist Martha Ballard documented how her neighbors instructed her daughters on how to set up the family loom, while also noting quilting gatherings that were meant to prepare her daughters for domestic life. However, this represented a small part of those gatherings. This was prior to the term "quilting bee" which originated in the 19th century.

Quilting bees grew competitive, as all the young girls aimed to show their finest stitching. When it came time for the final row of quilting, the married women would step back, allowing the girls to compete for the honor of placing the last stitch, as it was thought that the one who won would be the next to get married. Quilts for brides were typically created during quilting bees. These quilts had designs that represented love, loyalty, and fertility. They were frequently placed in chests as a treasured heirloom to be passed down from mother to daughter.

Custom was that every young girl aimed to possess 13 quilts for her marriage dowry, kept in her dower check by the time she wed. In certain areas, she crafted and stitched the quilts herself. A quilting bee would be organized to complete either all of the quilts or just the 13th quilt. Friendship quilts, often featuring stitched or written names, were a favored creation at quilting bees. These quilts were crafted by women from a community or church parish as a farewell gift for a friend relocating to a new home. Individual patches of designated sizes were created independently and then assembled by a group. Album quilts also recorded the significant events in a family's life.

== Modern quilting bees ==
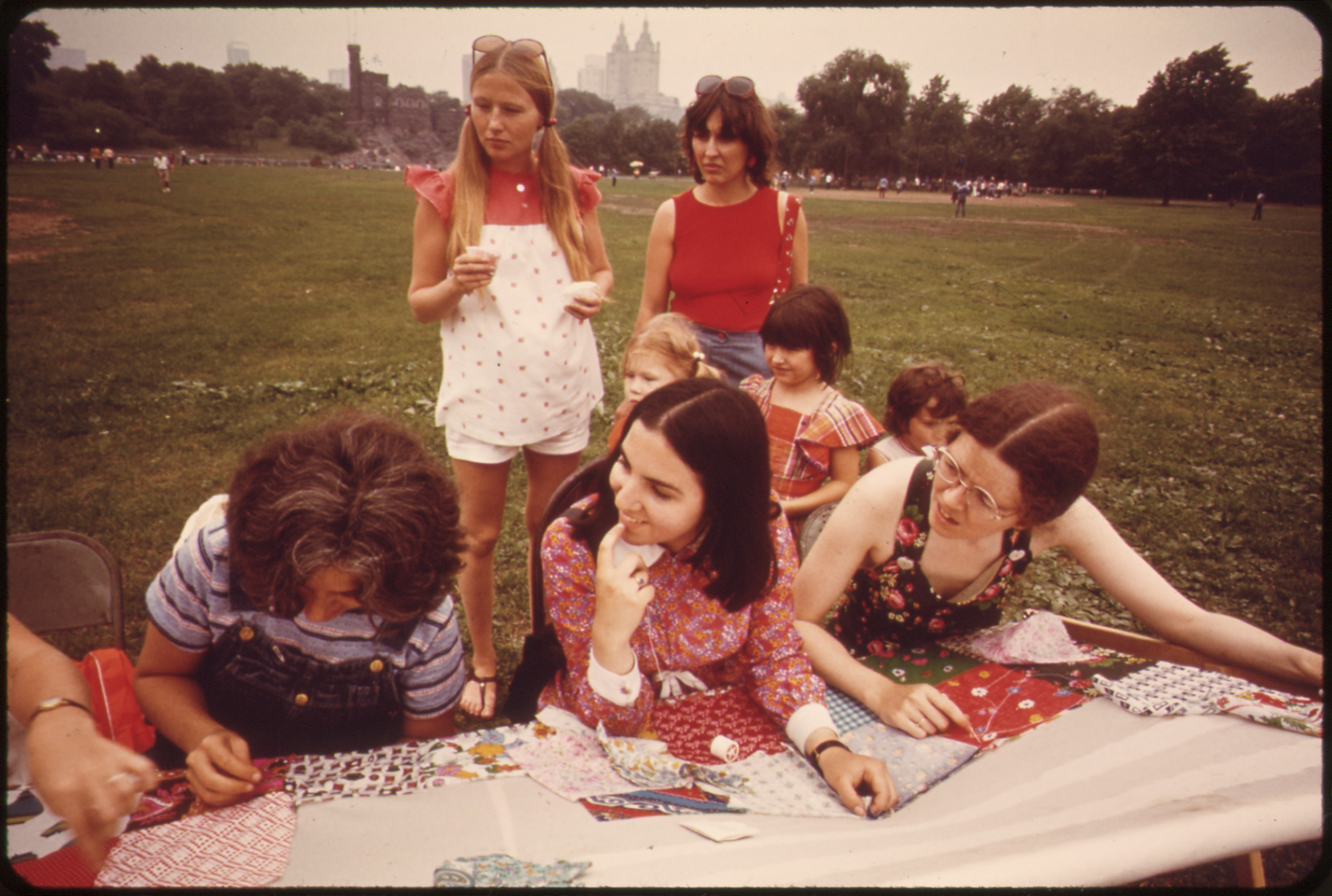
Midsummer evening quilting bee in Central Park. Materials were provided free by New York Parks, June 1973.

In the women's movement and the quilting revival at the end of the 20th century, quilting gatherings started the establishment of quilt guilds and various small quilting groups. Many groups refer to themselves as "bees", quilt shops incorporate the term in their names, and there are also "virtual bees" that exist to foster online communities.

Several quilting groups active today have been gathering regularly since the early 1900s. Following the revival of crafting in the 1970s, craftspeople continued to participate in quilting. Quilting bees typically gather once or twice monthly to sew quilts, providing an opportunity for members to exchange ideas and techniques while reconnecting with one another. Quilting groups also plan various events, such as showcasing their creations, hosting holiday fairs, inviting quilt historians to speak, and arranging demonstrations led by instructors. Occasionally, the quilting group reaches a global level, such as the Olympic Games Quilt Project led by the Georgia Quilt Council.
