= G112 =

G112 may refer to:

- China National Highway 112
- a painting of the William Rush and His Model series by Thomas Eakins
