= G109 =

G109 may refer to:

- China National Highway 109
- a painting of the William Rush and His Model series by Thomas Eakins

G 109 may refer to:

- Grob G 109
