= G111 =

G111 may refer to:

- China National Highway 111
- a painting of the William Rush and His Model series by Thomas Eakins

G-111 may refer to:

- G-111 (originally SA-16A), a USAF version of the HU-16 Albatross flying boat
