= Frederick Graff =

American hydraulic engineer

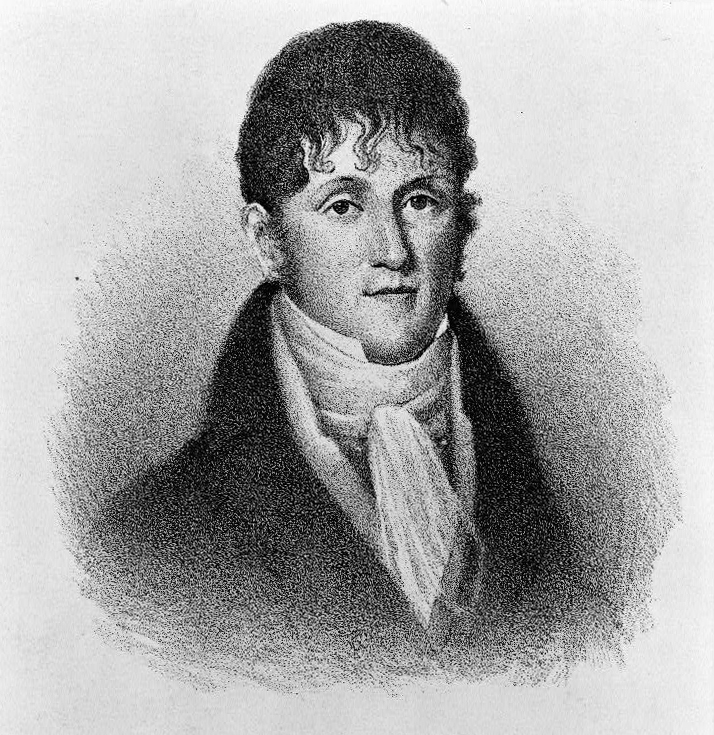
- Born: 27 August 1775; Philadelphia, Pennsylvania, U.S.
- Died: 13 April 1847 (aged 71); Philadelphia, Pennsylvania, U.S.
- Resting place: Laurel Hill Cemetery, Philadelphia, Pennsylvania, U.S.
- Engineering career
- Discipline: hydraulic engineer
- Projects: Fairmount Water Works

Frederick Graff (27 August 1775 – 13 April 1847) was an American hydraulic engineer who designed and built the Fairmount Water Works in Philadelphia, Pennsylvania, and unofficially invented the fire hydrant.

== Biography ==
Graff was son to Jacob Graff, Jr., a bricklayer who is noted for renting out the second floor of his house to Thomas Jefferson where he wrote the Declaration of Independence in 1776. Graff began his career as a carpenter but suffered a severe knee injury with a hatchet which left him unable to work as a carpenter and lame for the rest of his life. In 1799, he was hired by Benjamin Henry Latrobe as a draftsman and worked his way up to clerk and superintendent of works. In 1800, Graff was placed in charge of the design and building of the Branch Bank of Deposit in Norfolk, Virginia. Graff was also employed as engineer of the Santee Canal in South Carolina. He returned to Philadelphia and on April 1, 1805, was assigned as superintendent and engineer of the construction of the first water works in Philadelphia in Centre Square, the site of the current day Philadelphia City Hall. On 1 April 1805, he was elected superintendent and engineer of the works, but they were determined to be inadequate after several years of usage.

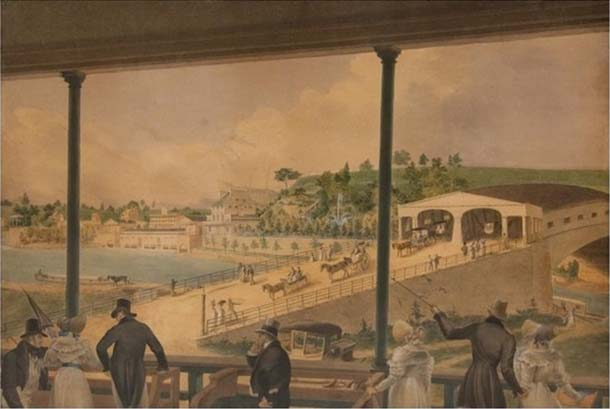
John Rubens Smith, A View of Fairmount and the Water-Works, 1837

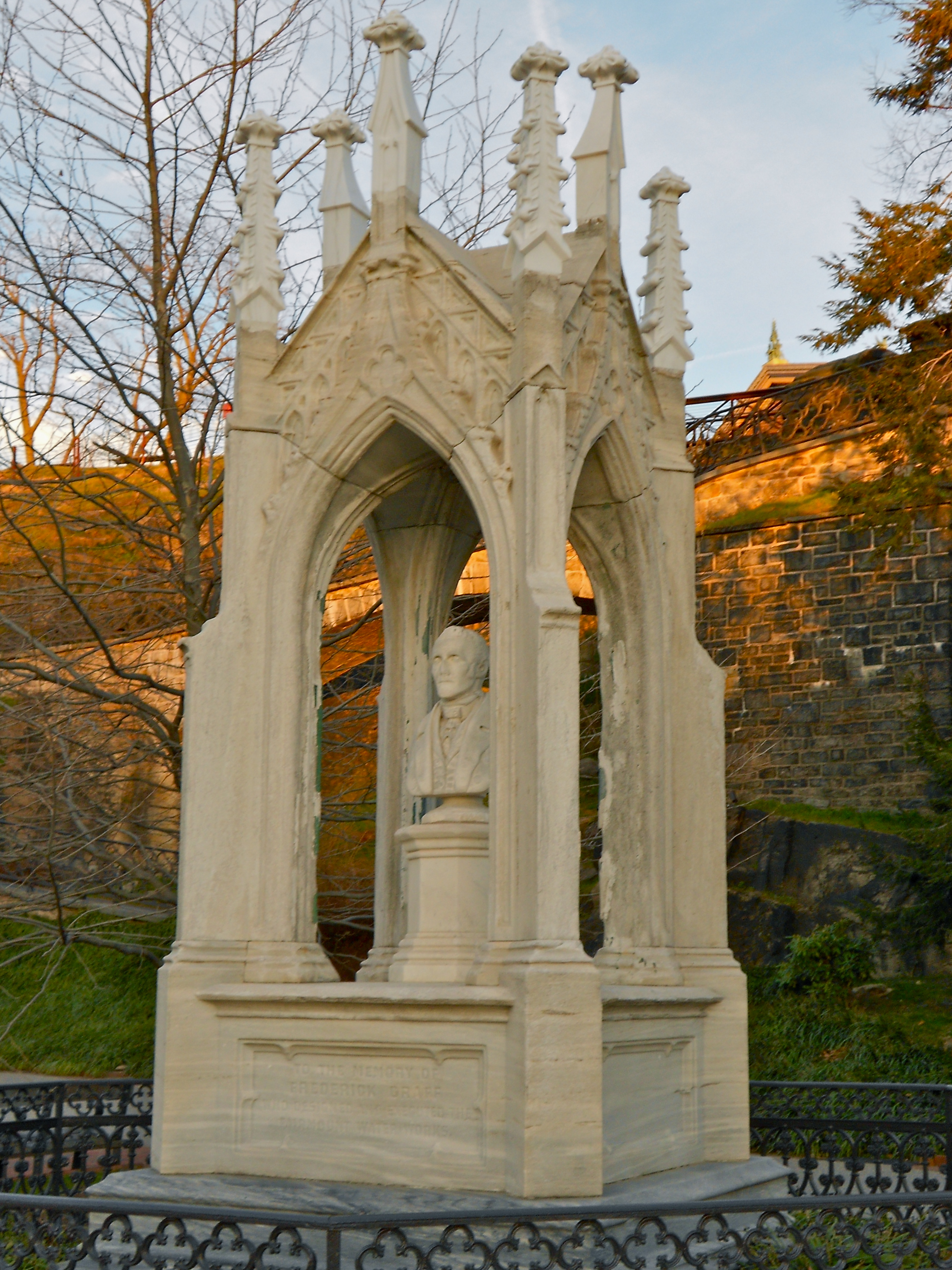
Graff Memorial

In 1811 Graff recommended Fairmount as the proper place for the water works, and was placed in charge of the construction. At this time, the pipes were made of wood, but Graff devised an iron-pipe system to be used instead. These were the first large size iron pipes used in the United States. The Philadelphia waterworks was the first large-scale, municipal waterworks in the United States. Graff's designs of fire plugs and stopcocks were sent to England and deemed to be superior to the ones used in England. In 1822, when the basic system was complete, the city water committee sent him a resolution of thanks, and he was presented with a silver vase. In 1828 he received another award from the water committee “as a testimonial of respect for his talents and zeal effectually displayed in overcoming unforeseen difficulties encountered in the construction of the northeast reservoir at Fairmount". His experience and ability became acknowledged throughout the country, and he supplied detailed information to aid in the development of 37 other waterworks in the United States, including those in New York City and Boston.

By 1842, over 113 miles of water mains had been laid. He was engaged for 42 years in the service of the city of Philadelphia, and a monument to his memory was erected on the grounds of the Fairmount Water Works.

Graff invented the modern fire hydrant in 1801. His design had a hose-faucet outlet on a cylinder with a valve at the top. It is believed he held the patent for invention of the fire hydrant but this cannot be confirmed since the U.S. Patent Office burned down in 1836 and many records were destroyed.

He died on April 13, 1847, and was interred at Laurel Hill Cemetery. His son, Frederic Graff, Jr., succeeded him as chief engineer of the Philadelphia water works.
