= Fairmount Water Works =

Municipal waterworks in Philadelphia, Pennsylvania

- U.S. National Register of Historic Places
- U.S. National Historic Landmark
- Philadelphia Register of Historic Places
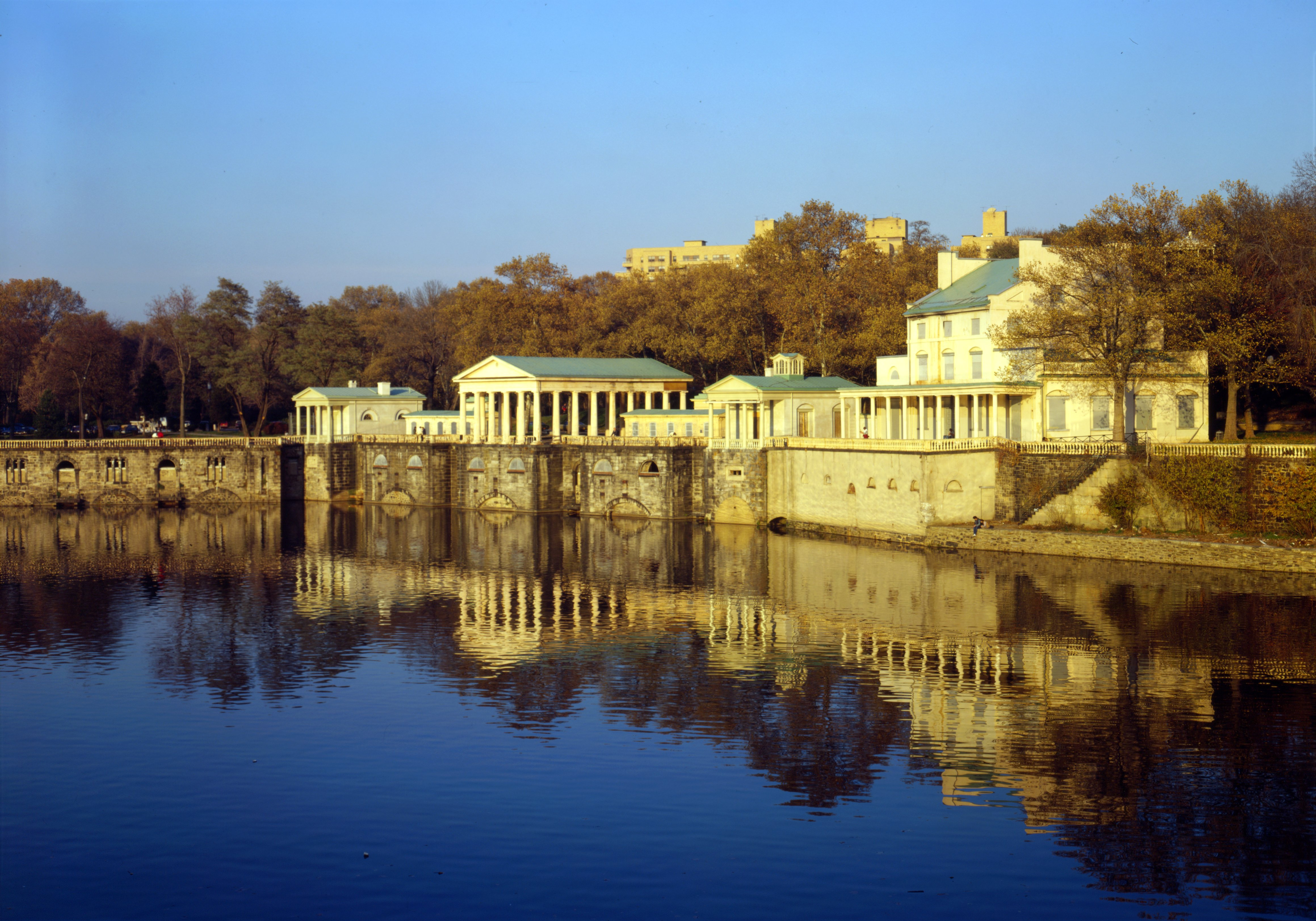
- Fairmount Water Works and the east bank of the Schuylkill River in December 1984

- Location within Philadelphia Location within Pennsylvania Location within the United States
- Location: Philadelphia, Pennsylvania, U.S.
- Coordinates: 39°57′56″N 75°10′51″W
- Built: 1812–1815
- Architect: Frederick Graff et al.
- Architectural style: Mid 19th Century Revival, Palladian
- NRHP reference No.: 76001662

Significant dates
- Added to NRHP: May 11, 1976
- Designated NHL: May 11, 1976

The Fairmount Water Works in Philadelphia, Pennsylvania, was Philadelphia's second municipal waterworks. Designed in 1812 by Frederick Graff and originally finished in 1815, it operated until 1909, winning praise for its design and becoming a popular tourist attraction. It now houses a restaurant and an interpretive center that explains the waterworks' purpose and local watershed history. It was designated a National Historic Landmark in 1976 for its architecture and its engineering innovations. It was the nation's first water supply to use paddle wheels to move water.

== History ==
=== 18th century ===
Following a series of yellow fever epidemics in the late 18th century, which was at the time thought to be caused by unclean water or by rotting matter in the streets, city leaders appointed a "Watering Committee". The initial water system was designed by Benjamin Latrobe and accepted by the committee in 1799. His system utilized two steam engines in series to pump water from the Schuylkill River, into the city, then into two wooden tanks that held a total of just 57,000 US gallons (220,000 L). From the wooden tanks, the water was gravity fed into a series of wooden water mains. The system was plagued with problems. If either of the steam engines failed, the water supply to the city was cut off.

The committee began searching for another solution and eventually picked John Davis and Frederick Graff, Latrobe's apprentice and successor as chief engineer, to design a new waterworks, in order to meet the demand of the increasing numbers of city residents and to solve the problem of inadequate storage capacity.

=== 19th century ===
The Fairmount Water Works was initially constructed between 1812 and 1815 on the east bank of the Schuylkill River. The Water Works initially consisted of a 3 million US gallons (11,000,000 L) earthen reservoir atop Faire Mount at the present site of the Philadelphia Museum of Art, and a pump house with two steam engines to pump water. Between 1819 and 1821, a 1,600-foot-long (490 m) dam was built across the Schuylkill to direct water to a Mill House with three water wheels that replaced the steam engines in 1822. Later, Jonval turbines were used to lift the water in a New Mill House and in the renovated Old Mill House.

The facility, the industrial nature of which was disguised by a Classical Revival exterior, became a tourist attraction for its beauty and its location on the riverside. Visitors included Charles Dickens, who praised it for its pleasant design and public usefulness. Another English visitor, Fanny Trollope, in her 1832 book Domestic Manners of the Americans, mentioned the Water Works:

There is one spot, however, about a mile from the town, which presents a lovely scene. The water-works of Philadelphia have not yet perhaps as wide extended fame as those of Marley, but they are not less deserving it. At a most beautiful point of the Schuylkill River the water has been forced up into a magnificent reservoir, ample and elevated enough to send it through the whole city. The vast yet simple machinery by which this is achieved is open to the public, who resort in such numbers to see it, that several evening stages run from Philadelphia to Fair Mount for their accommodation.

The Fairmount Water Works eventually closed in 1909 when several newer and more technologically updated facilities were built.

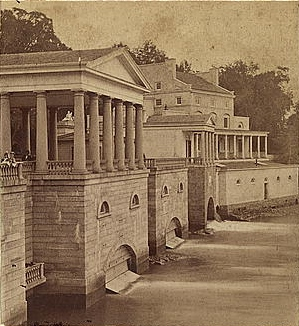
Fairmount Water Works, Philadelphia, between 1860 and 1880

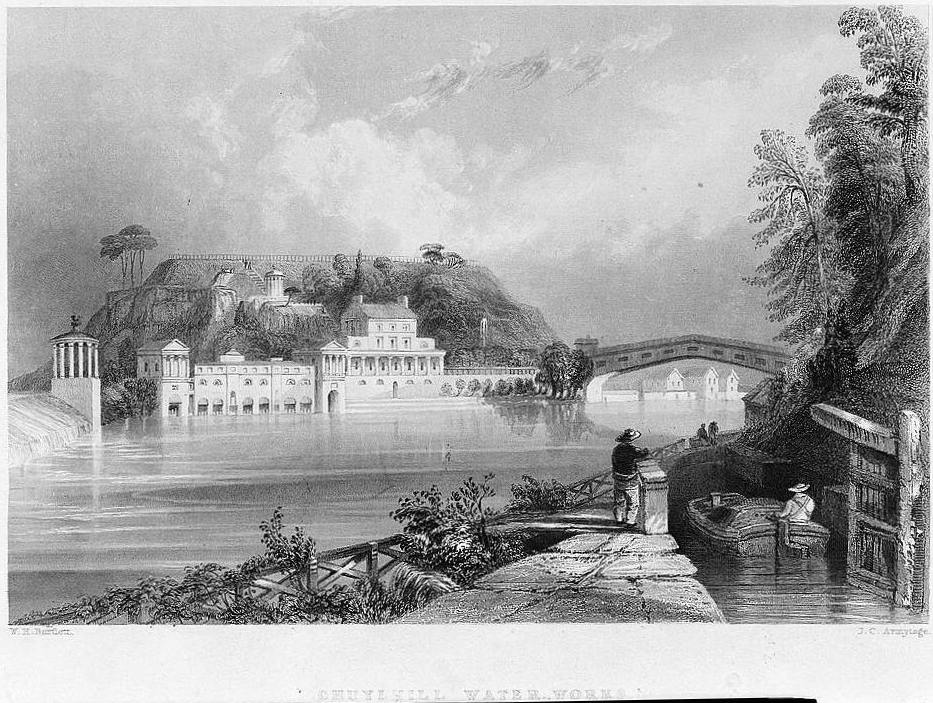
"Schuylkill Waterworks", 1835 engraving

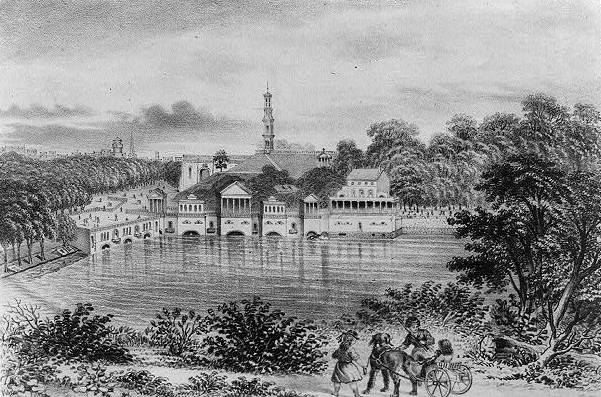
Fairmount Water Works, Philadelphia, about 1874

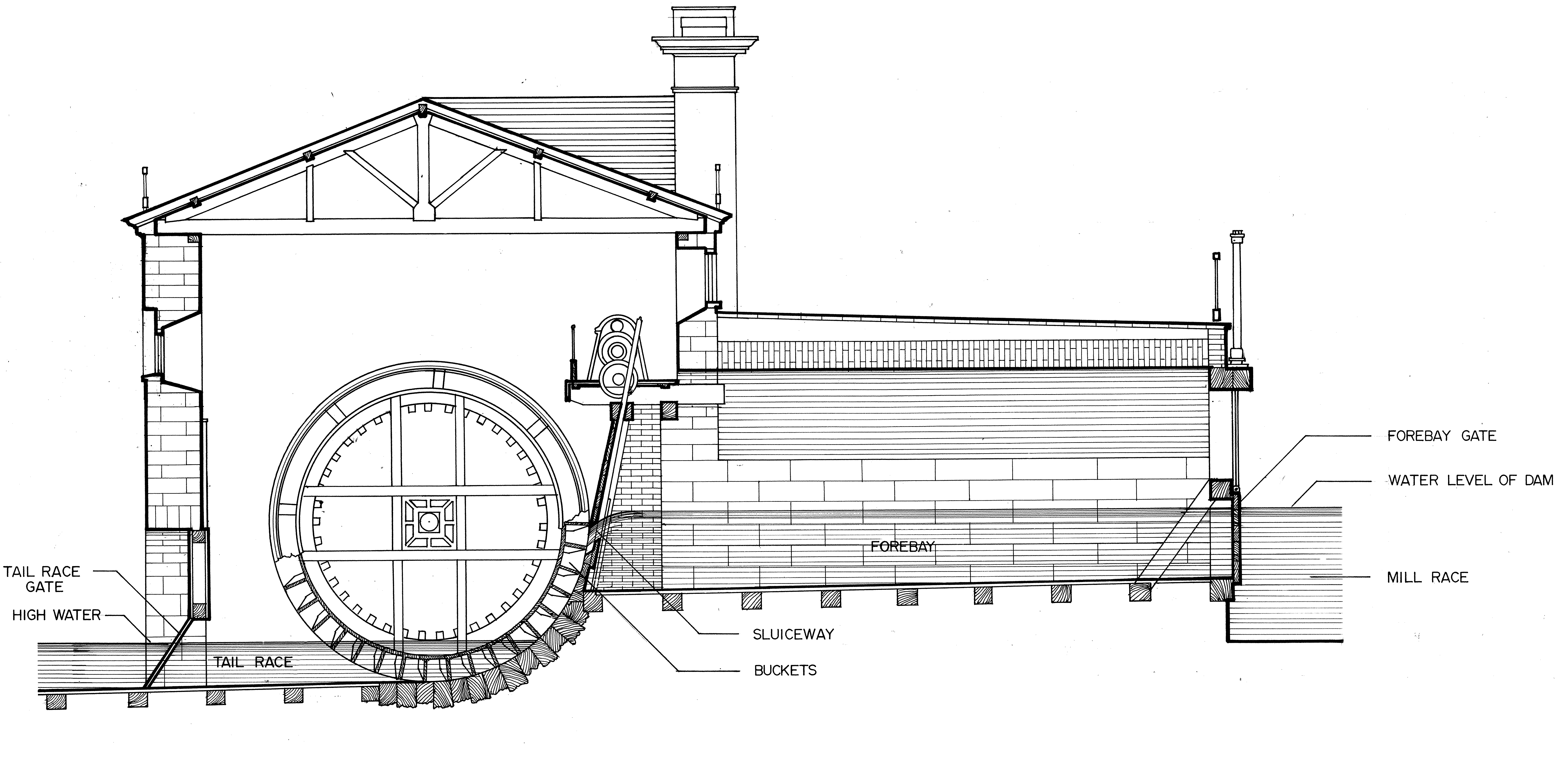
Cutaway showing water wheel

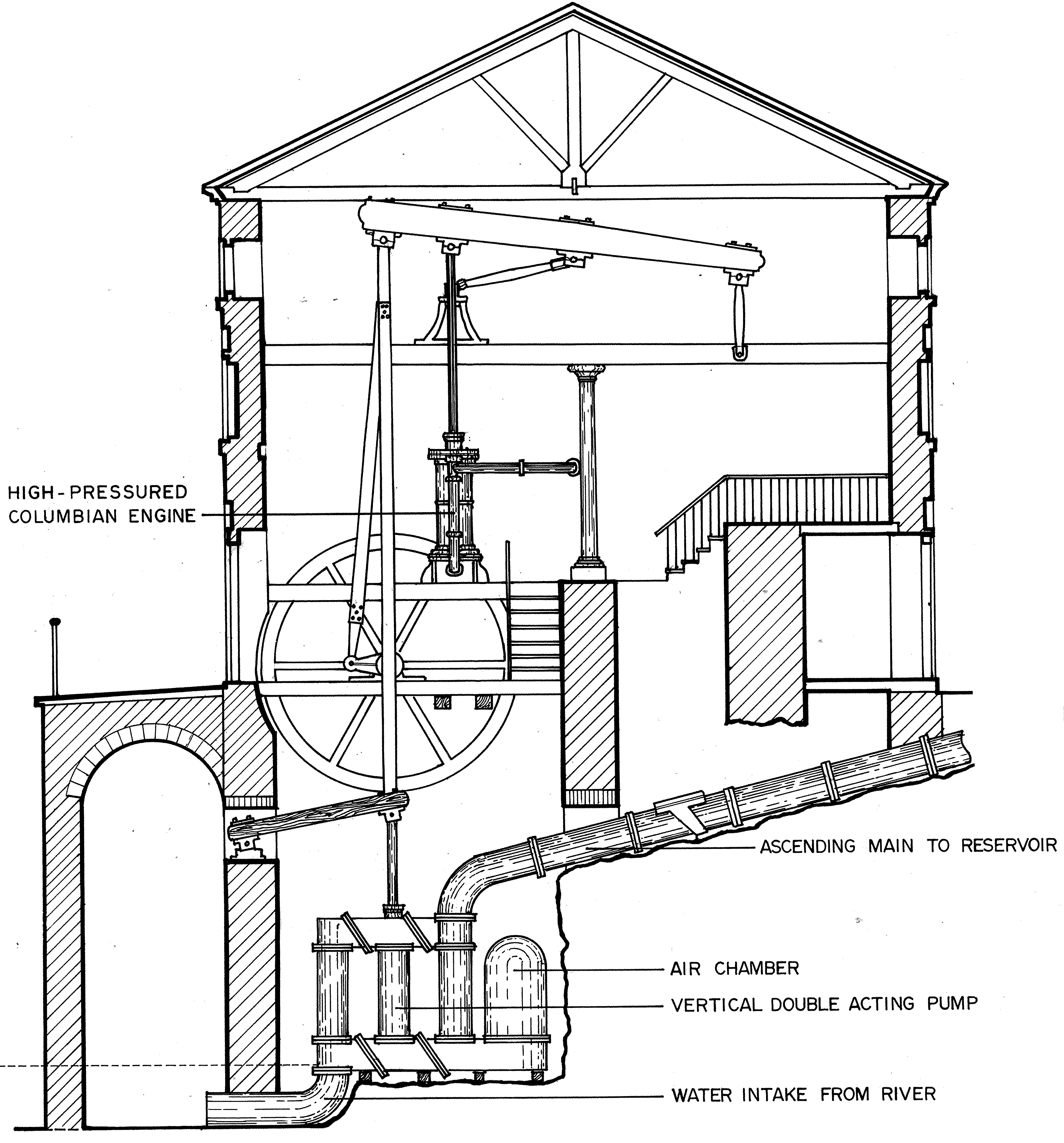
Cutaway showing boiler system

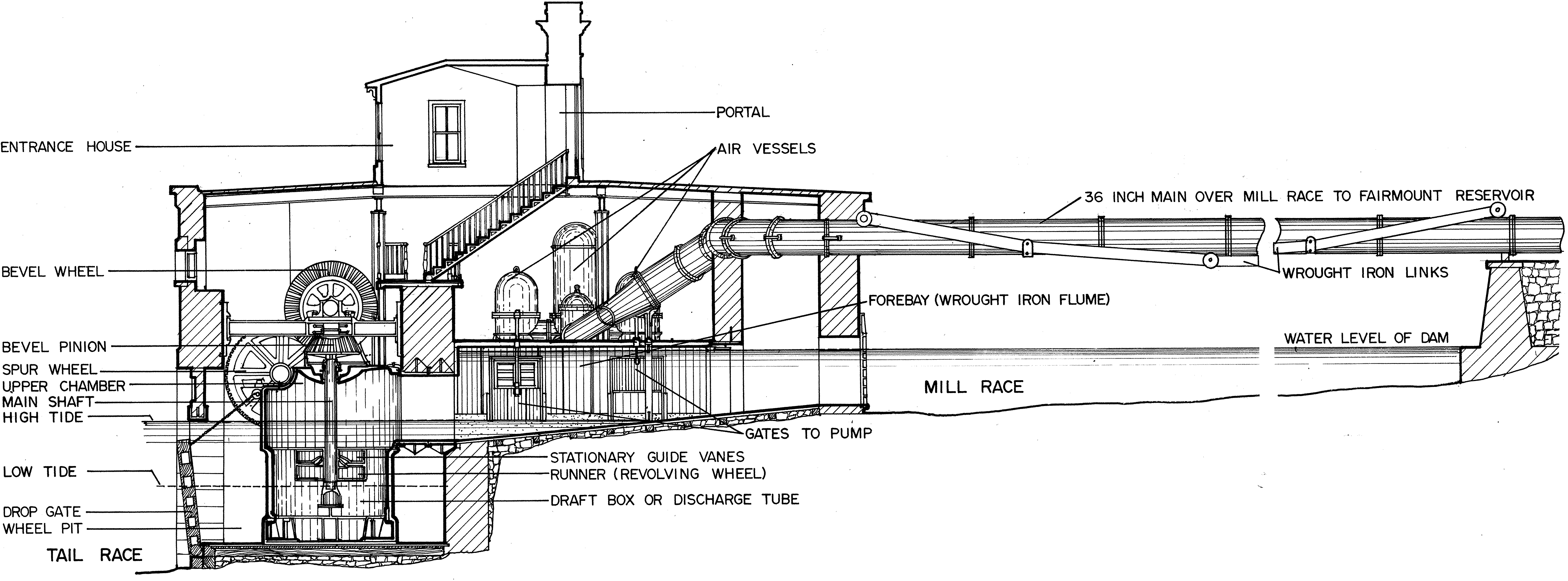
Cutaway showing Jonval turbine

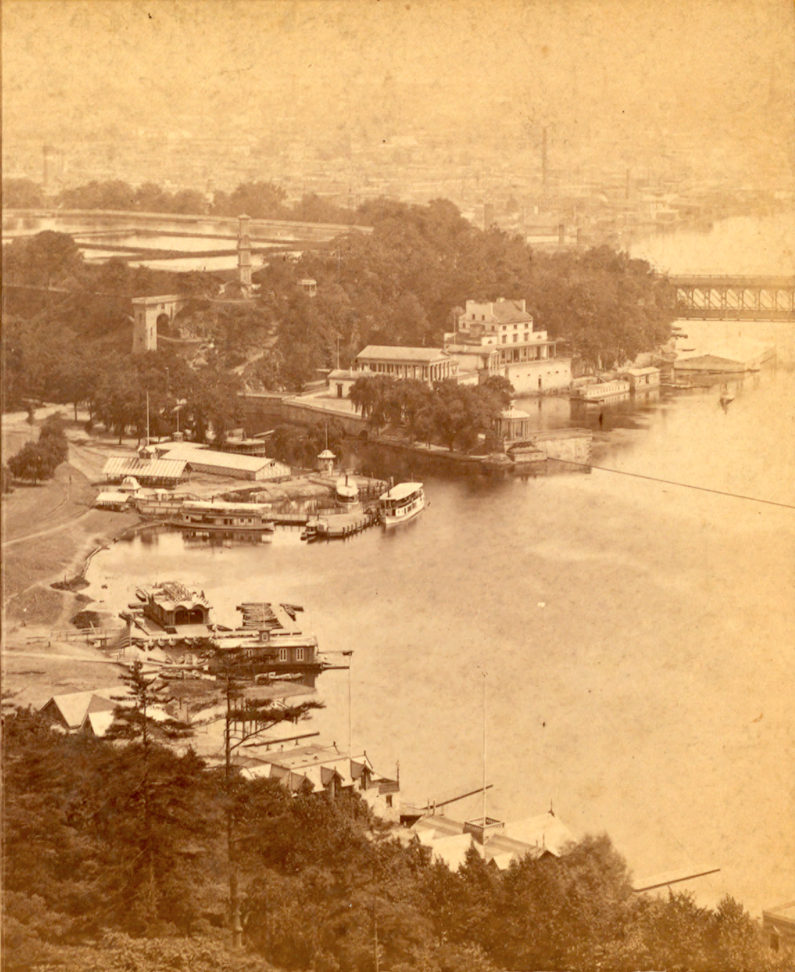
Boathouse Row and Fairmount Water Works from Lemon Hill
(circa 1872–1874)

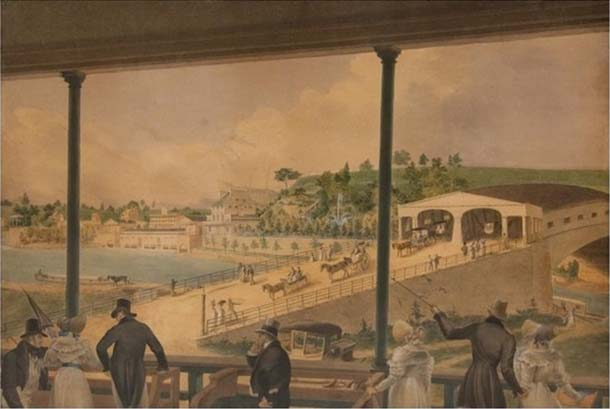
John Rubens Smith, "A View of Fairmount and the Water-Works", 1837

==== Fairmount Dam ====
Completed in 1821, Fairmount Dam cut diagonally across the river, channeled water into the Waterworks, and acted as a spillway. The Schuylkill is a tidal river, so it also prevented brackish water in the Delaware River from mixing with the fresh water. Above it, the dam created the 5-mile (8.0 km) long Fairmount Pool, also called the Schuylkill Pool.

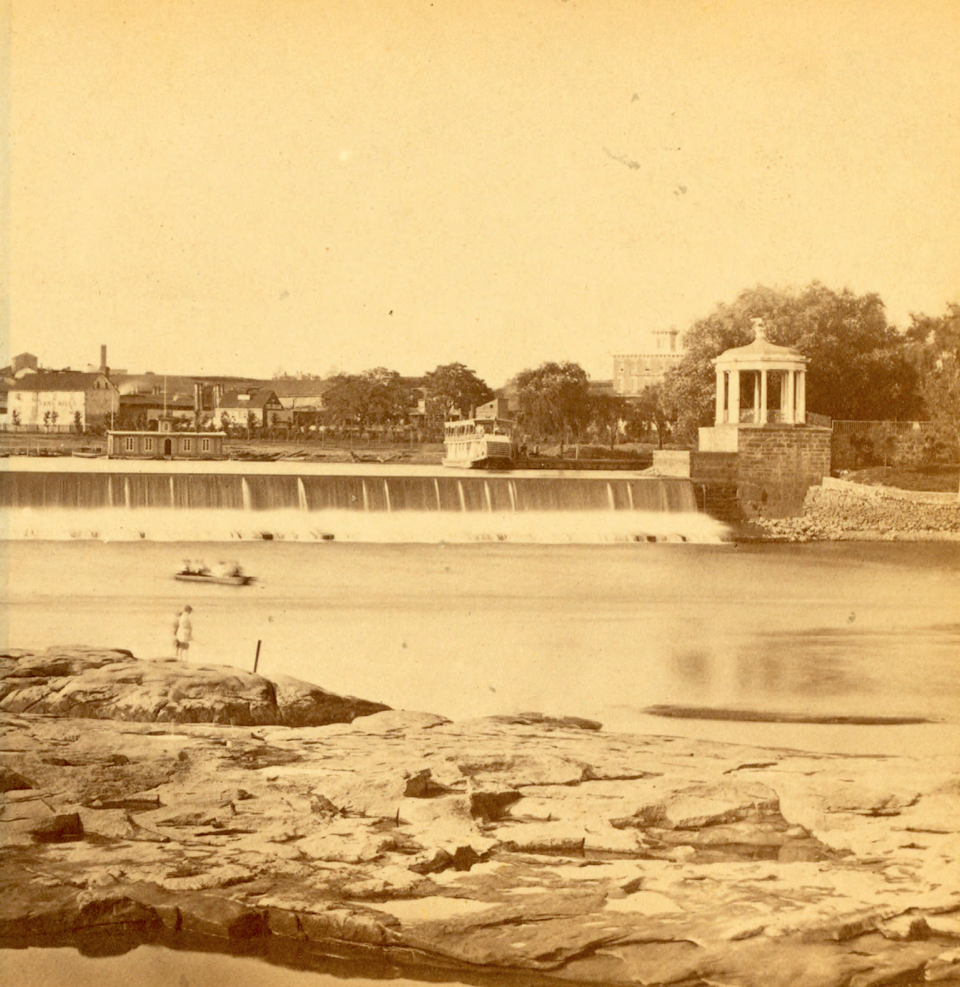
Fairmount Dam, from the rocks below

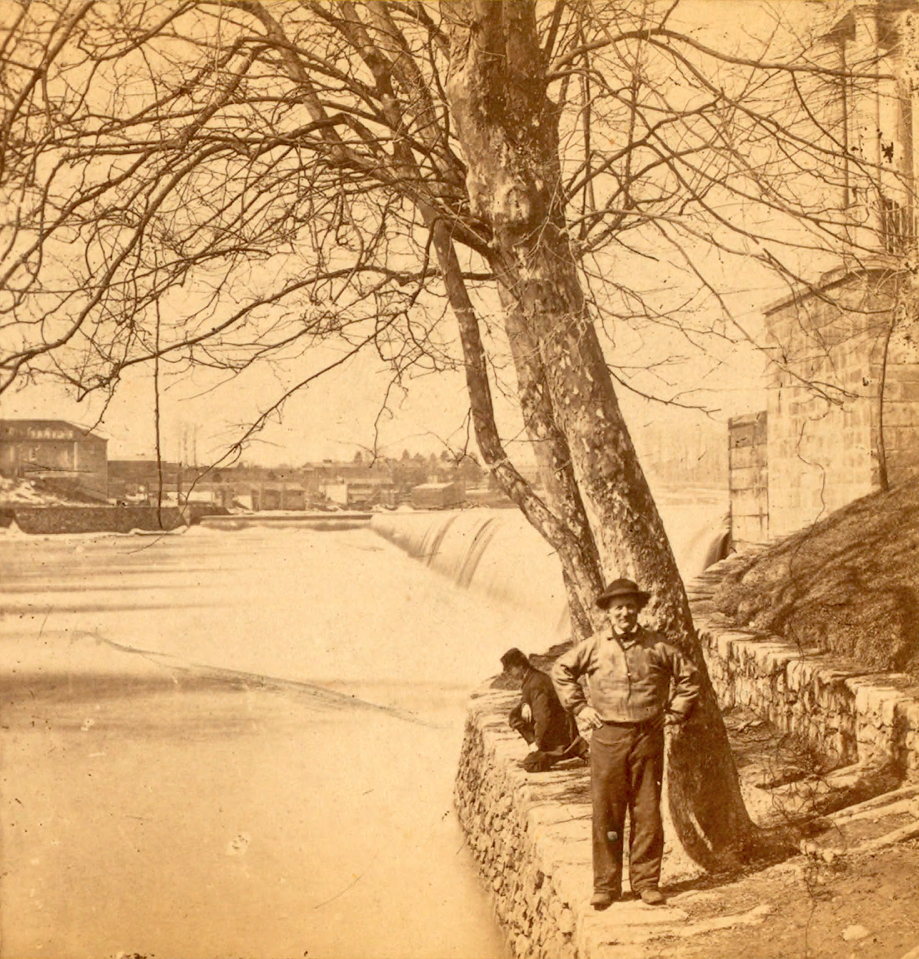
"Fairmount Falls"

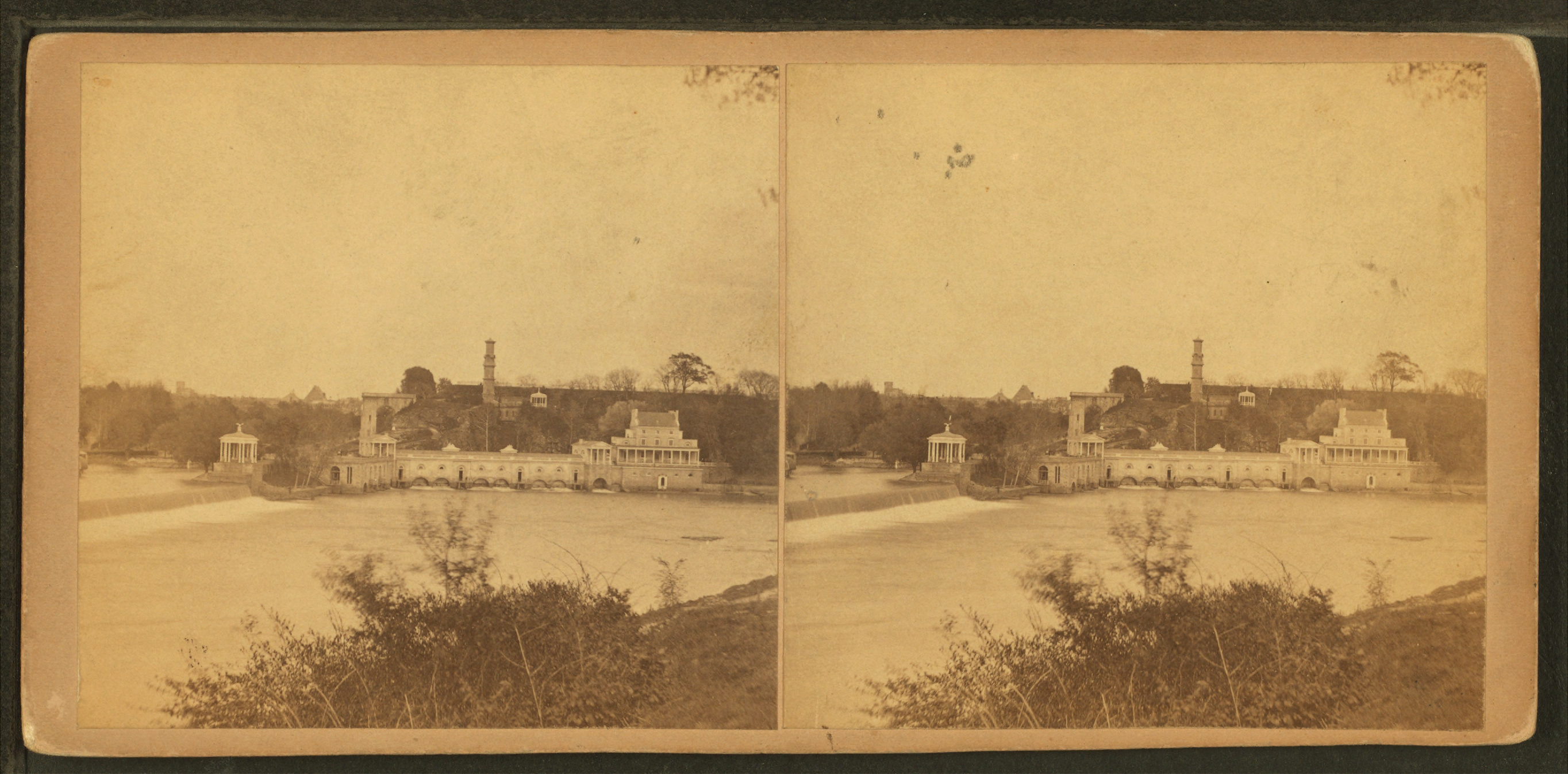
Fairmount Waterworks and Dam, from the west

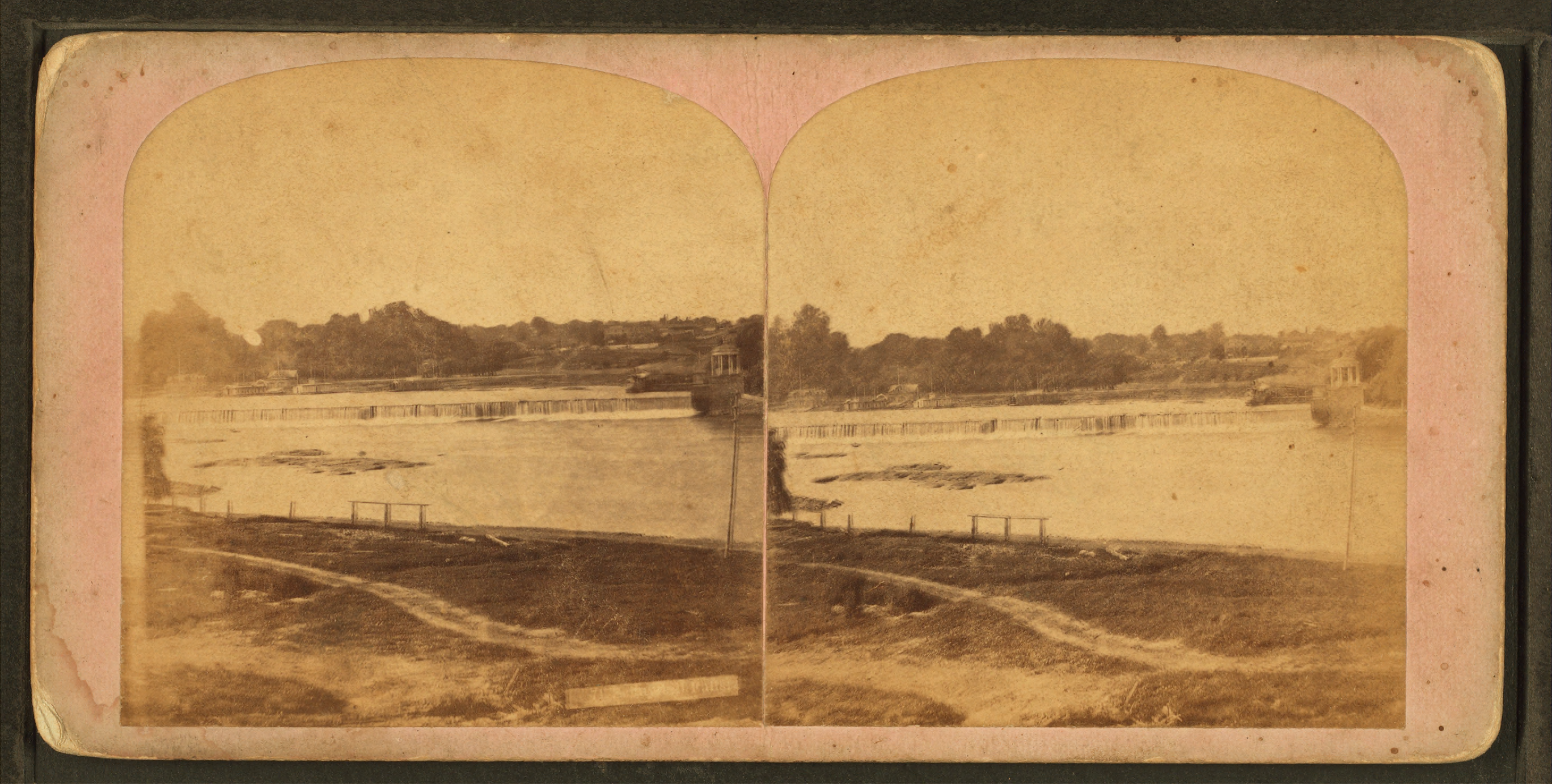
Fairmount Dam, from the south

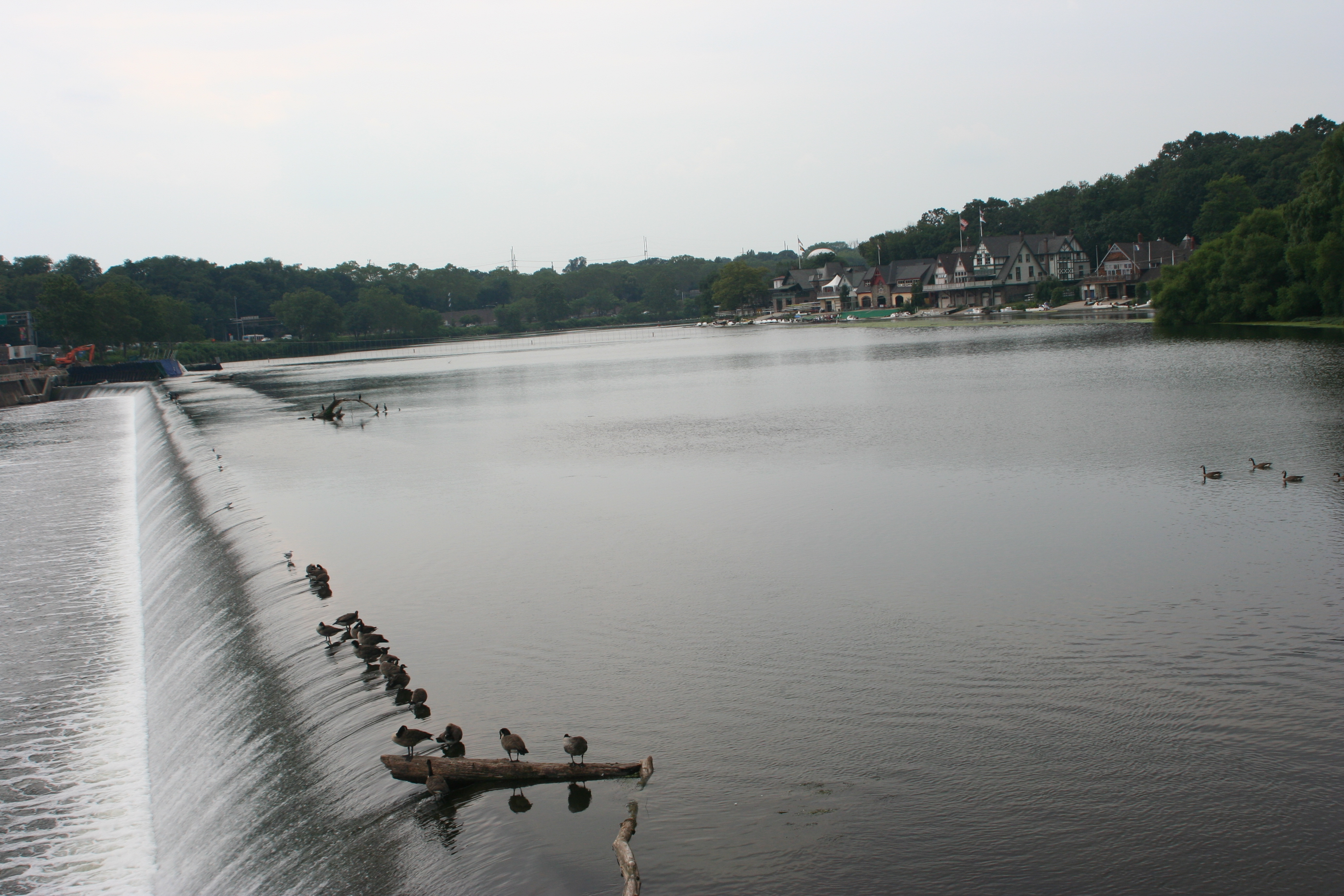
Current dam (built in 1928) and Boathouse Row in the background

=== 20th century ===
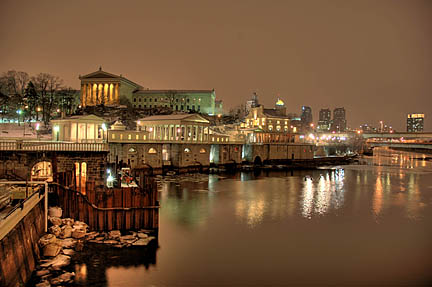
Fairmount Water Works (foreground) and the Philadelphia Museum of Art (background) in February 2007

After the waterworks closed in 1909 the facility was used for several purposes, including the Philadelphia Aquarium, which closed in 1962, and an indoor swimming pool which closed in 1973. Attempts have been made to return the waterworks to its previous position as an engaging tourist attraction. Despite a severe fire which caused setbacks to the restoration, an interpretive center has now been added and tours are regularly given. Its position near Boathouse Row and the Philadelphia Museum of Art is hoped to aid in making it a regularly visited tourist site once more.

The Fairmount Water Works buildings now house the Fairmount Water Works Interpretive Center (FWWIC), a hands-on science and environmental educational center, created by the Philadelphia Water Department. The FWWIC offers interactive exhibits, lectures, events, and school programs.

=== 21st century ===
In December 2004, Michael Karloutsos won a 25-year, $120,000/year lease with the Fairmount Park Commission. After a highly publicized renovation, Karloutsos opened Water Works Restaurant and Lounge within the Water Works on July 20, 2006. This restaurant closed in 2015, and an event venue opened shortly thereafter.

== See also ==
- Fairmount Park
- List of crossings of the Schuylkill River
- List of National Historic Landmarks in Philadelphia
- List of tourist attractions in Philadelphia
- Louis Wernwag
- National Register of Historic Places in North Philadelphia
- Schuylkill Canal
