= William Rush and His Model =

Painting series by Thomas Eakins

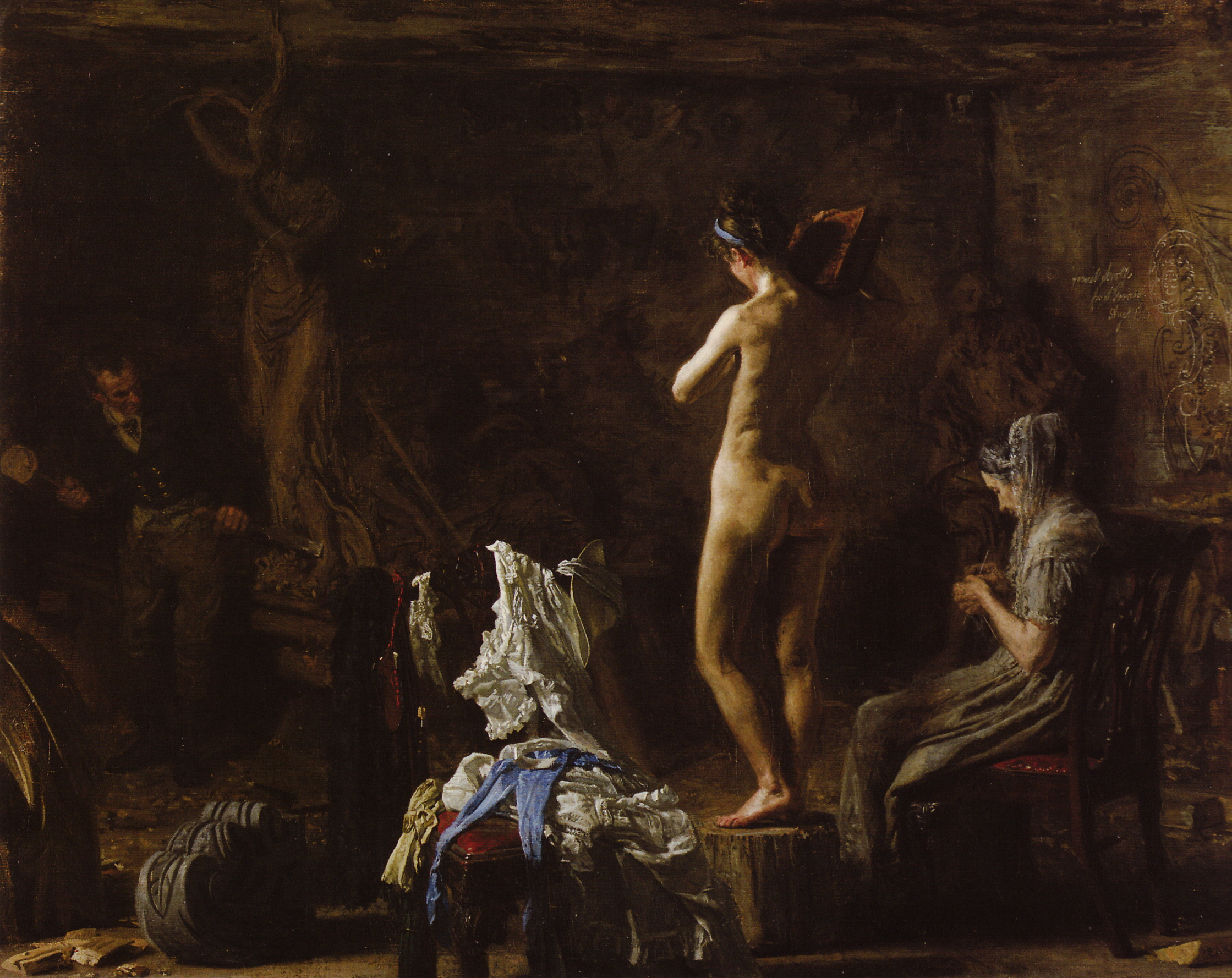
G-109. William Rush Carving His Allegorical Figure of the Schuylkill River (1876–77), Oil on canvas, 51.1 cm x 66.3 cm (20-1/8 in x 26-1/8 in), Philadelphia Museum of Art.

William Rush and His Model is the collective name given to several paintings by the American artist Thomas Eakins, one set from 1876–77 and the other from 1908. These works depict the American wood sculptor William Rush in 1808, carving his statue Water Nymph and Bittern for a fountain at Philadelphia's first waterworks. The water nymph is an allegorical figure representing the Schuylkill River, which provided the city's drinking water, and on her shoulder is a bittern, a native waterbird related to the heron. Hence, these Eakins works are also known as William Rush Carving His Allegorical Figure of the Schuylkill River.

== Nymph and Bittern ==
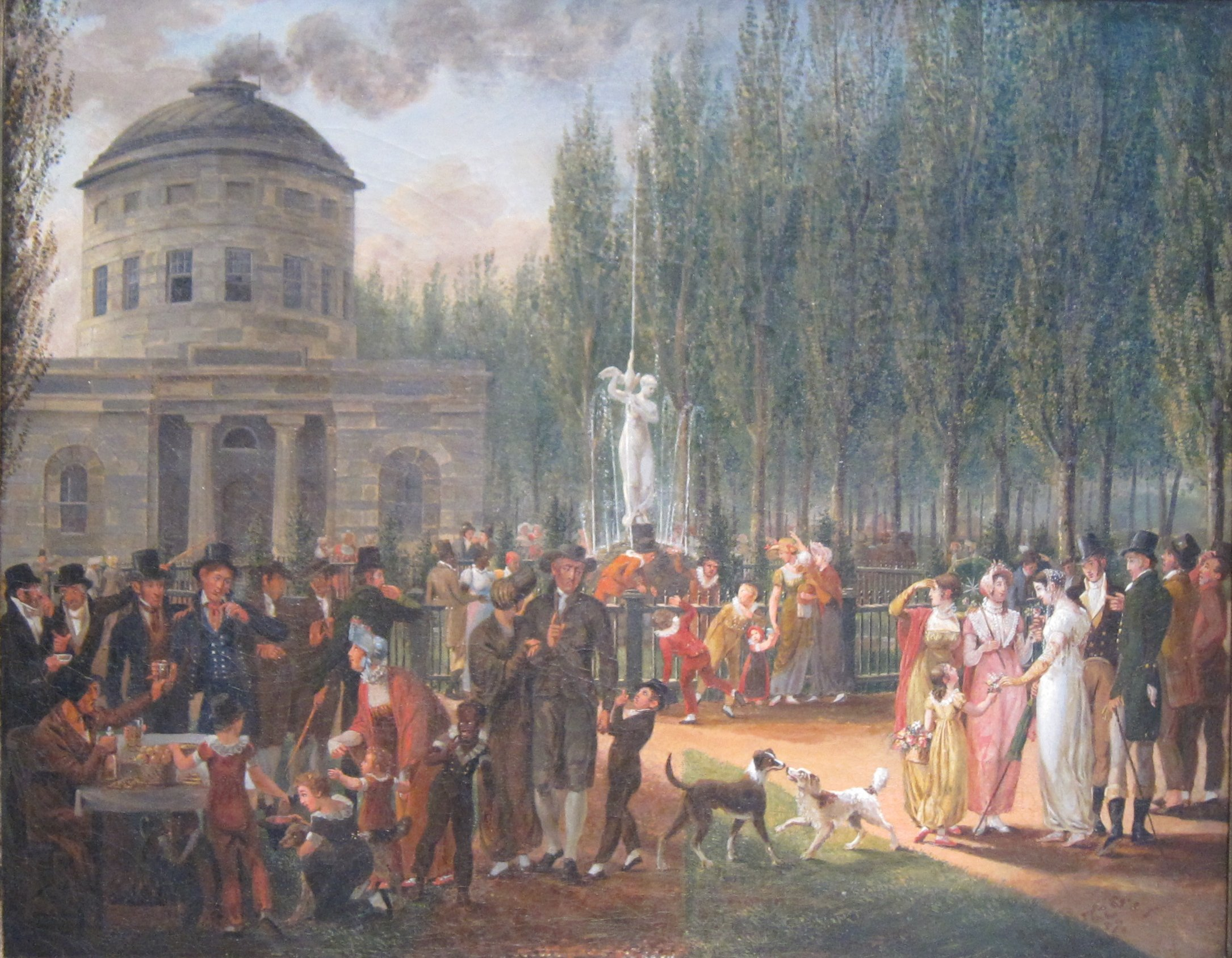
Fourth of July Celebration in Centre Square (c. 1812), by John Lewis Krimmel

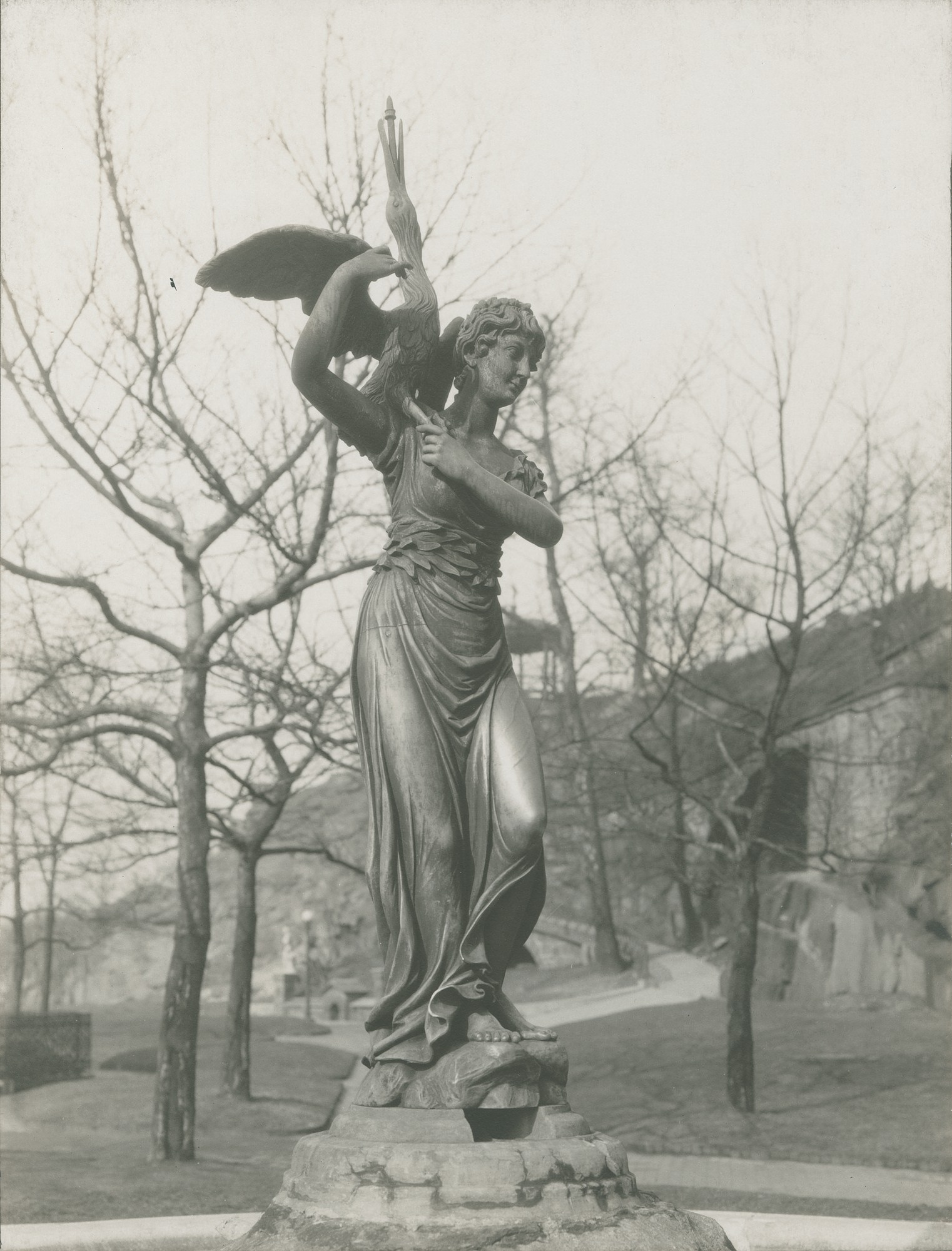
The bronze copy of Nymph and Bittern (cast 1872), in the 1930s

Philadelphia's first waterworks was located at Centre Square, now the site of Philadelphia City Hall. Steam engines drew drinking water from the Schuylkill River and pumped it up to tanks in the engine house tower, from which it was distributed by gravity through underground mains to the city. Rush, a carver of ship figureheads, was commissioned in 1808 to carve an allegorical statue to be the centerpiece of an ornamental fountain. His pine statue was painted white to imitate marble, and its water jet gushed from the mouth of the bittern held atop the nymph's shoulder. Art historian Elizabeth Milroy notes that the nymph's pose recalls the Venus de' Medici, a copy of which was owned by a Philadelphia painter. Local legend tells that the daughter of a Watering Committee member posed as Rush's model. When the Centre Square waterworks was demolished in 1829, the statue was relocated to a fountain at the nearby Fairmount Waterworks.

Following more than 60 years of exposure to water and the elements, Nymph and Bittern was stripped of its white paint in 1872, and a bronze copy was cast. The copy became the centerpiece of a new fountain at Fairmount, and the rotting original was placed in storage.

== Eakins and Rush ==
Eakins's interest in William Rush originated from a desire to restore Rush's name to prominence in the history of American art. Eakins taught at the Pennsylvania Academy of the Fine Arts, of which Rush had been a founder. Eakins was a strong believer in teaching human anatomy, and insisted that his students study from nude models. Since it is unlikely that Rush had employed a nude model for his sculpture of a draped water nymph, the painting may be viewed as Eakins's demonstration of the importance of studying anatomy from nudes.

Eakins was able to study both versions of the statue, and his notes document the deteriorated condition of the wooden original. Only its head survives, in the collection of the Pennsylvania Academy of the Fine Arts. The 1872 bronze copy is in the collection of the Philadelphia Museum of Art.

== 1876–77 versions ==
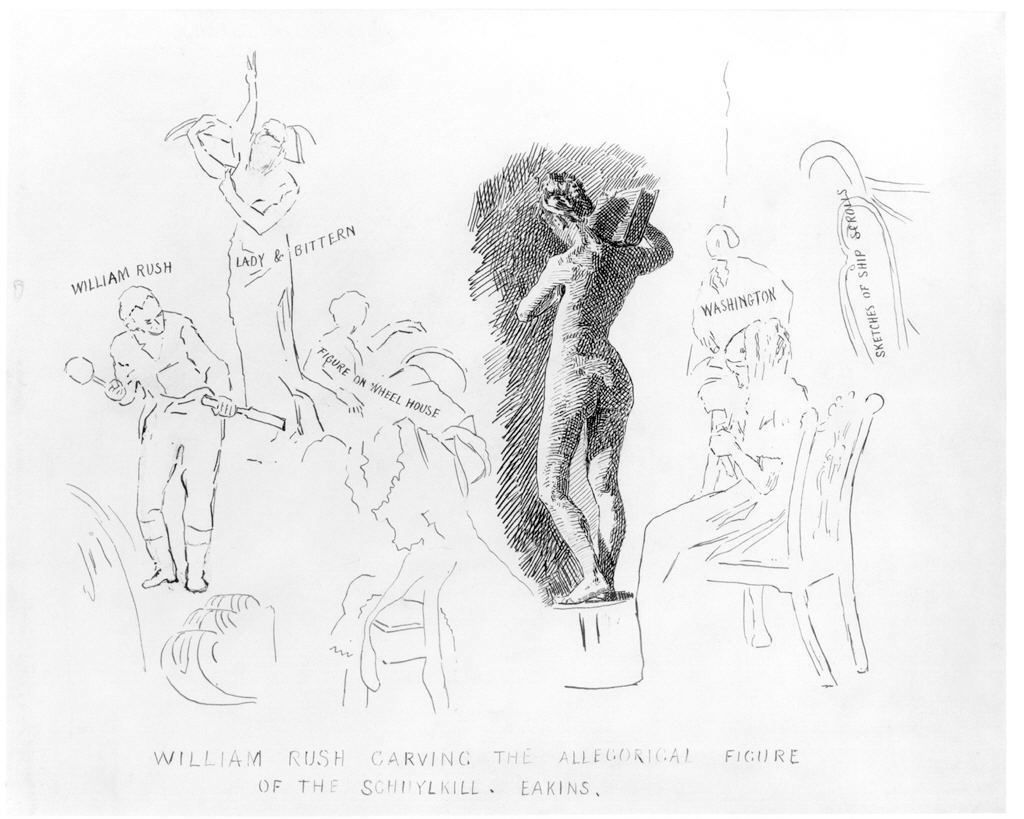
Key to G-109. Drawn by Eakins for an 1881 exhibition catalogue. Hirshhorn Museum.

As part of his process of creating the painting, Eakins carved wax studies of the nymph, her head, Rush's head, the nude model, and the other Rush sculptures depicted. Five of the six wax studies survive, in the collection of the Philadelphia Museum of Art (PMA).

=== Studies ===
At Yale University Art Gallery is what appears to be an abandoned version of the painting (G-111), presumed to pre-date the finished version at PMA. This is sometimes called a study, but it is almost the same size as the finished version, contains the same figures (although the chaperone faces a different direction), and was never displayed during Eakins's lifetime.

At the Farnsworth Art Museum in Rockland, Maine, is an oil study for another composition (G-110). The model stands on a higher pedestal, and the chaperone has been placed between the model and Rush. Judging from a photograph in a 1938 auction catalogue, G-110 seems to be cut down from a larger study.

=== Finished version ===
The finished version of William Rush and His Model (G-109, Philadelphia Museum of Art) has the model slightly rotated, and the chaperone to the model's right, facing Rush. In the foreground, between Rush and the model, stands a chair conspicuously displaying the model's clothes. Rush's life-sized figure of George Washington (1815), and his Allegorical Figure of The Waterworks (1825)—a reclining female figure manipulating a waterwheel—are visible in the background. Although the painting is historically inaccurate—Rush carved Water Nymph and Bittern in 1808, and the other statues years later—Eakins's intent seems to have been to present a survey of the sculptor's whole career.

The painting was first exhibited in January 1878 at the Boston Art Club, and later that year at the Society of American Artists in New York. It immediately sparked controversy with one New York reviewer writing, "What ruins the picture is much less the want of beauty in the model ... than the presence in the foreground of the clothes of that young woman, cast carelessly over a chair. This gives the shock which makes one think about the nudity—and at once the picture becomes improper."

=== Sketches and preparatory studies ===
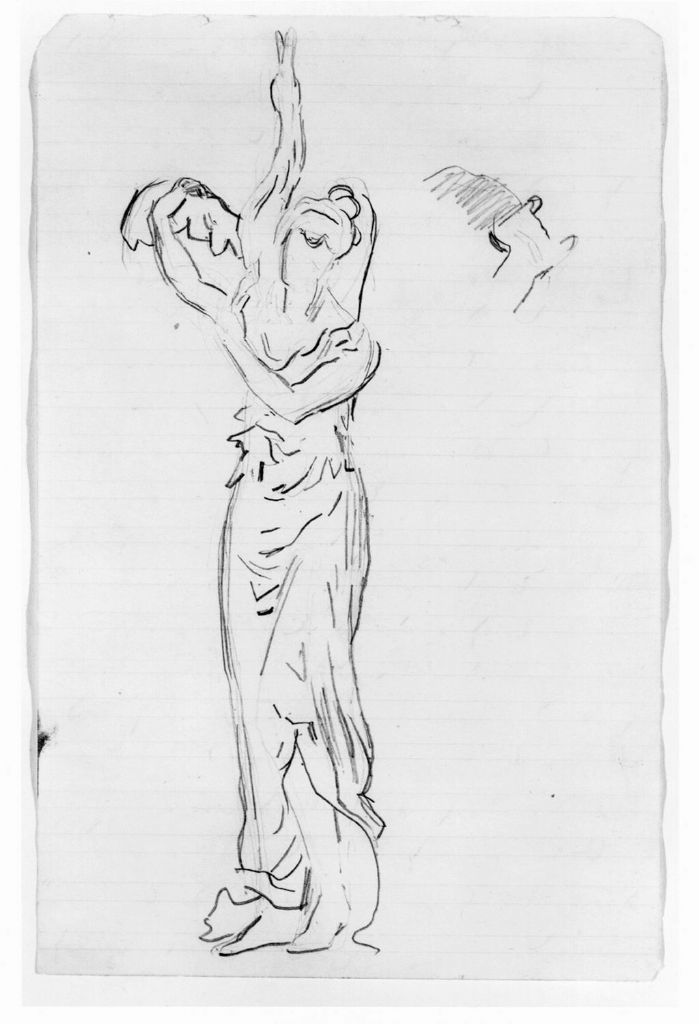
Sketch of Water Nymph and Bittern (1876), Hirshhorn Museum

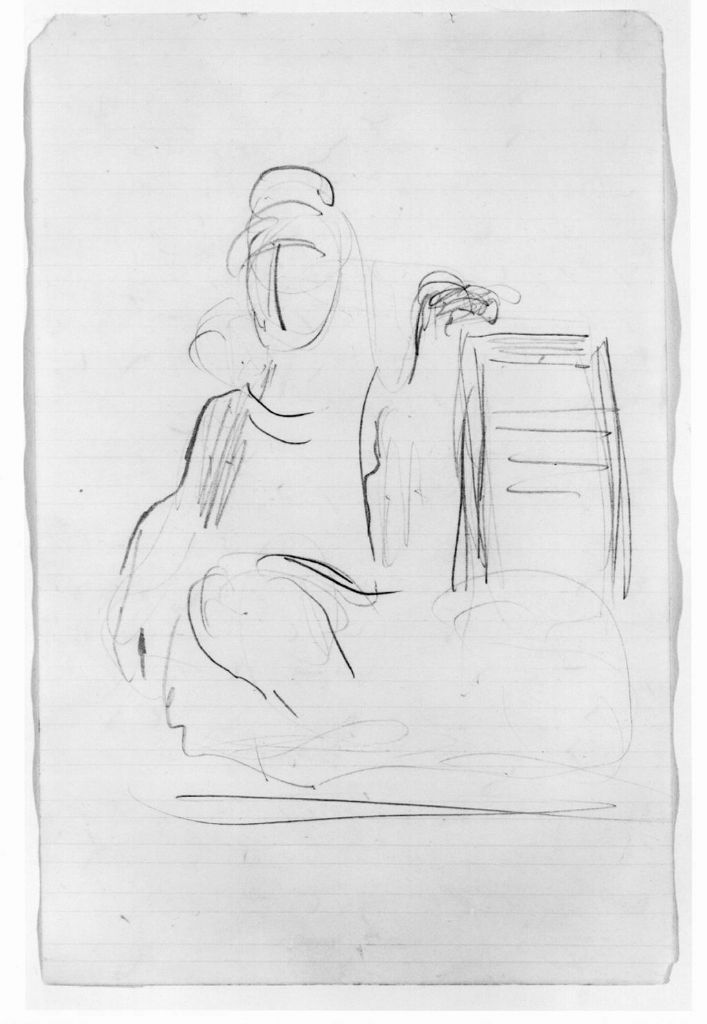
Sketch of The Waterworks (1876), Hirshhorn Museum

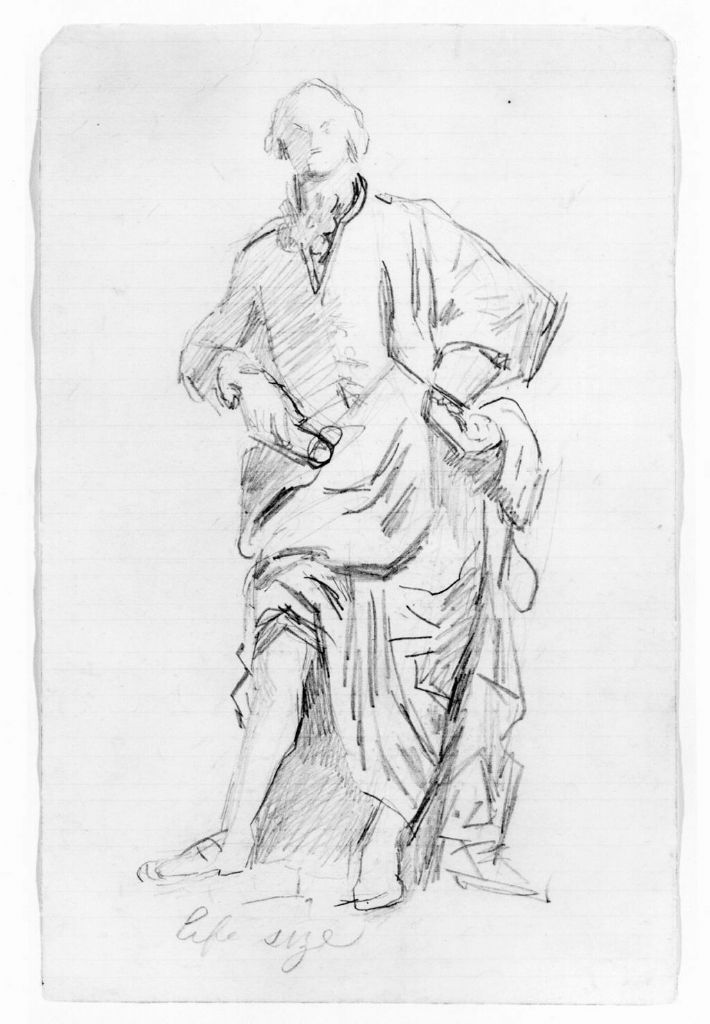
Sketch of George Washington (1876), Hirshhorn Museum

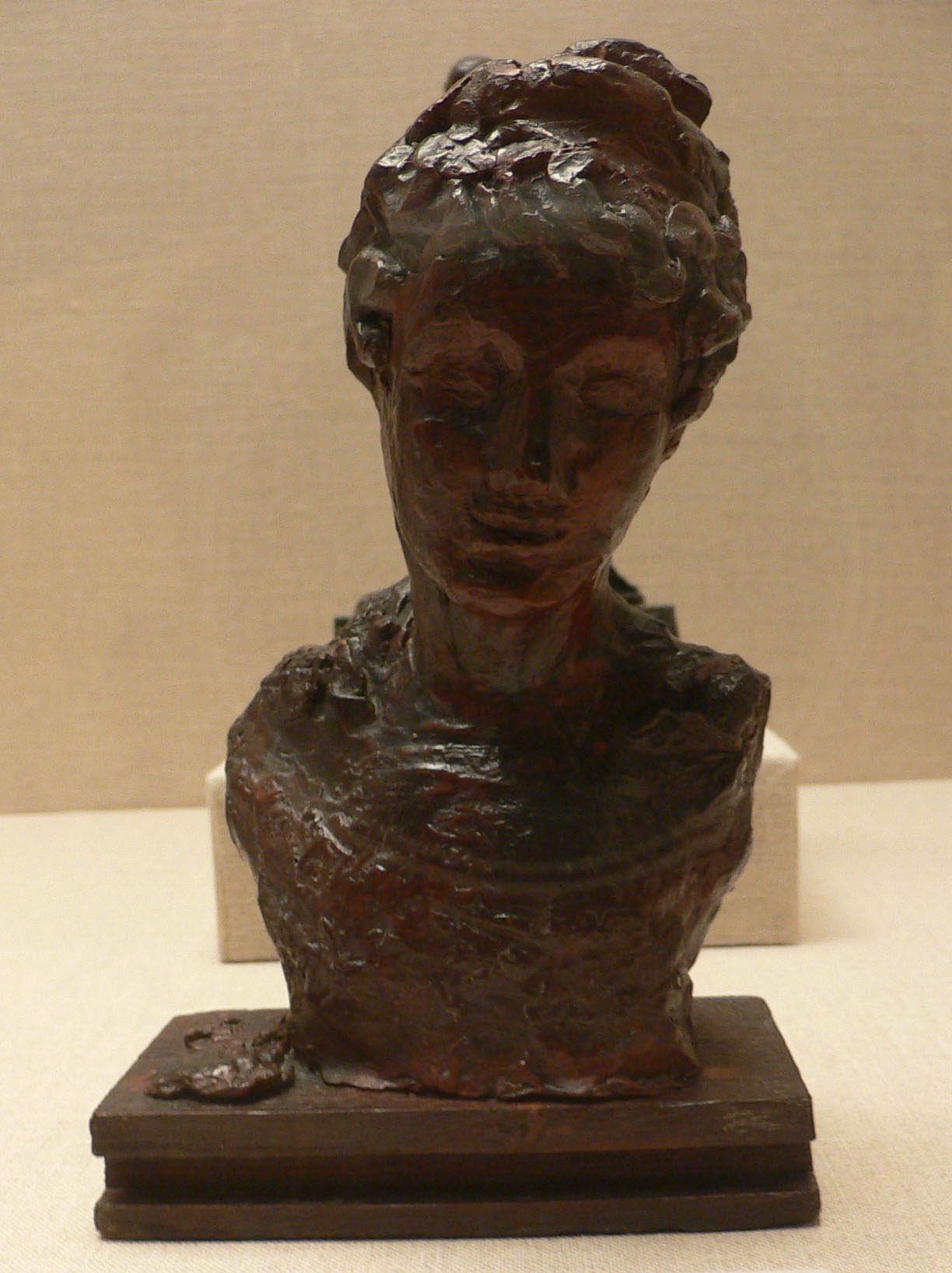
Wax study of the Nymph's head (1876), Philadelphia Museum of Art

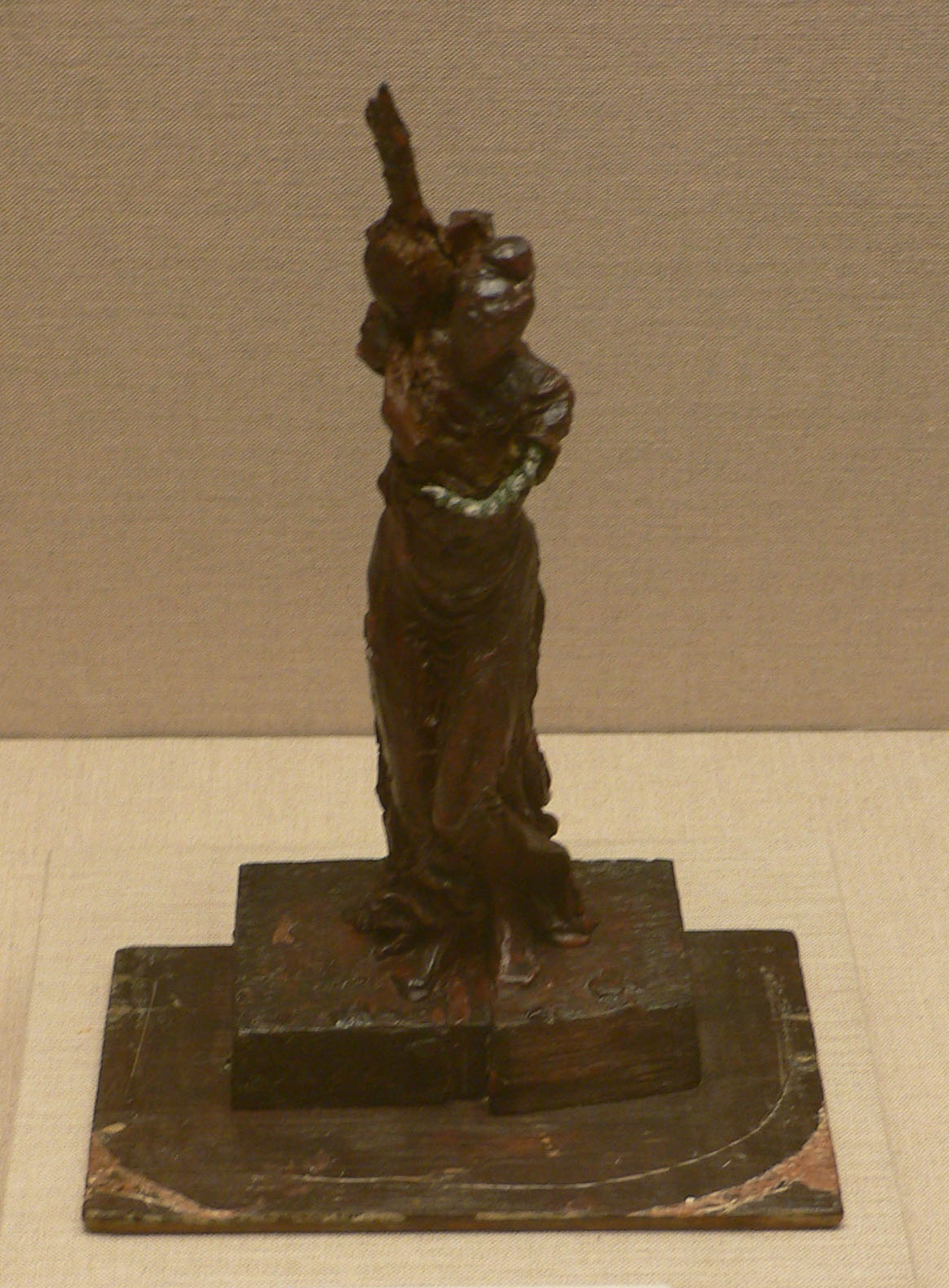
Wax study of Water Nymph and Bittern (1876), Philadelphia Museum of Art

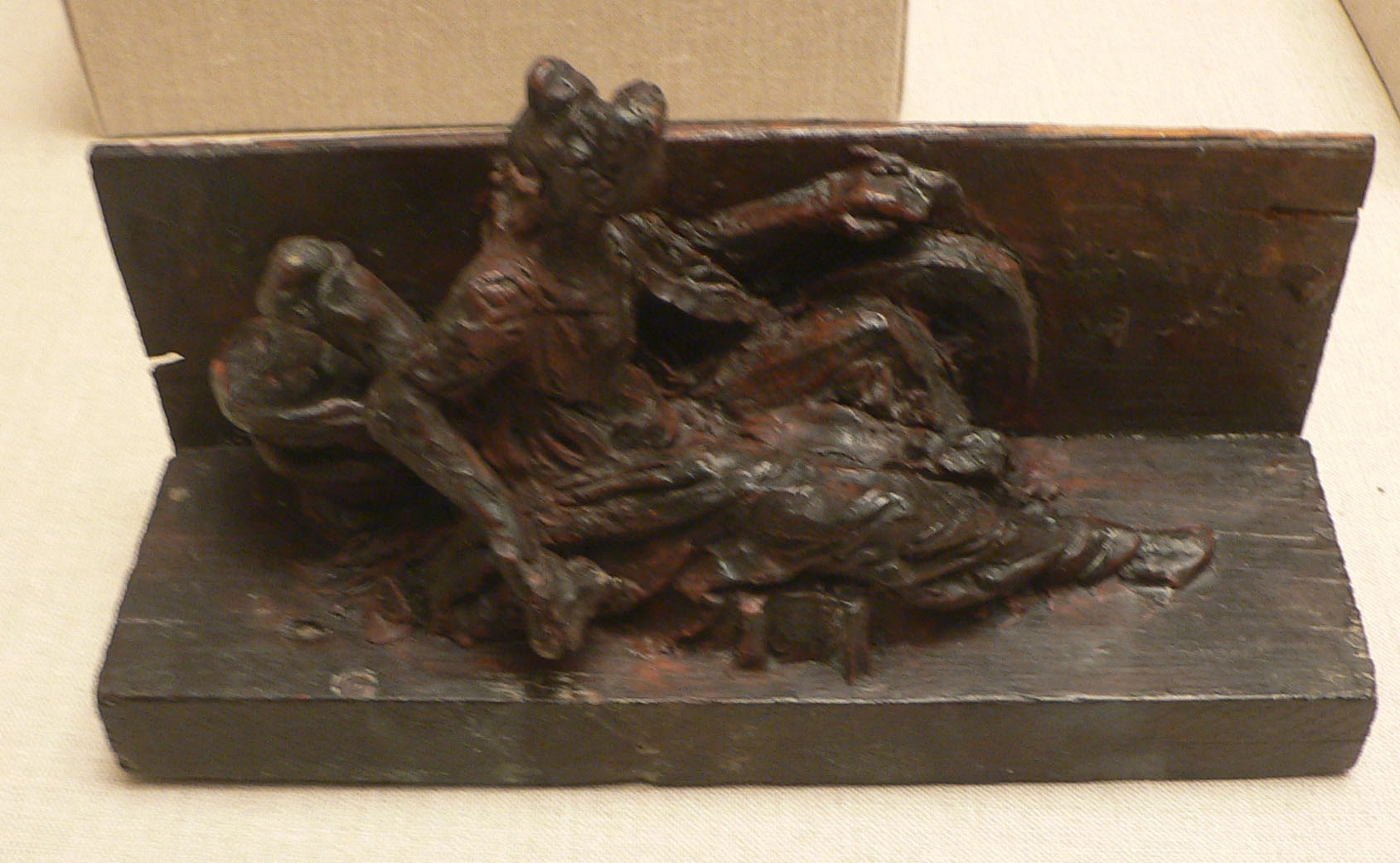
Wax study of The Waterworks (1876), Philadelphia Museum of Art

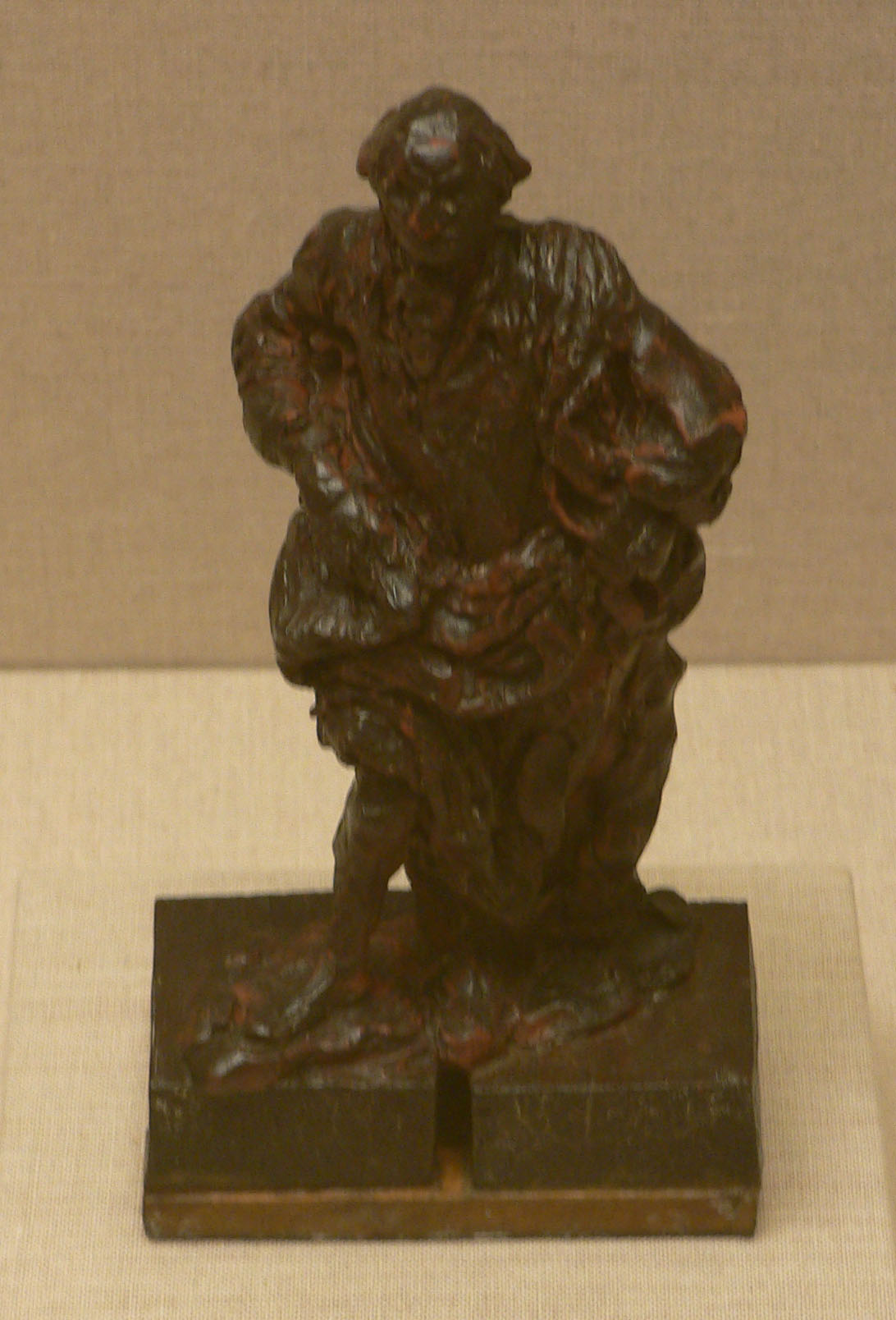
Wax study of George Washington (1876), Philadelphia Museum of Art

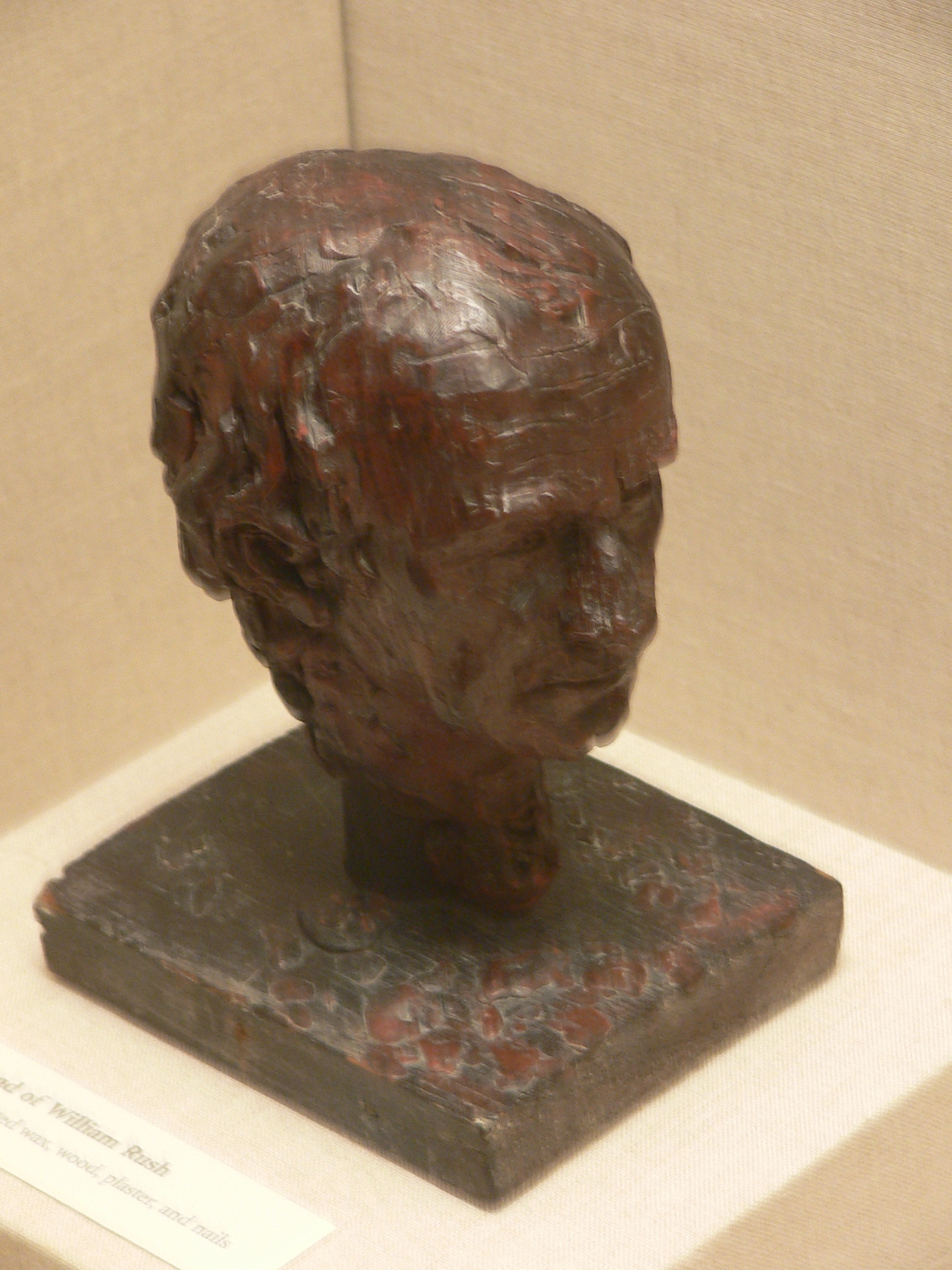
Wax study of Rush's head (1876), Philadelphia Museum of Art. Based on Rush's self-portrait bust at the Pennsylvania Academy of the Fine Arts.

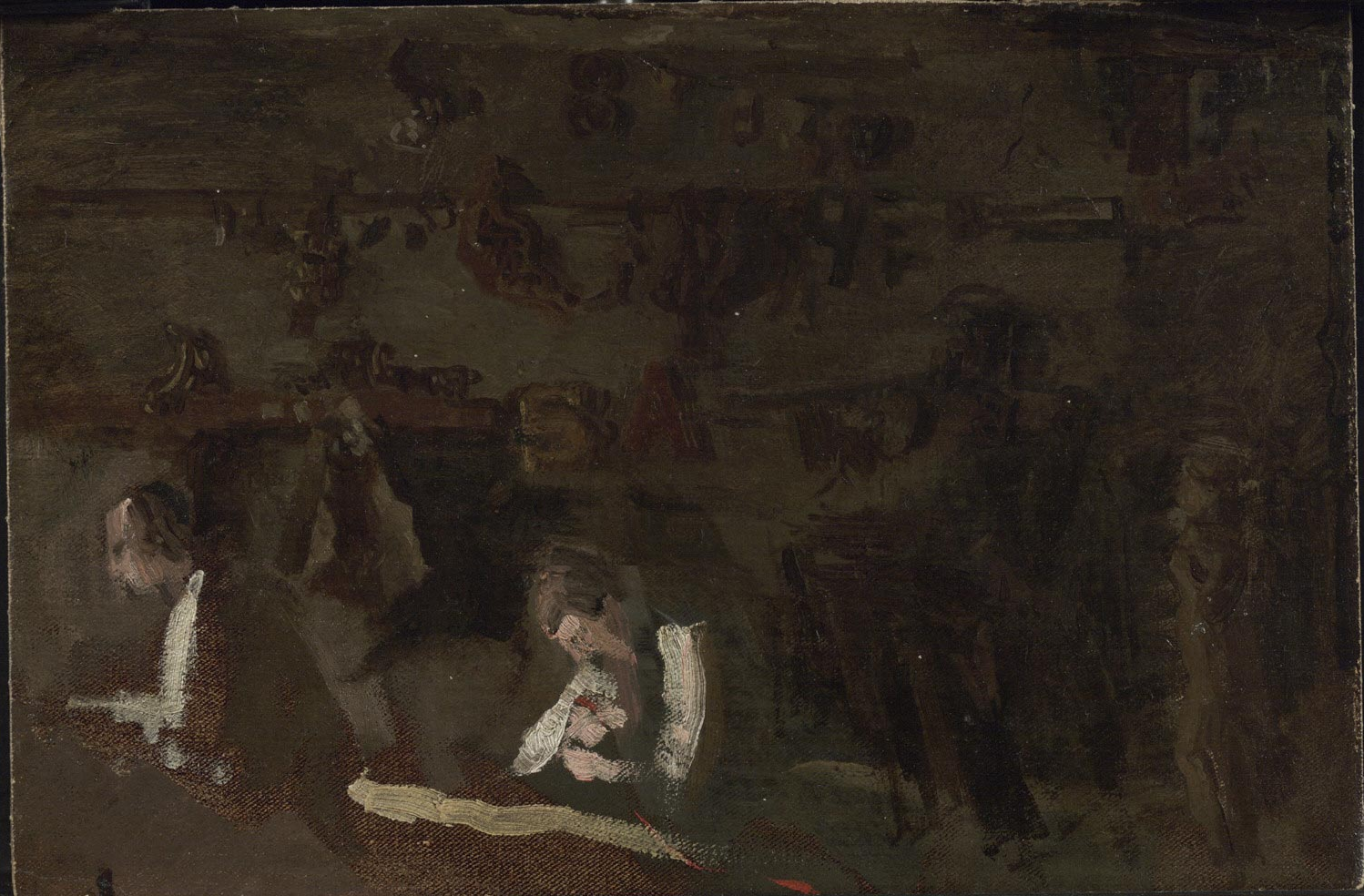
G-112. Sketch of the interior of William Rush's shop (1876–77), Philadelphia Museum of Art

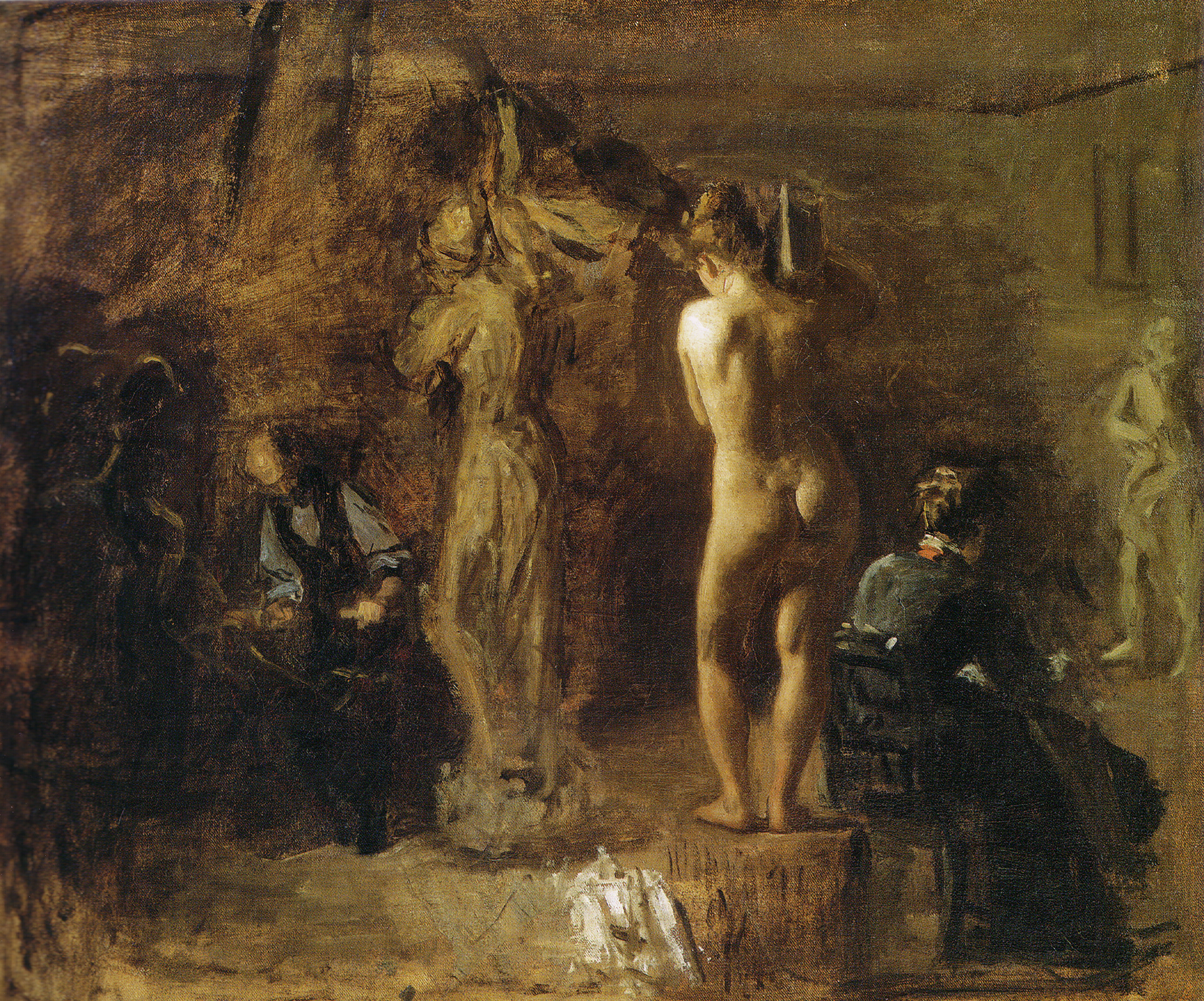
G-111. Unfinished alternate version or study for G-109 (1876), Yale University Art Gallery

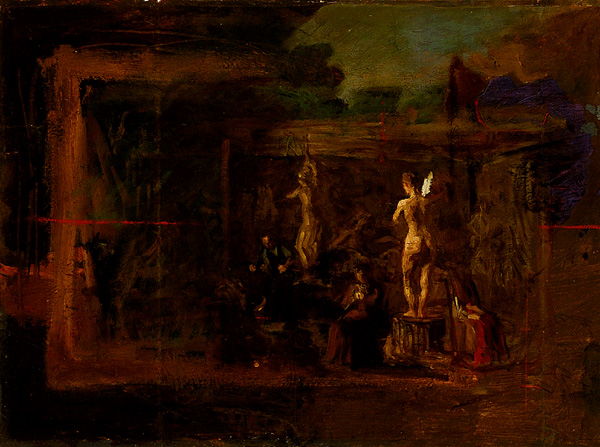
G-110. Compositional study (circa 1877), Farnsworth Art Museum. This seems to be cut down from a larger study.

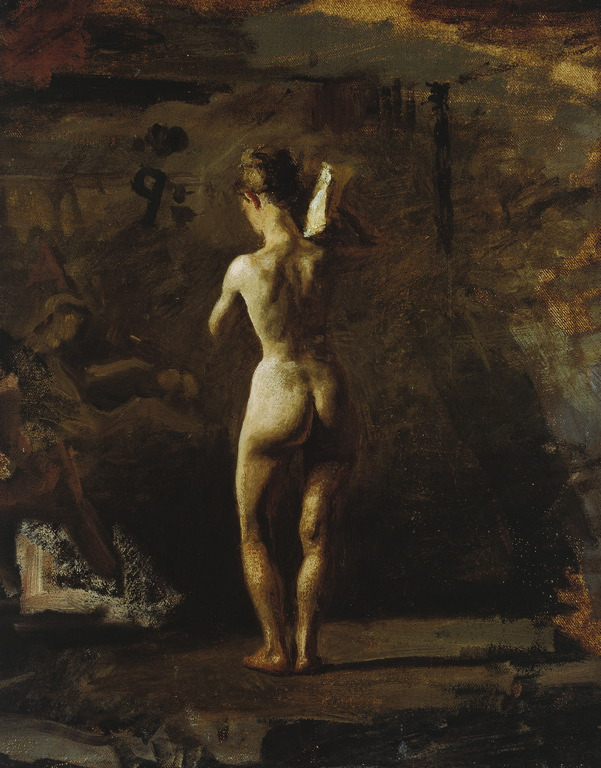
G-113. Study for G-110 or G-109 (1876), Art Institute of Chicago

== 1908 versions ==
For unspecified reasons—possibly related to the statue's approaching centennial—Eakins returned to this subject in 1908. His first 1908 version (G-445, now in the Brooklyn Museum) is similar to the PMA version, however, Rush and his statue have been moved to the far right, the chaperone is to the model's left, facing the viewer, and the pile of the model's clothes has been eliminated. This is the least successful composition, with little visual connection between Rush and the model.

The second 1908 version (G-451, in the Honolulu Museum of Art) shows a frontal view of the nude model descending the platform. She is neither idealized nor sentimentalized. Rush is now out of the shadows and holding the model's hand as if helping a grand lady descend from a carriage. The chaperone and background sculptures are omitted from this version. The figure of Rush may be a self-portrait by Eakins.

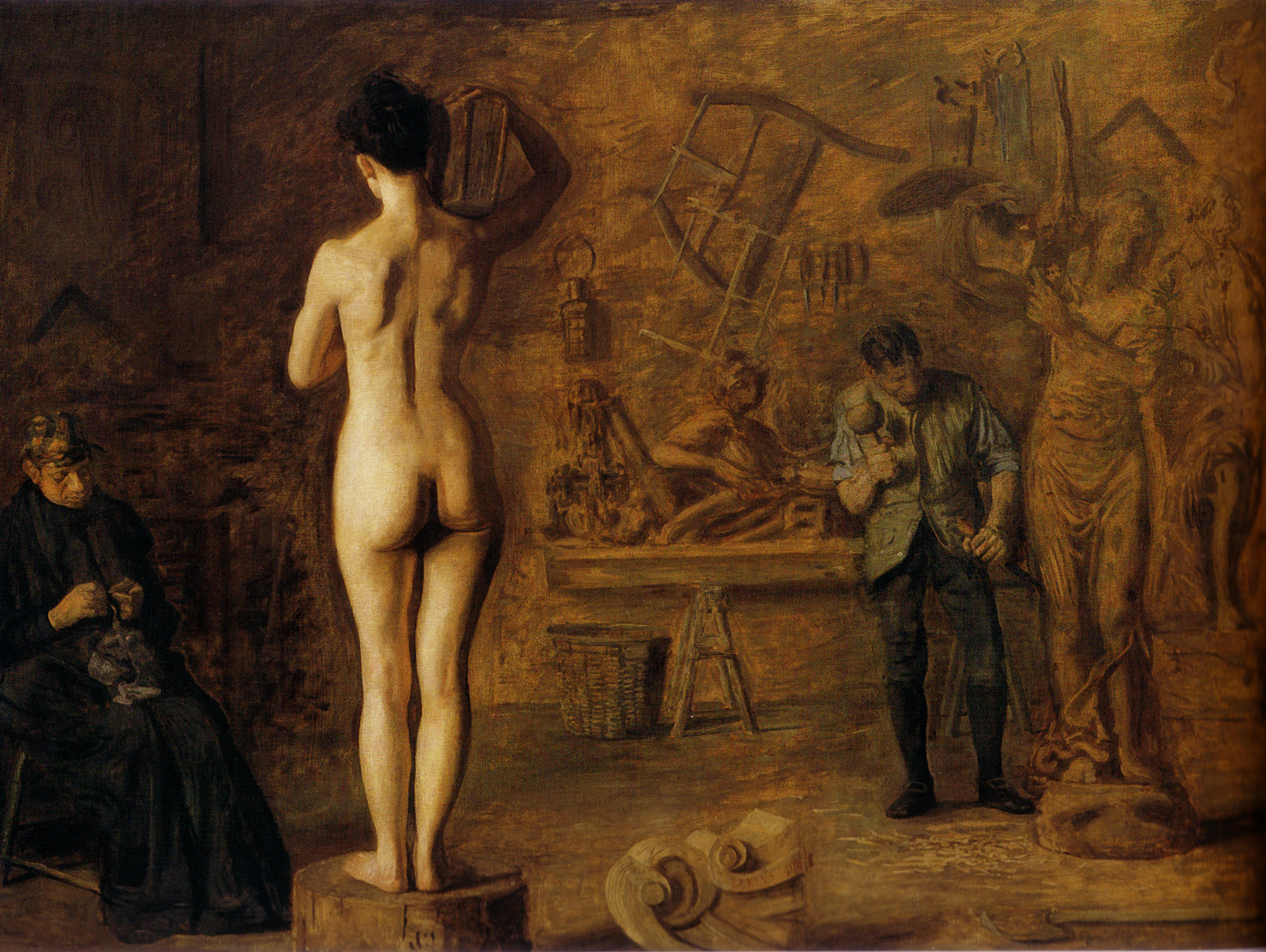
G-445. 1908, Brooklyn Museum

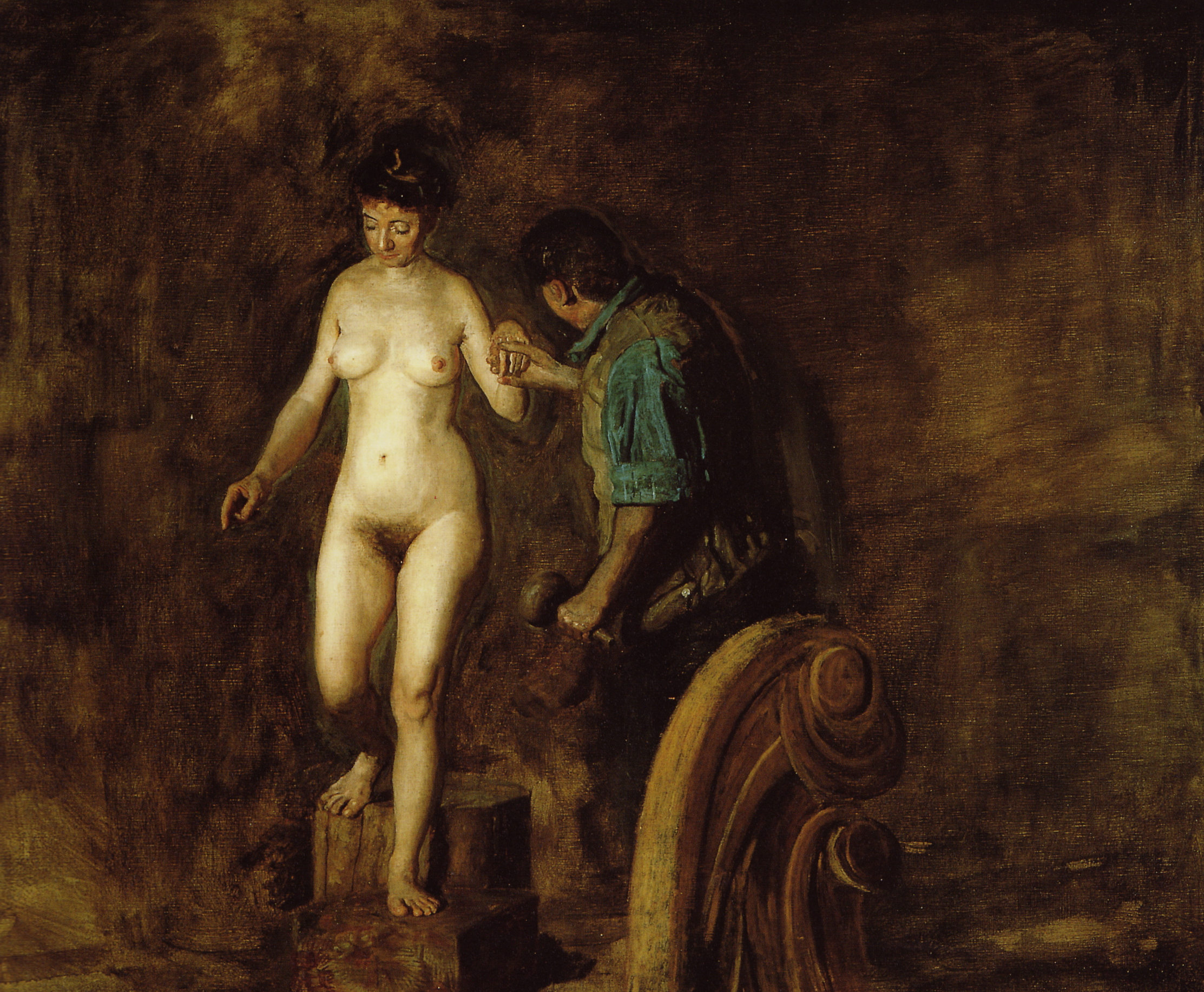
G-451. 1908, Honolulu Museum of Art

=== Preparatory studies ===
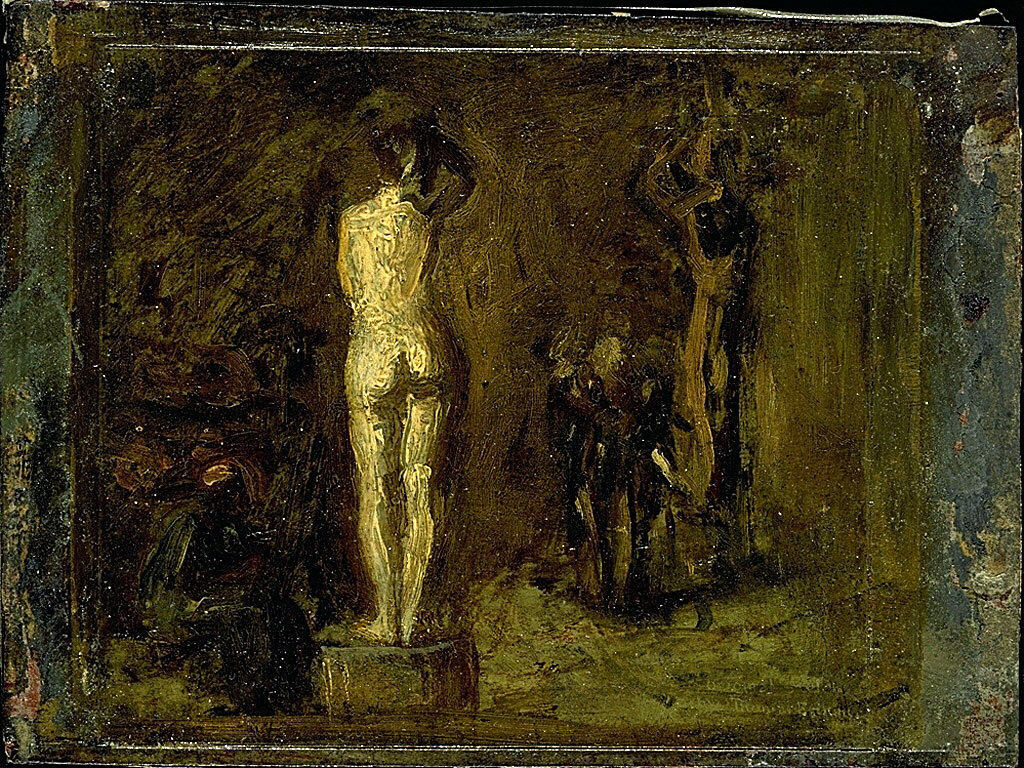
G-447. Sketch for G-445 (1908), Hirshhorn Museum

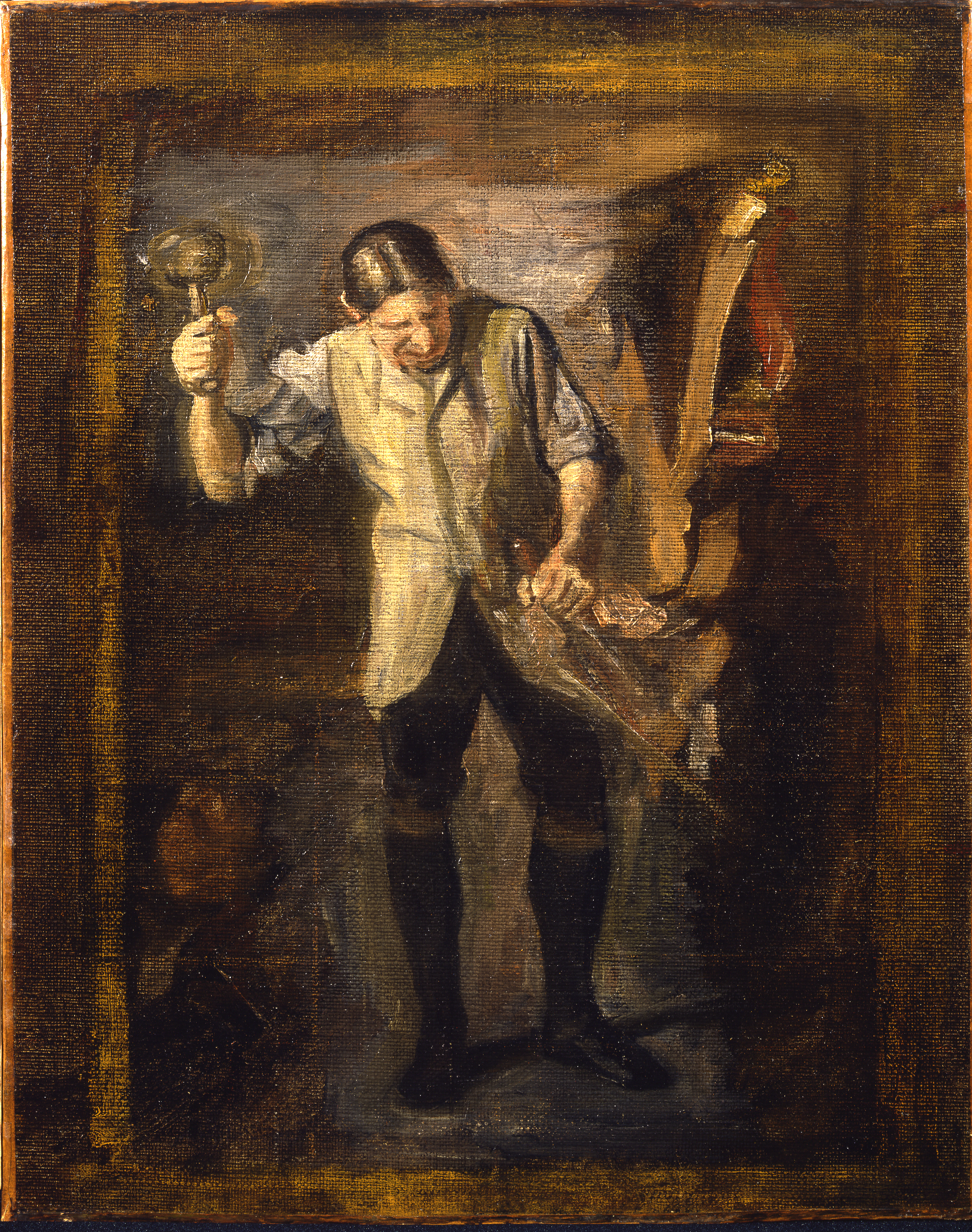
G-449. Study of Rush for G-445 (1908), private collection

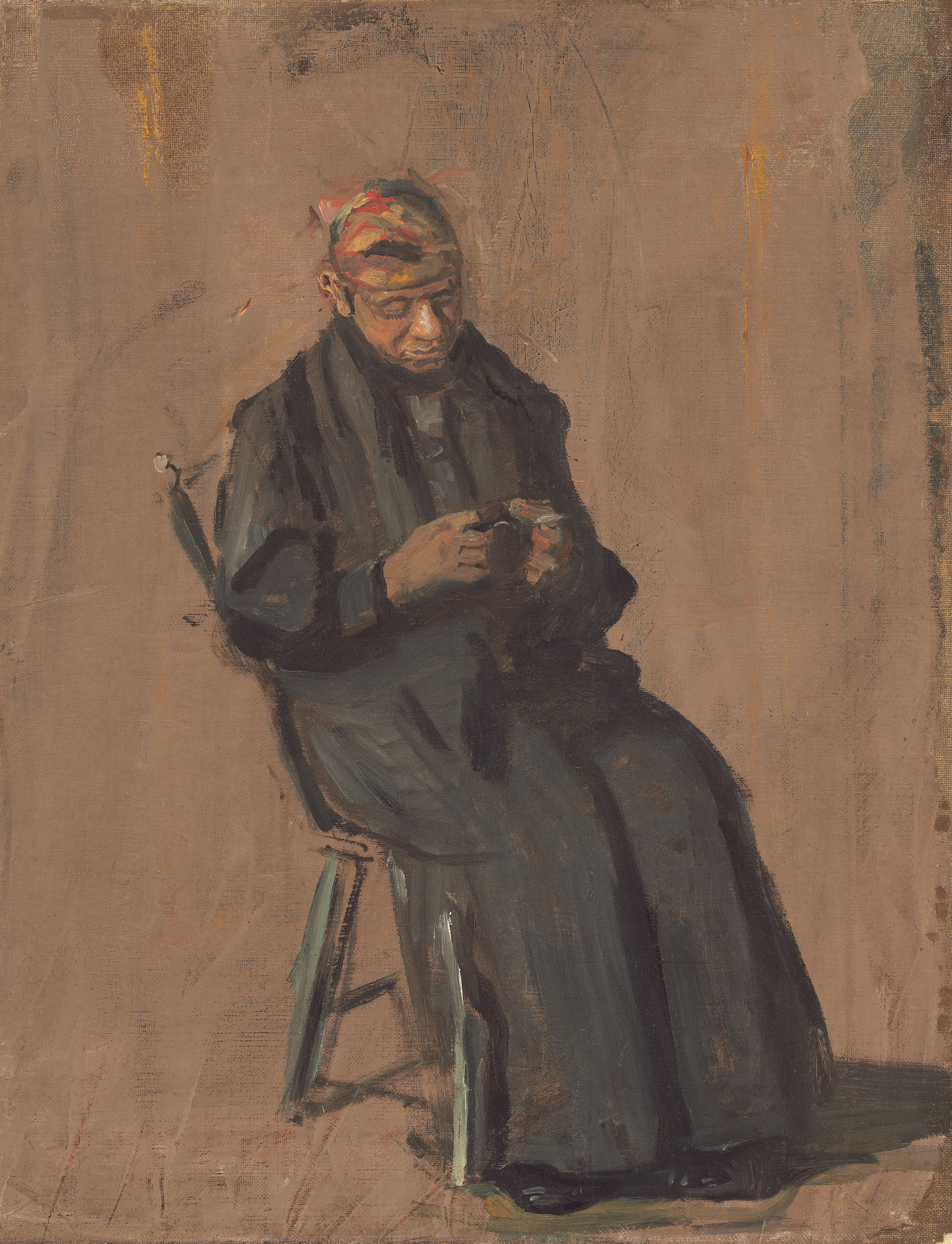
G-450. Study for G-445 (1908), National Gallery of Art

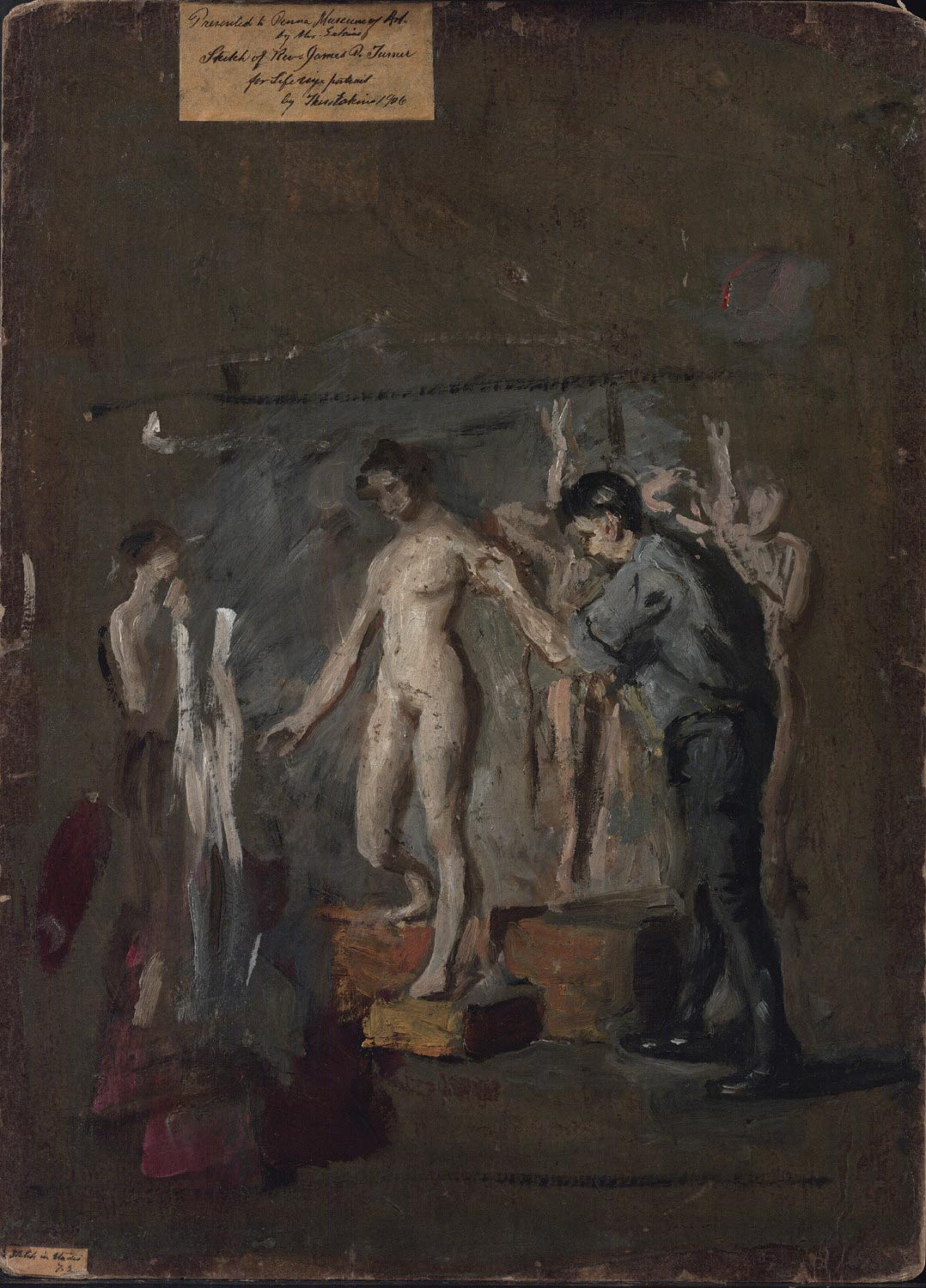
G-439 (verso). Sketch for G-451 (1908), Philadelphia Museum of Art

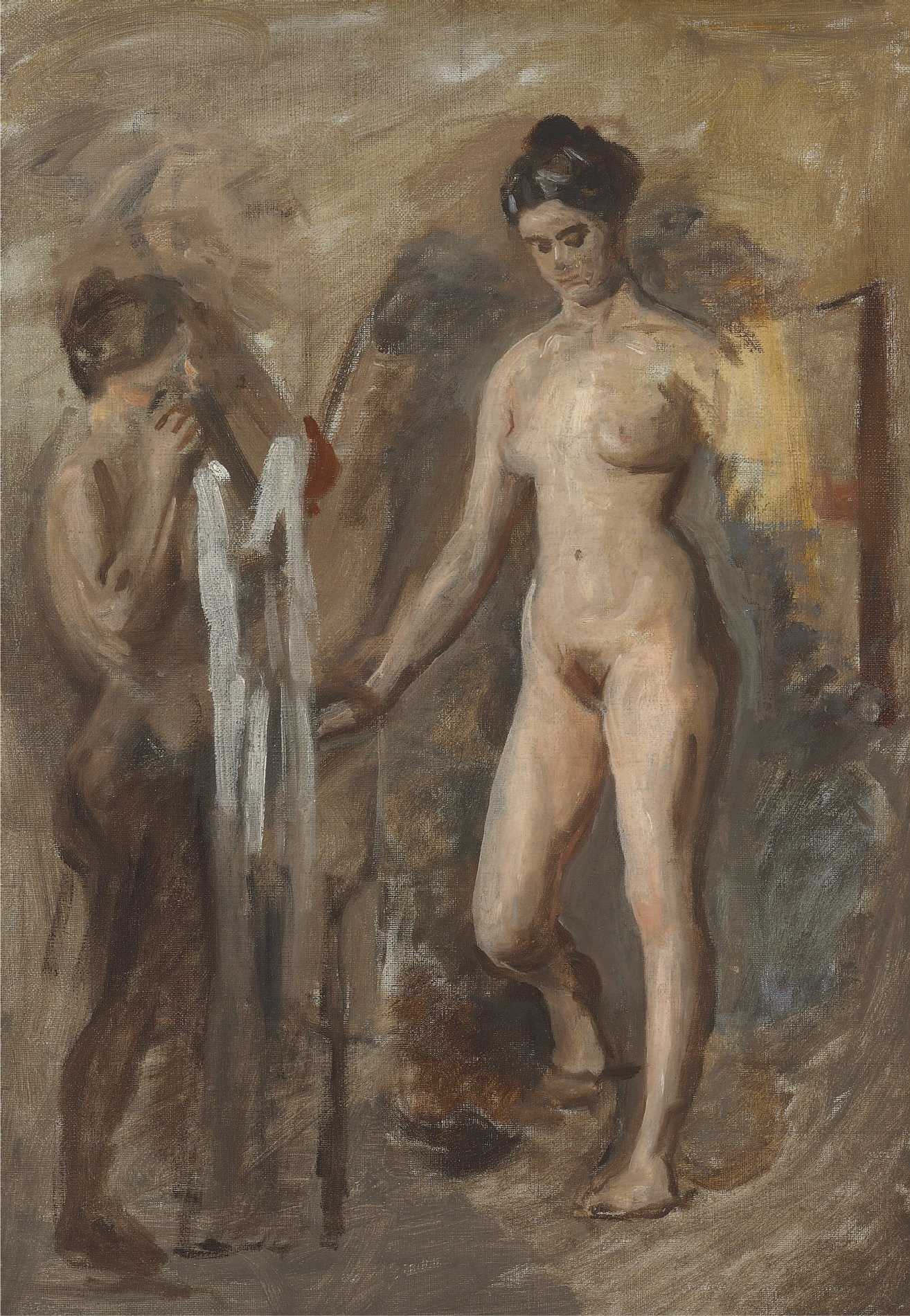
G-454. Study for G-451 (1908), Ex collection: Hirshhorn Museum

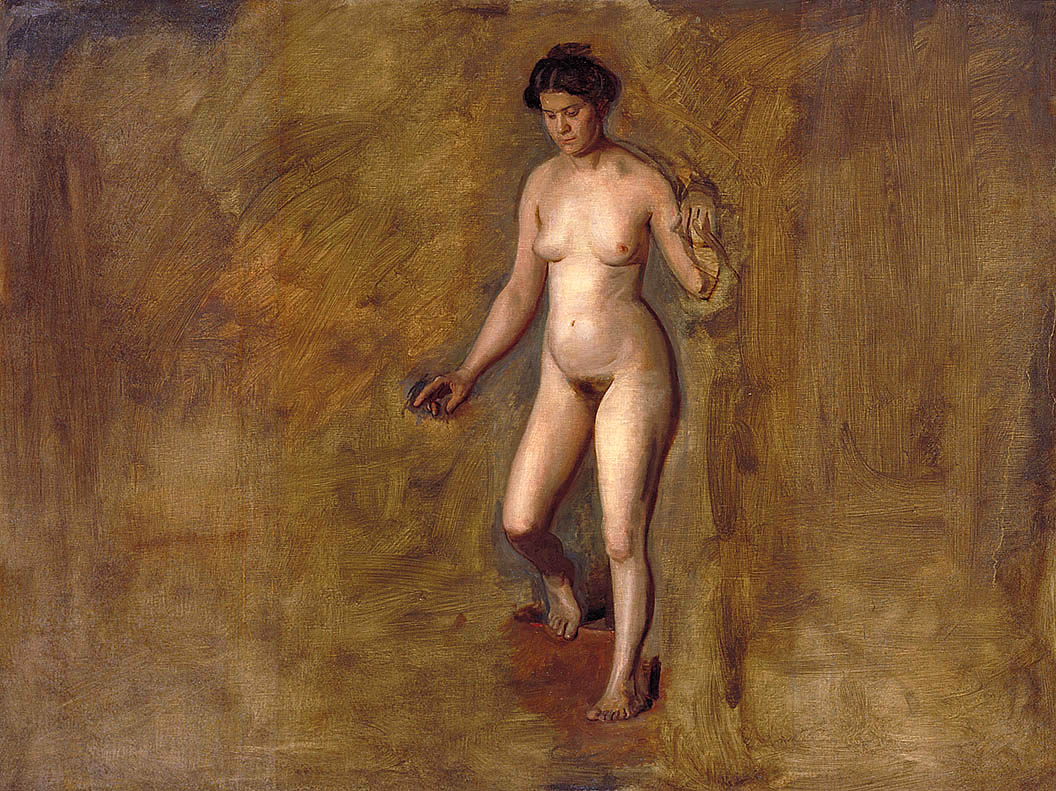
G-453. Study for G-451 (1908), Smithsonian American Art Museum

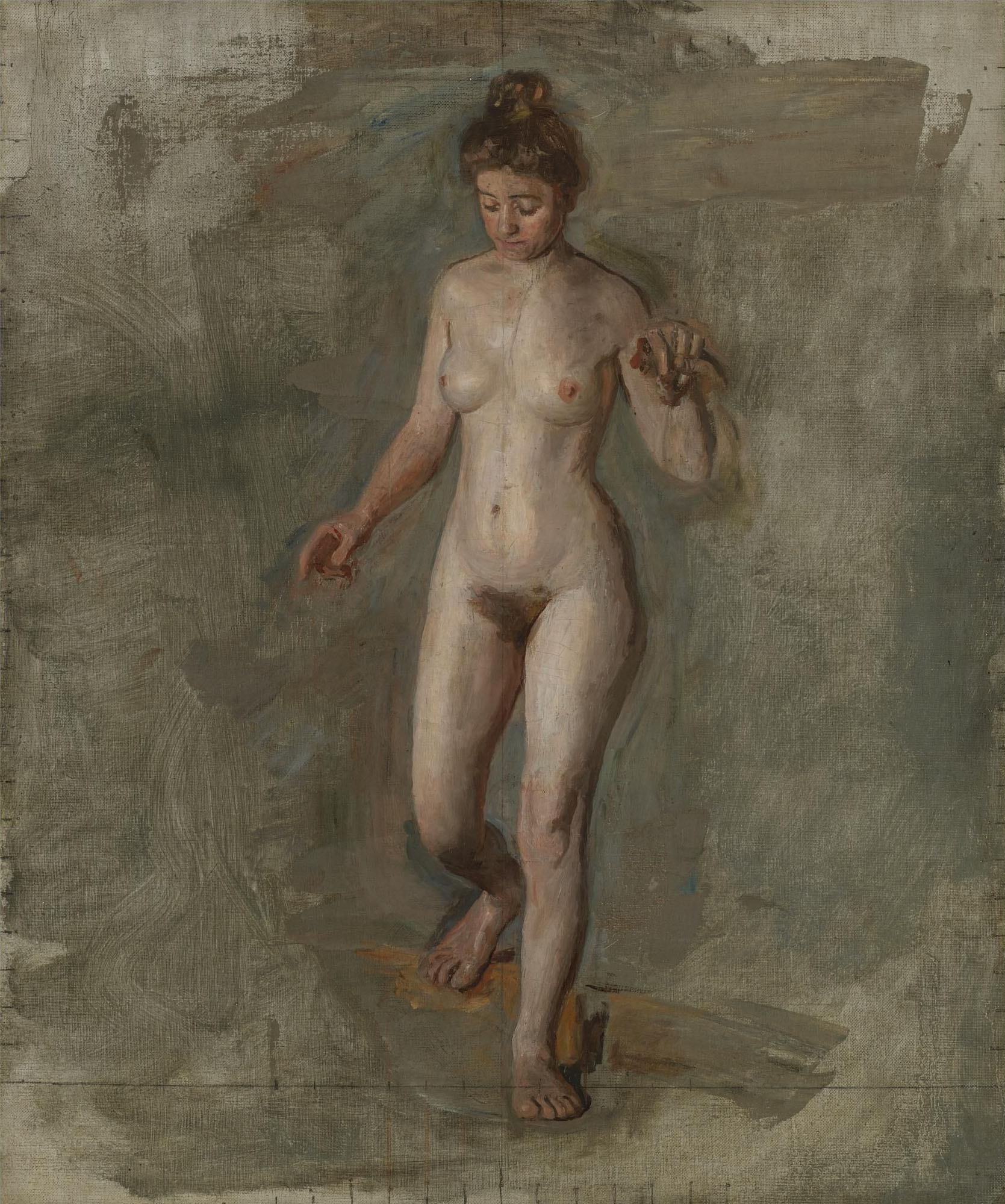
G-452. Study for G-451 (1908), private collection. Promised gift to Crystal Bridges Museum of American Art.

== See also ==
- List of works by Thomas Eakins
