= Statue of George Washington (Second Bank of the United States) =

1815 statue by William Rush in Philadelphia

George Washington
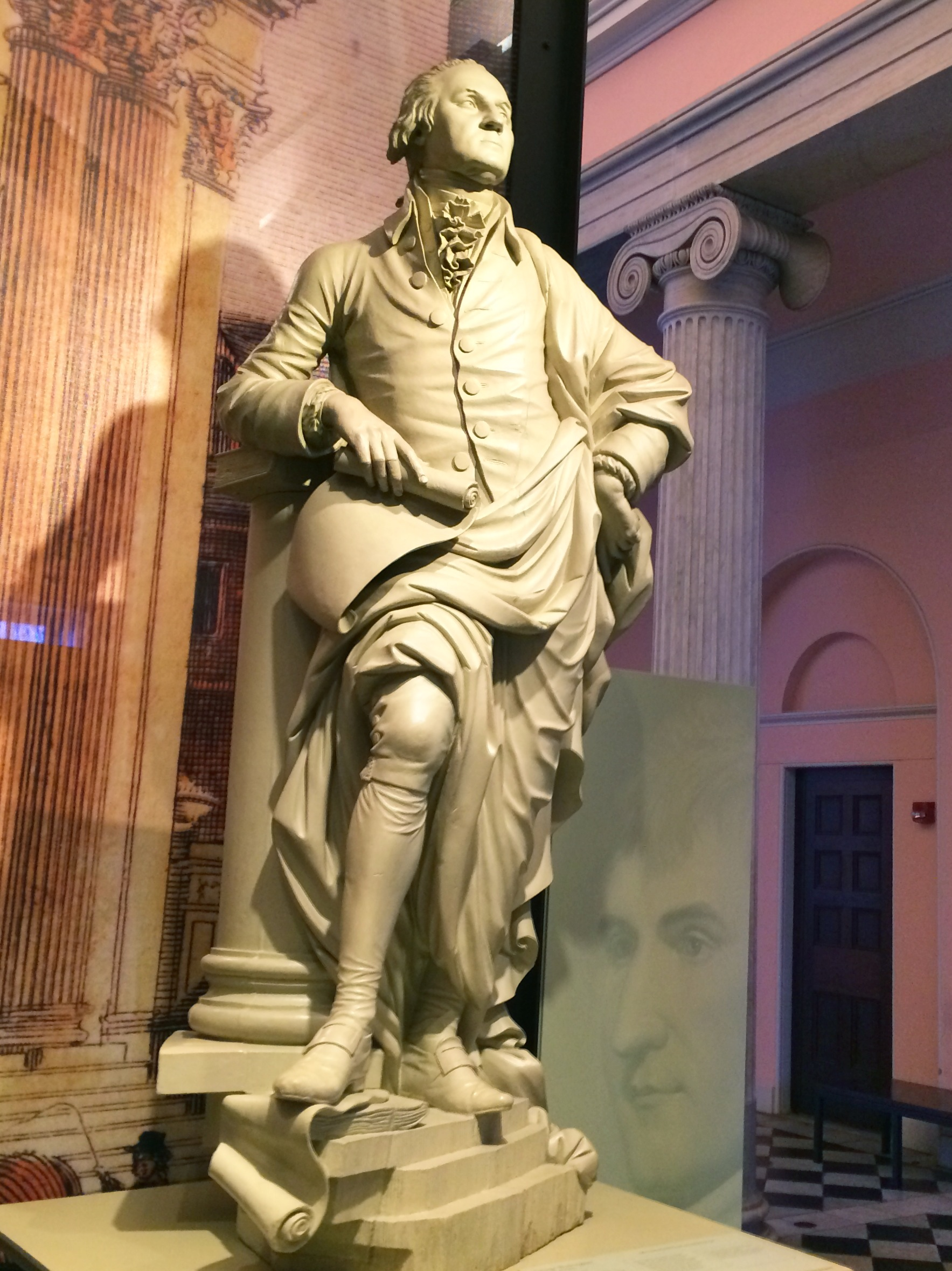
- George Washington by William Rush
- Artist: William Rush
- Year: 1815
- Medium: Painted wood
- Dimensions: 1.8 m (6 ft)
- Location: Second Bank of the United States Portrait Gallery; Philadelphia, Pennsylvania, United States; 39°56′55″N 75°8′54″W

George Washington is a life-size wooden statue by the American sculptor William Rush and located in the portrait gallery of the Second Bank of the United States in Philadelphia. It depicts George Washington in colonial dress and was initially displayed in 1815 at the Pennsylvania Academy of Fine Arts. It was relocated in 1824 to Independence Hall.

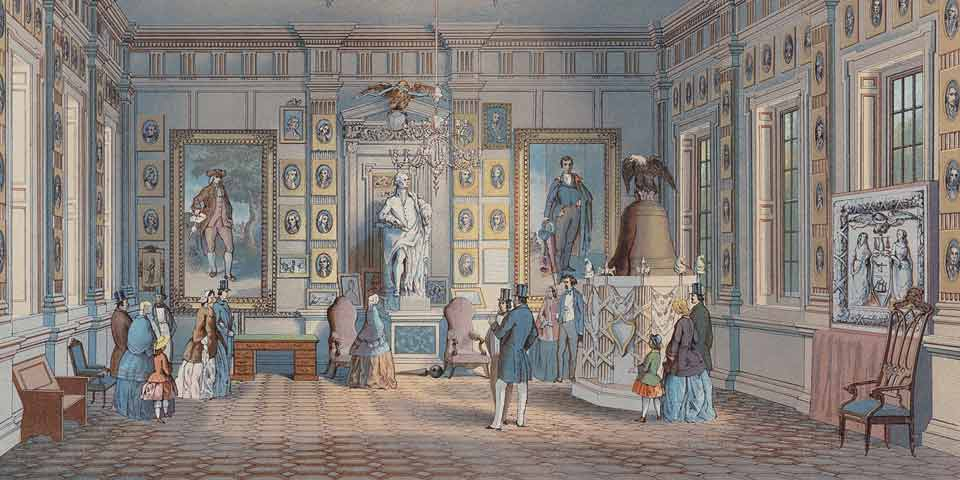
Chromolithograph showing statue in Independence Hall

== See also ==
- 1815 in art
- Cultural depictions of George Washington
- List of memorials to George Washington
- List of statues of George Washington
