= William Rush (sculptor) =

American sculptor (1756–1833)

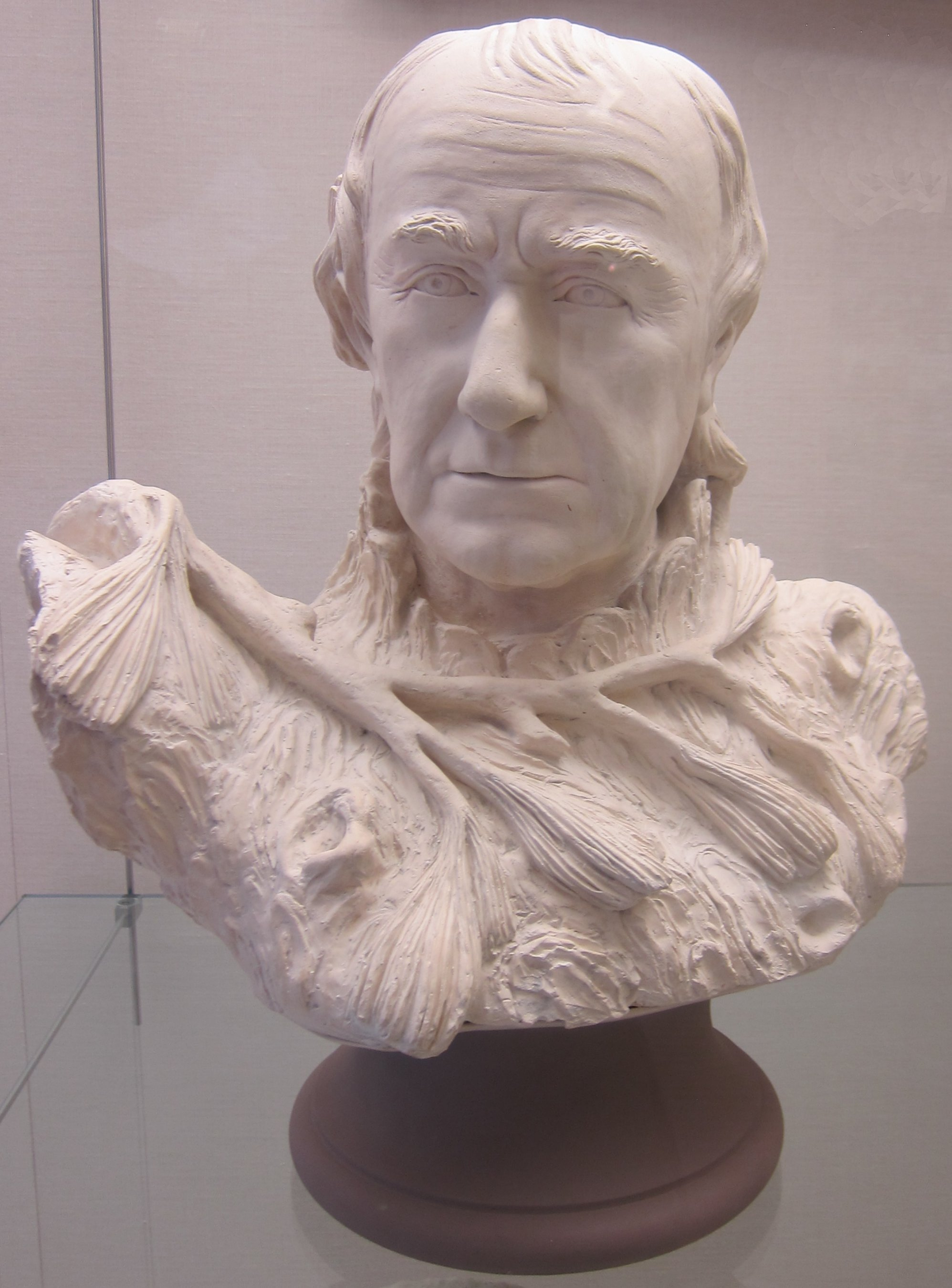
A self-portrait bust of Rush in 1822, now housed at the Pennsylvania Academy of the Fine Arts in Philadelphia

William Rush (July 4, 1756 – January 17, 1833) was a U.S. neoclassical sculptor from Philadelphia, Pennsylvania. He is considered the first major American sculptor.

== Early life and education ==
Rush was born in Philadelphia, the fourth child of Joseph Rush, a ship's carpenter, and first wife, Rebecca Lincoln. As a teenager, he apprenticed three years with woodcarver Edward Cutbush, and soon surpassed his master in the art of carving of ships' figureheads in wood.

== Career ==
=== Revolutionary War ===
Rush saw military service during the Revolutionary War as an officer in a patriot militia. He opened his own wood carving business, and was in great demand when the U.S. Navy began building ships in Philadelphia. Later in life, he took up sculpture. Rush was one of the founders of the Pennsylvania Academy of the Fine Arts in Philadelphia, and taught sculpture there. He was also active in local politics, serving on the Philadelphia City Council for two decades.

=== Sculpture ===
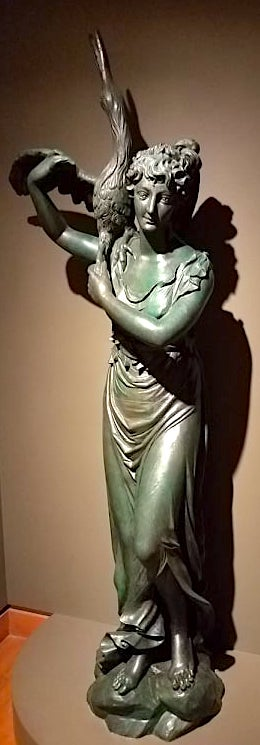
Bronze casting of Rush's allegory of the Schuylkill River, now in the Philadelphia Museum of Art

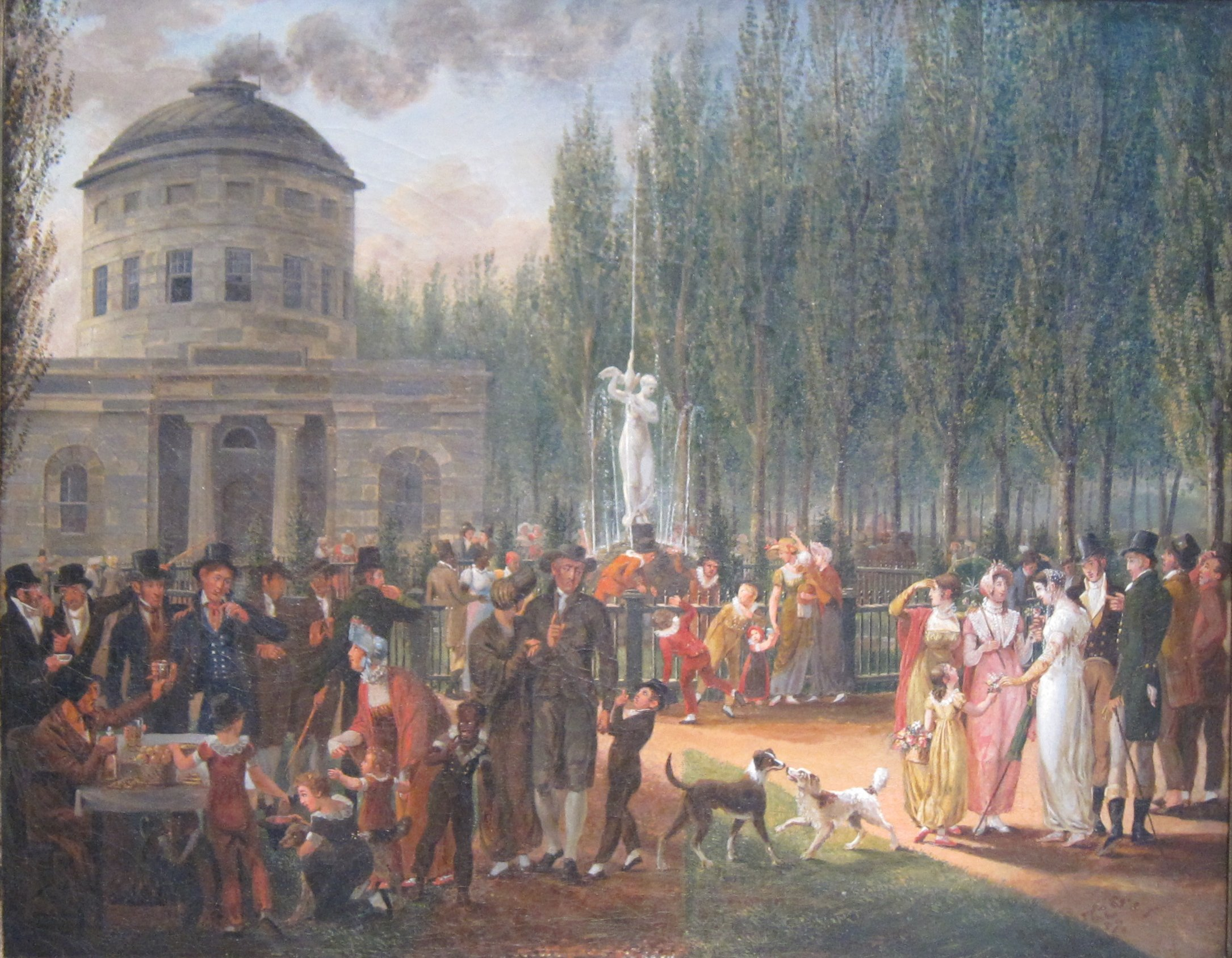
Fourth of July Celebration in Centre Square by John Lewis Krimmel in 1812, now at the Pennsylvania Academy of the Fine Arts; Rush's Water Nymph and Bittern (1809) is the fountain statue at center.

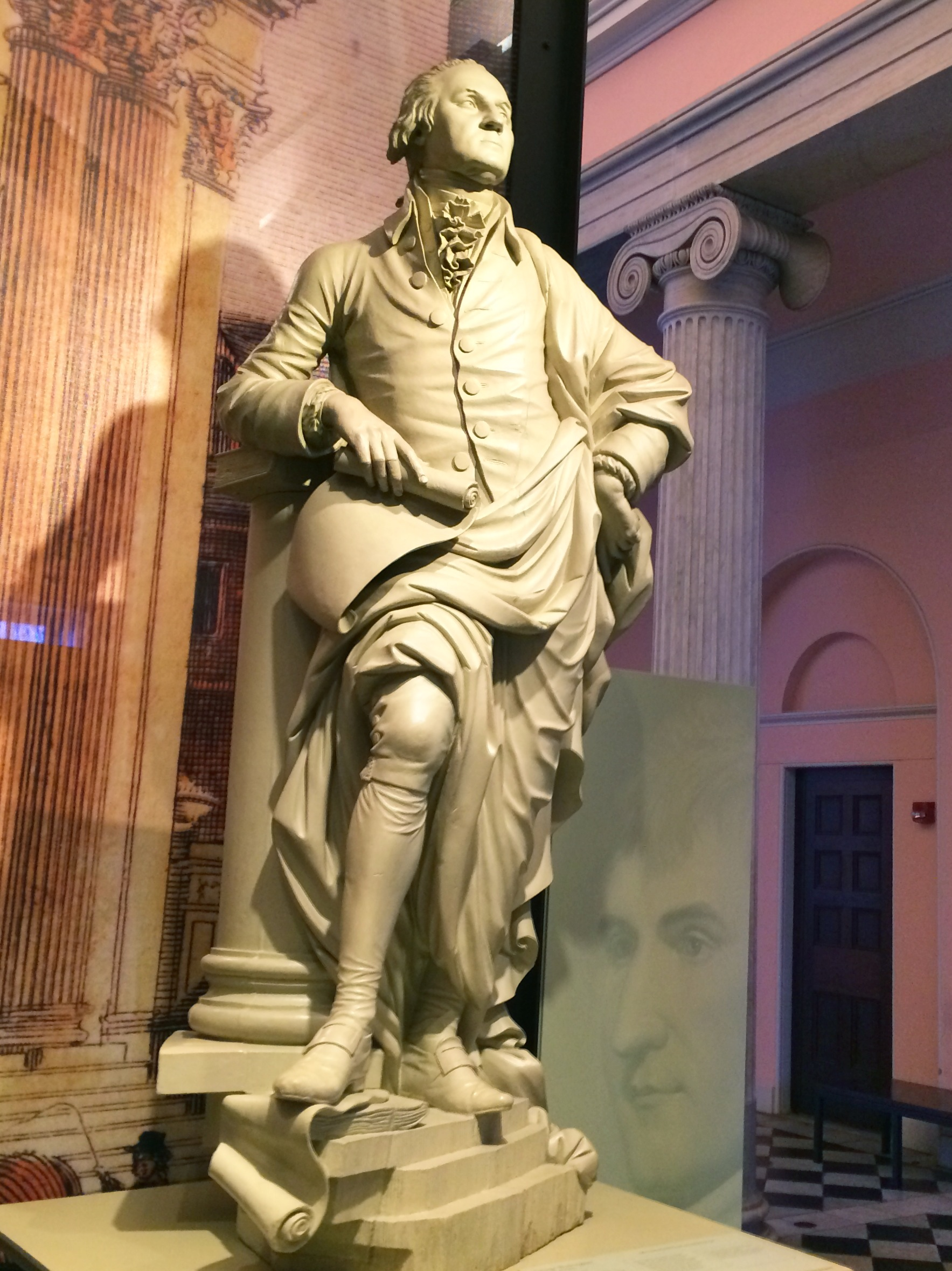
Rush's 1815 sculpture, George Washington, on display at Independence Hall in the 1870s and now at the Second Bank of the United States.

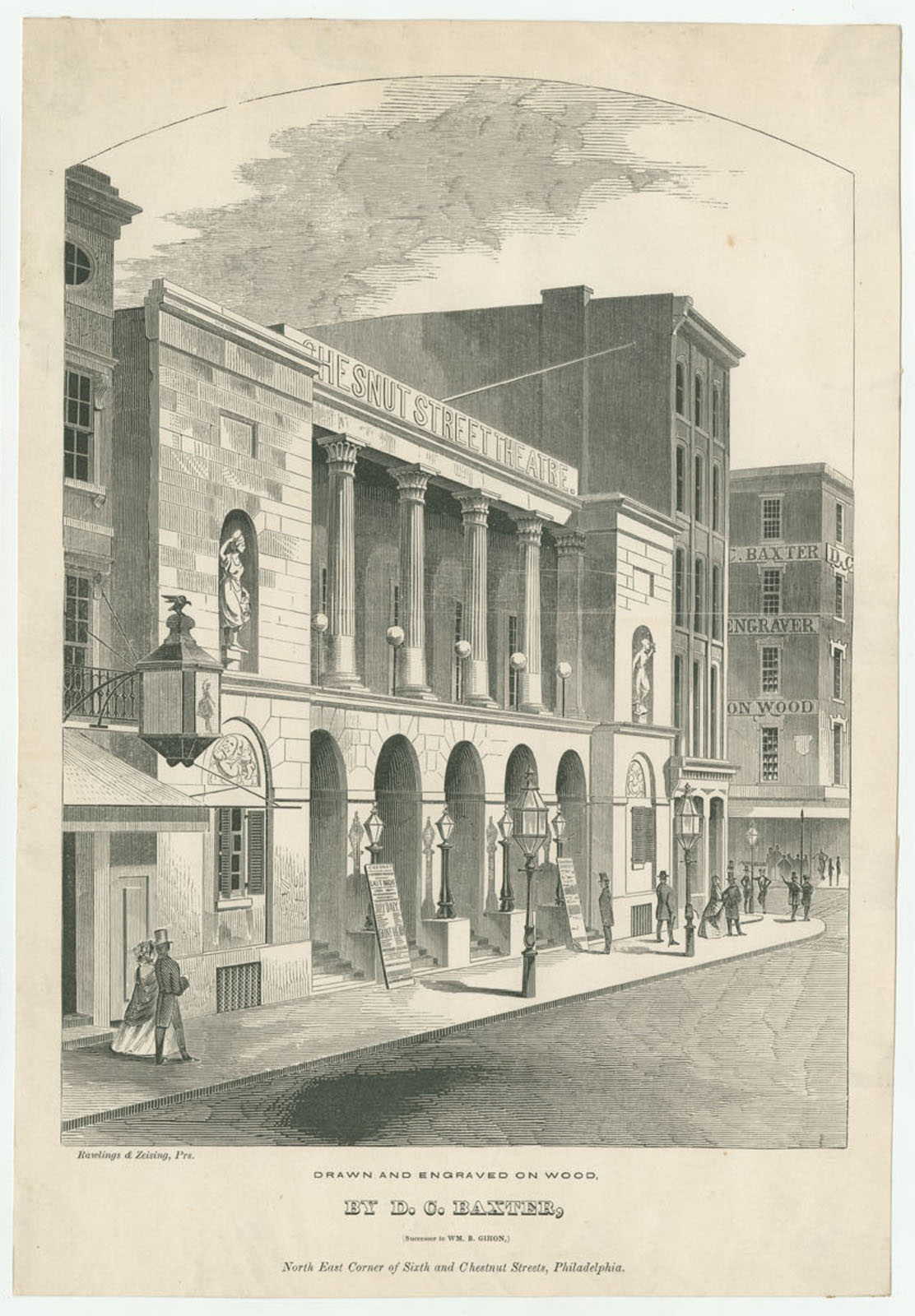
The Second Chestnut Street Theatre in 1855; in 1820, Rush carved two statues flanking the entrance, representing both tragedy and comedy

Rush carved figureheads for four of the original six frigates of the United States Navy: USS United States (Genius of the United States, 1796, whereabouts unknown), USS Constellation (Nature, 1797, whereabouts unknown), USS Chesapeake (Revolution, 1799, whereabouts unknown), and USS Congress (Goddess of Wisdom, 1799, whereabouts unknown). He designed the figurehead for a fifth original frigate, USS Constitution (Hercules, 1796, carved by John Skillin, whereabouts unknown, replaced by a figurehead of Andrew Jackson 1848), and may have designed that for the sixth, USS President (George Washington, 1800, carved by Rush's former apprentice Daniel N. Train, whereabouts unknown).

He also carved figureheads for the U.S. Navy frigates USS John Adams (John Adams, 1799, whereabouts unknown), USS Philadelphia (Hercules, 1799, burned 1804), and USS Potomac (Captain John Smith, 1822, whereabouts unknown). And he carved figureheads for the gun-ships USS Franklin (Benjamin Franklin, 1815, U.S. Naval Academy Museum), USS Columbus (Christopher Columbus, 1819, whereabouts unknown), USS North Carolina (Sir Walter Raleigh, 1820, whereabouts unknown), and USS Pennsylvania (Hercules, 1824–37, attributed to Rush or his son John, whereabouts unknown).

Rush was one of the first to create outdoor public sculpture in the United States. His twin figures, Comedy and Tragedy (1808, Philadelphia Museum of Art), were originally installed in niches on the façade of Philadelphia's Chestnut Street Theater. His Water Nymph and Bittern (1809), was created as a fountain statue for the Center Square Waterworks, designed by Benjamin Latrobe, that stood at what is now the site of Philadelphia City Hall. The Schuylkill Permanent Bridge (Market Street Bridge) in Philadelphia was adorned with his sculptures of Agriculture and Commerce (1812, whereabouts unknown). Architect William Strickland's Philadelphia Custom House featured a figure named Commerce (1819, whereabouts unknown).

Rush's sculptures of Wisdom and Justice (by 1825, Fairmount Park Commission) decorated a triumphal arch erected in front of Independence Hall for the 1824 visit of the Marquis de Lafayette. During the Frenchman's 8-day stay in Philadelphia, Rush carved a portrait bust of Lafayette (1824, Pennsylvania Academy of the Fine Arts).

His masterpiece may have been a life-sized statue of the Crucifixion, carved for St. Augustine's Church in 1810. It was destroyed in 1844, when the church was burned during Philadelphia's anti-Catholic riots.

Rush carved allegorical figures of The Schuylkill Chained (1825) and The Waterworks (1825) for the Fairmount Waterworks. These were installed atop pavilions along the Schuylkill River. Water Nymph and Bittern was moved to the Fairmount Waterworks at about the same time. A bronze casting of the wooden Water Nymph and Bittern statue was made in 1872.

=== Death ===
On January 7, 1833, Rush died in Philadelphia. He is interred at The Woodlands in Philadelphia.

== Legacy ==
Rush has been called the Father of American sculpture. His early woodworking experience translated into sculptures that were deeply undercut and visible from far away through the dramatic use of contrast and strong shadows. Rush blended American artisanal tradition and neoclassical form.

Along with his friend Charles Willson Peale, Rush helped found the Pennsylvania Academy of Fine Arts, showing his interest in art beyond the American craft tradition. At age 66, he carved a self-portrait bust (1822), that is now at PAFA. Wisdom and Justice are on loan to PAFA, whose holdings include a collection of Rush's portrait busts, a life-sized eagle statue attributed to him, and the head of the nymph from Water Nymph and Bittern.

Rush's life-sized statue of George Washington (1815), long exhibited at Independence Hall, is now at the Second Bank of the United States. Seven life-sized allegorical figures by him (1820–22) are exhibited at the Philadelphia Masonic Temple. Collections of his portrait busts can be found at the Library Company of Philadelphia and the American Philosophical Society. A ship figurehead of Peace is at the Independence Seaport Museum. A ship figurehead of Benjamin Franklin is at Yale University Art Gallery. An 1817 portrait bust of George Washington is in the collection of the Museum of the American Revolution. The statues "Exhortation" and "Praise" (1812), originally located at St. Paul's Church, were given to St. Peter's Episcopal Church in Philadelphia in 1831, along with a cluster of cherubim, also by Rush.

The largest collection of Rush's work can be found at the Philadelphia Museum of Art, including Comedy, Tragedy, The Schuylkill Chained, The Waterworks, portrait busts, and the 1872 bronze casting of Water Nymph and Bittern (on loan from the Fairmount Park Commission). The museum's holdings include many of Thomas Eakins's sketches and studies related to his paintings of Rush, along with the most famous painting: William Rush Carving his Allegorical Figure of the Schuylkill River (aka William Rush and His Model), 1876–77.

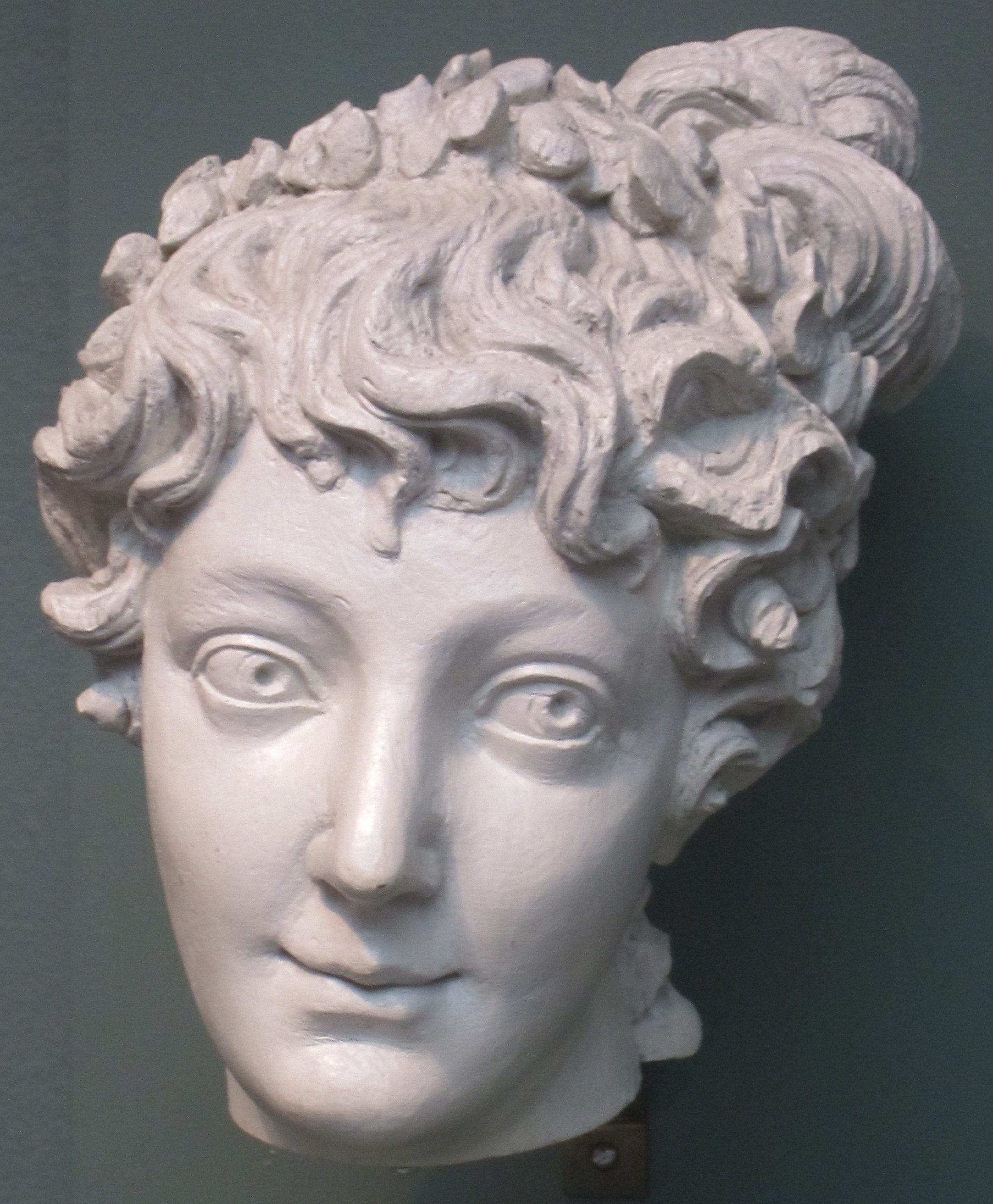
Head of the Water Nymph (1809), Pine, painted white. Pennsylvania Academy of the Fine Arts. Philadelphia

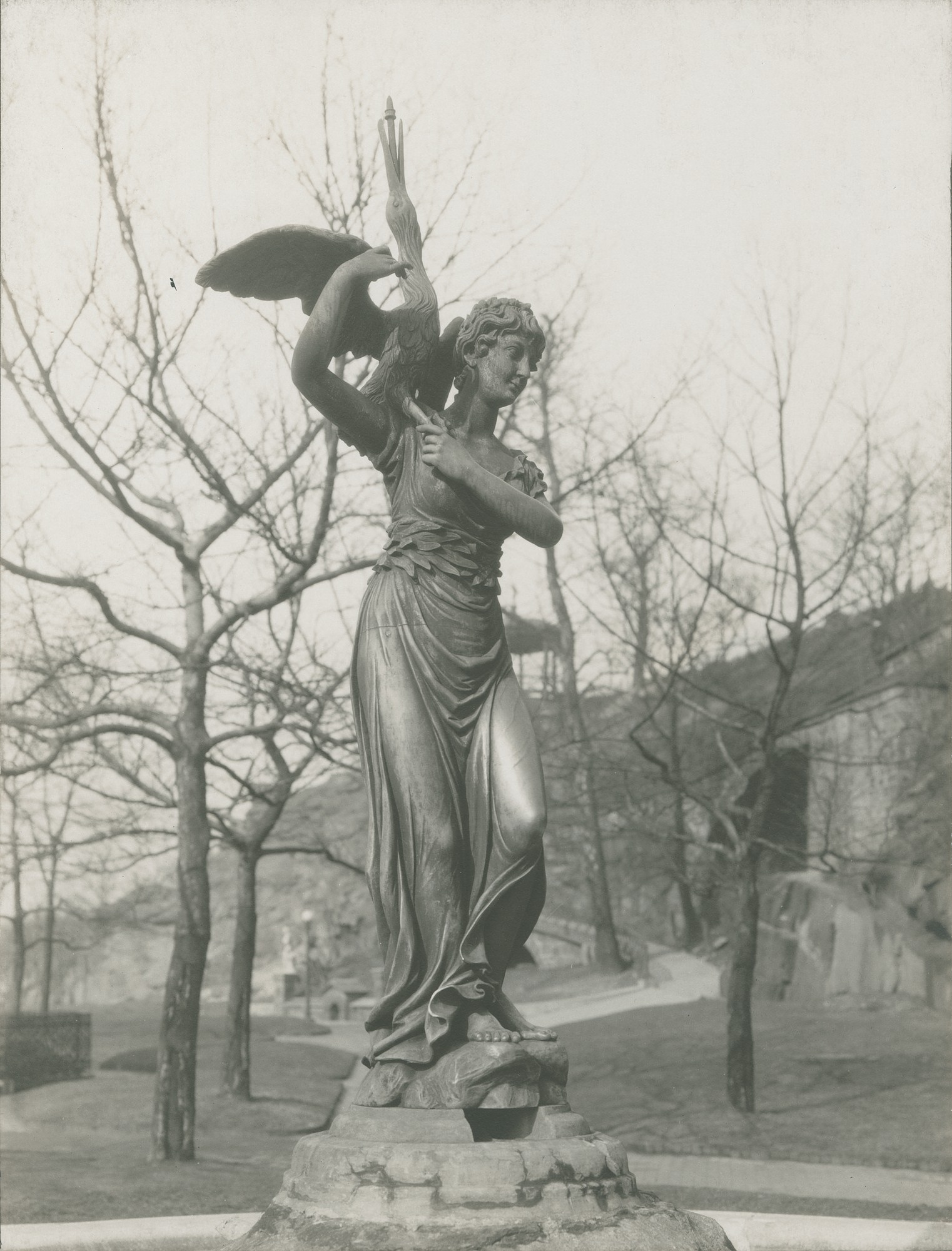
1872 bronze casting of Rush's Water Nymph and Bittern (1809)

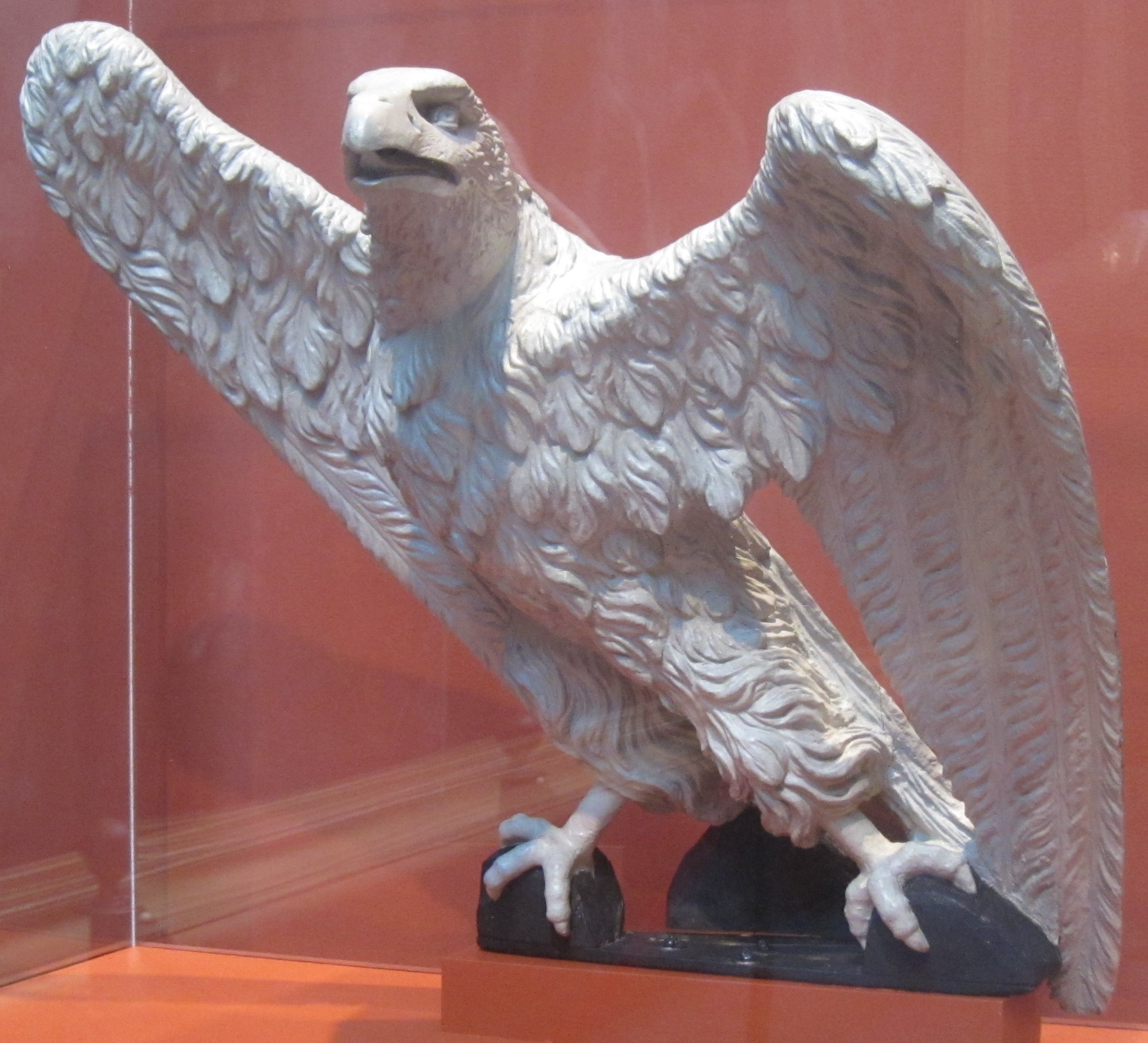
Eagle (c. 1810), attributed to Rush, at the Pennsylvania Academy of the Fine Arts in Philadelphia

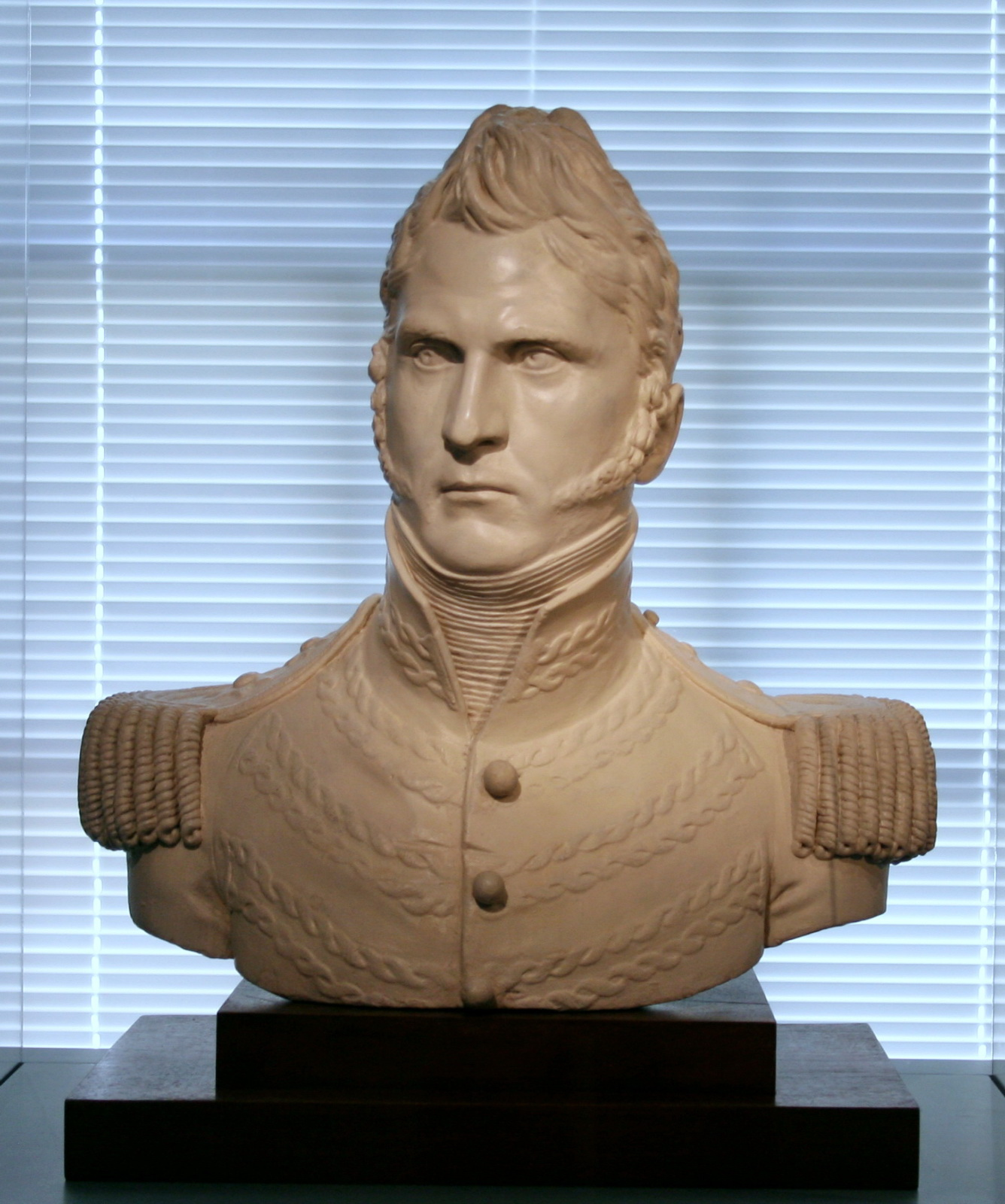
Bust of General Winfield Scott (c. 1814–17), plaster, at the National Portrait Gallery in Washington, D.C.

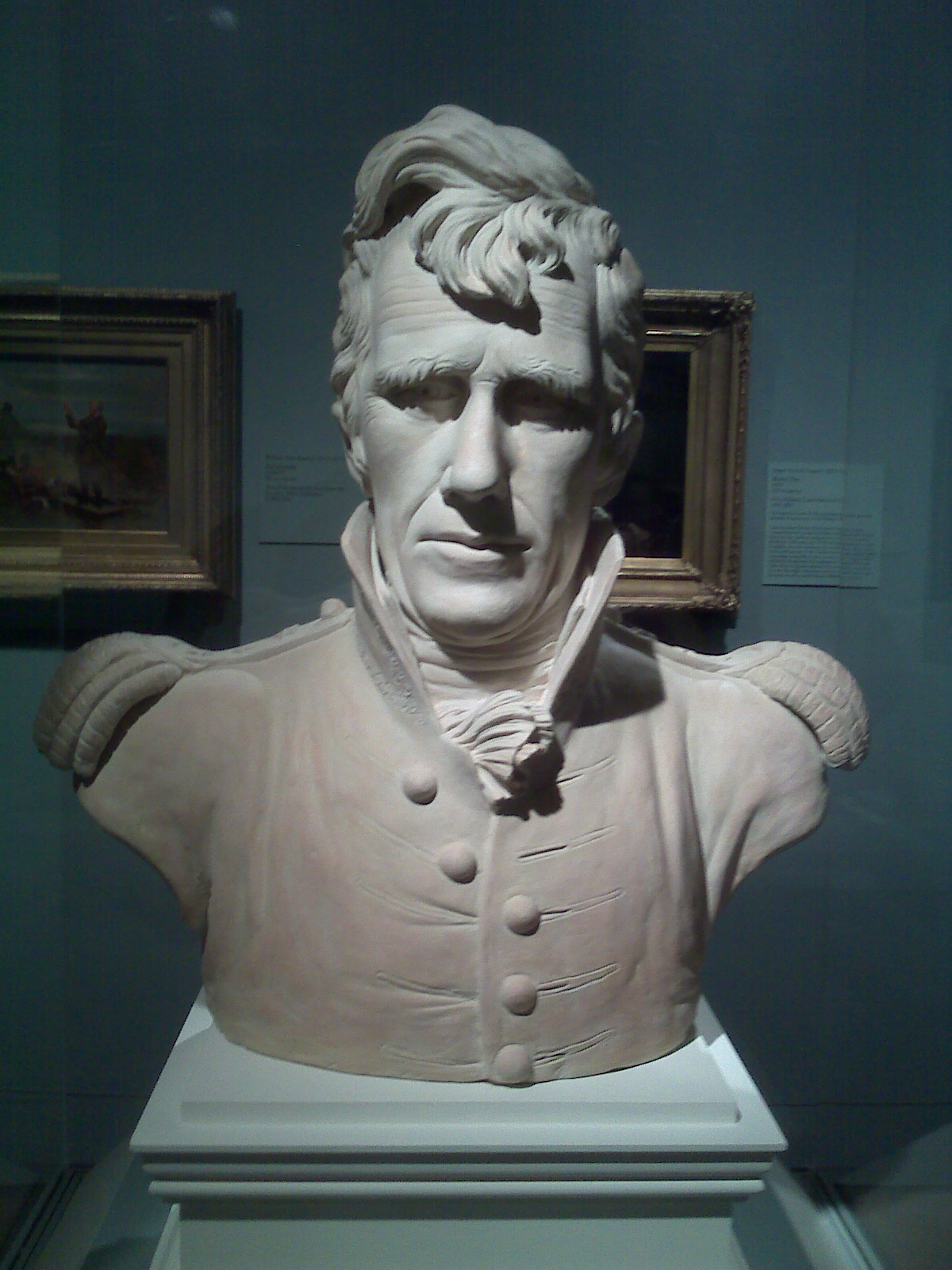
Bust of General Andrew Jackson (1819), terracotta, at the Art Institute of Chicago in Chicago

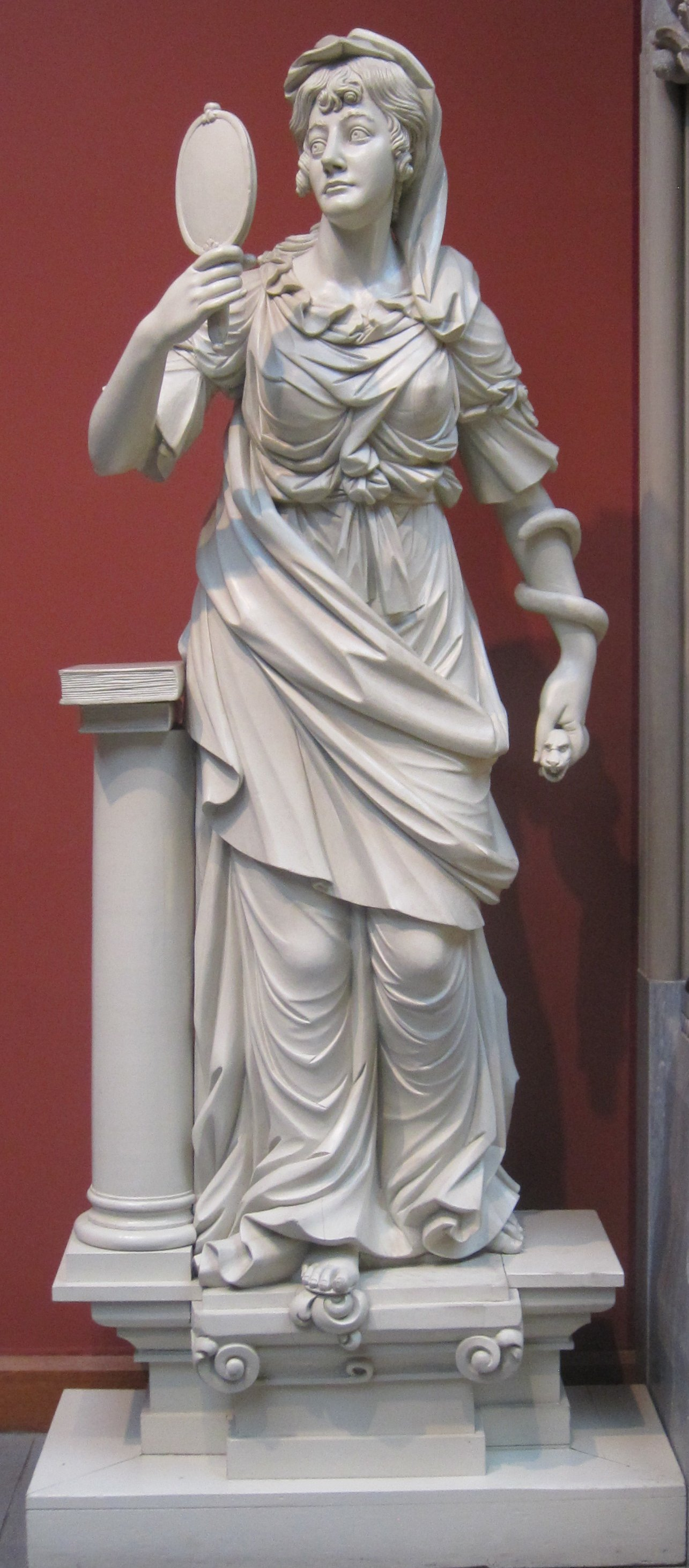
Wisdom (by 1824), on loan to Pennsylvania Academy of the Fine Arts in Philadelphia

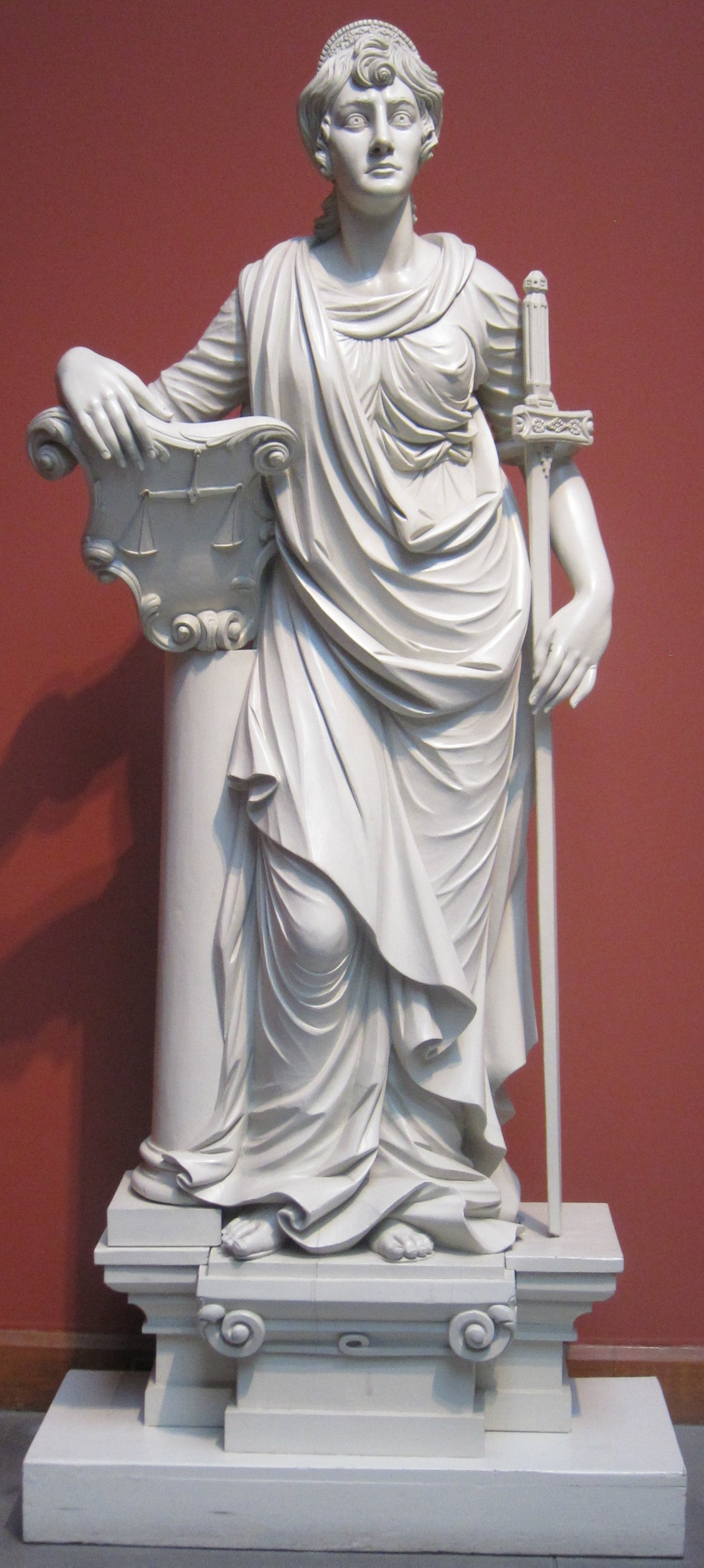
Justice (by 1824), on loan to Pennsylvania Academy of the Fine Arts in Philadelphia

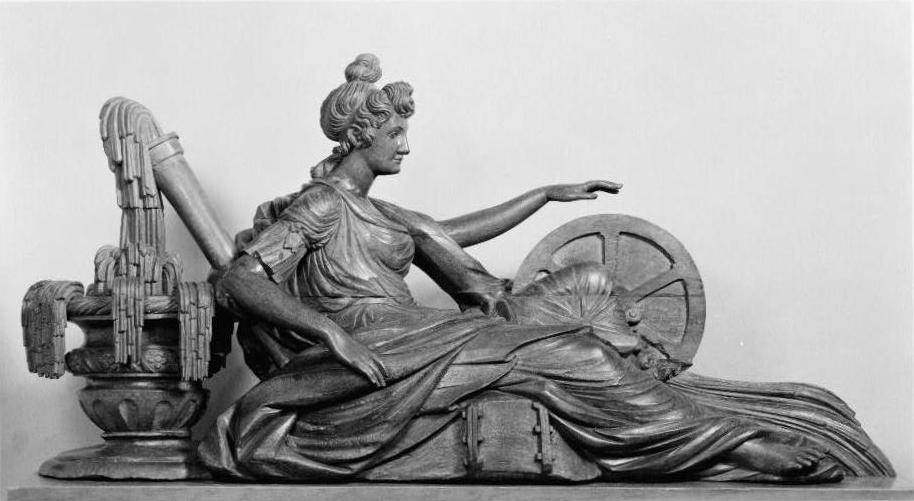
Allegorical Figure of The Waterworks (1825). pine, painted white. Philadelphia Museum of Art in Philadelphia

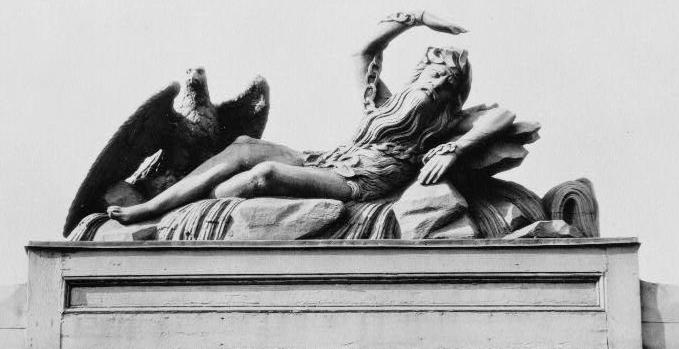
Allegorical Figure of The Schuylkill Chained (1825). Pine, painted white. Philadelphia Museum of Art in Philadelphia

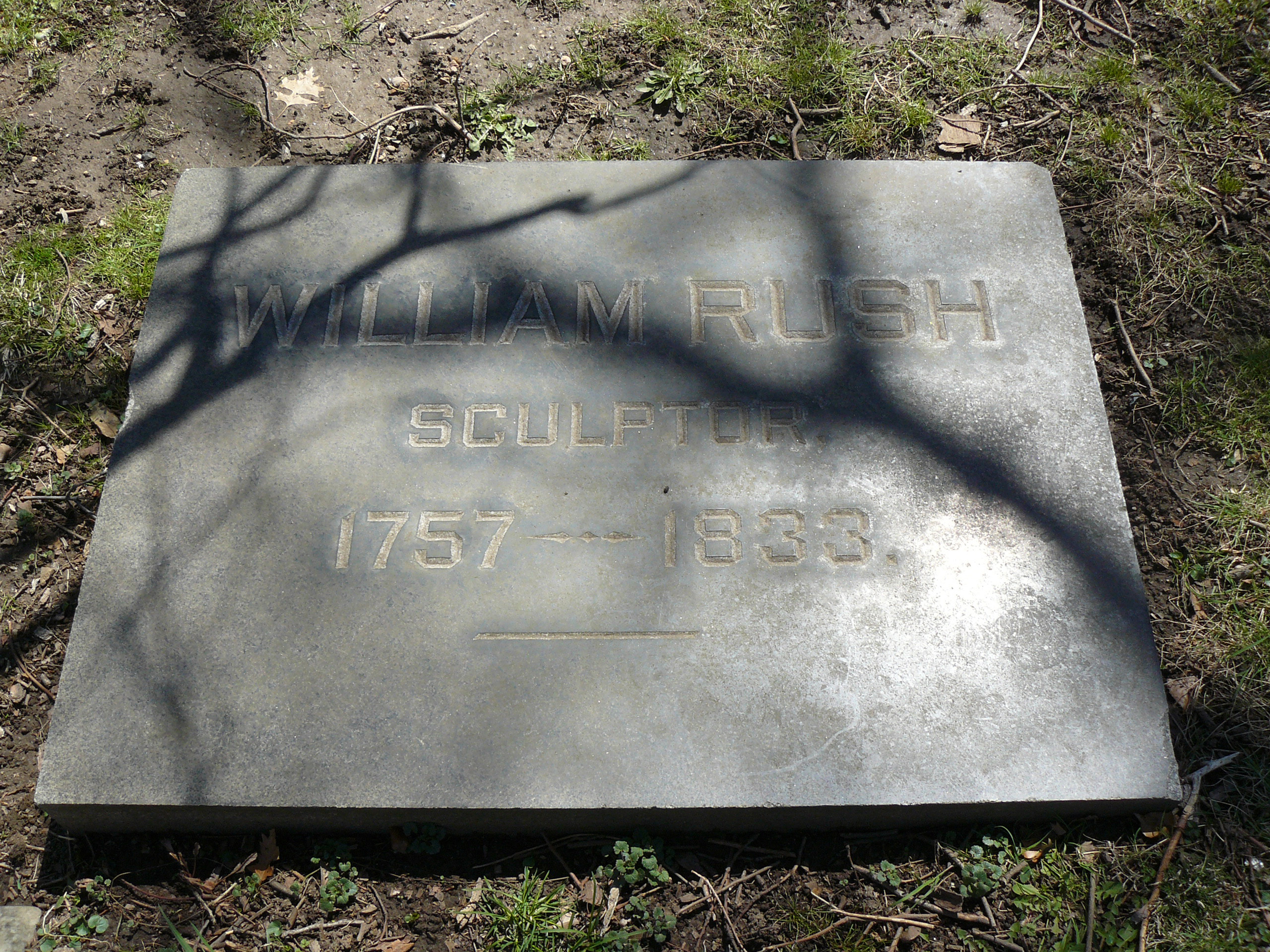
Rush's grave in Woodlands Cemetery in West Philadelphia

== Eakins and Rush ==
Painter Thomas Eakins (1844–1916) felt a strong affinity toward Rush. As the 1876 Centennial Exposition approached, he painted two versions of a scene showing Rush carving his Allegorical Figure of the Schuylkill River (Water Nymph and Bittern). Eakins's portrayal of Rush using a nude model may not have been historically accurate, but it was important to the painter, who made many preparatory sketches and even sculpted miniature wax figures of the people and statues in the paintings.

Late in life, Eakins returned to the subject, beginning (but not completing) two versions of Rush with a nude model. In one of his final paintings, created almost exactly a century after Rush's carving of Water Nymph and Bittern, Eakins seems to have portrayed himself as Rush.

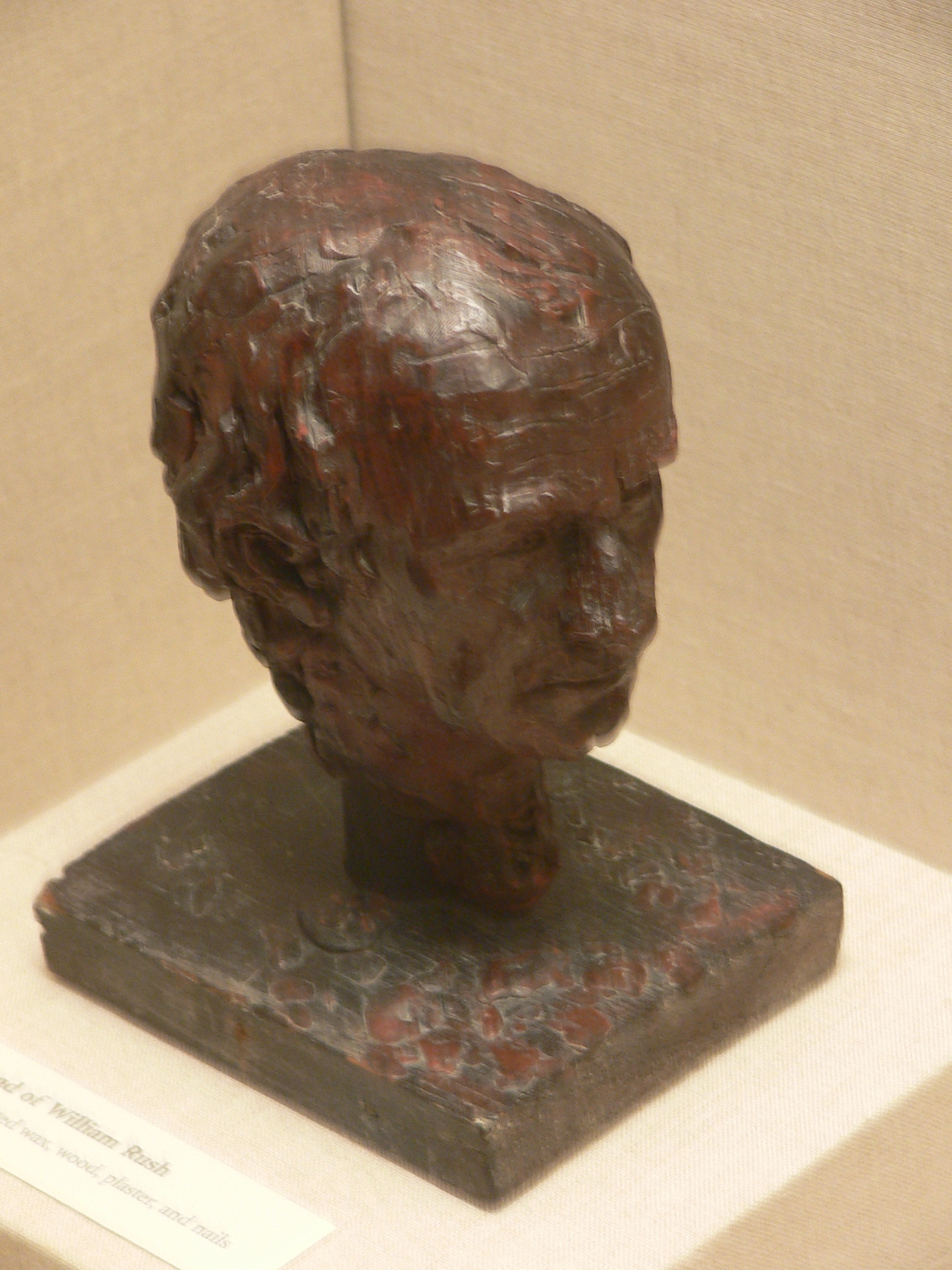
Wax study of Rush's head by Thomas Eakins (1876), Philadelphia Museum of Art in Philadelphia

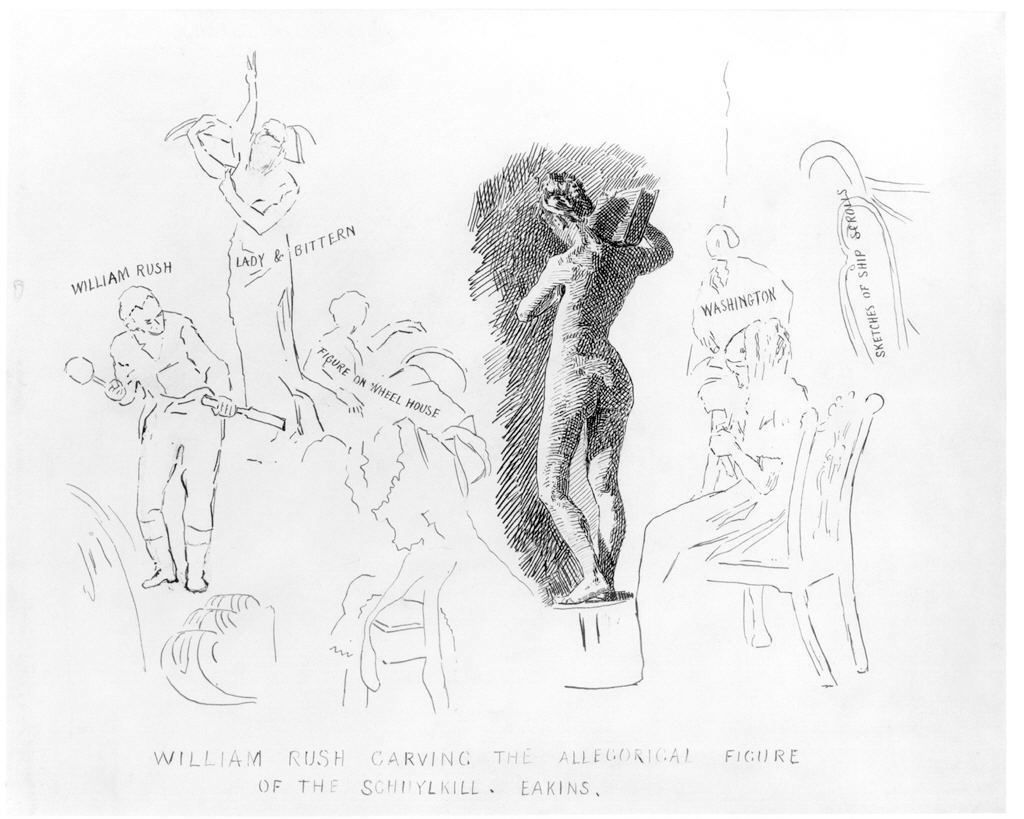
Eakins's key to the 1876-77 painting, Hirshhorn Museum and Sculpture Garden in Washington, D.C.

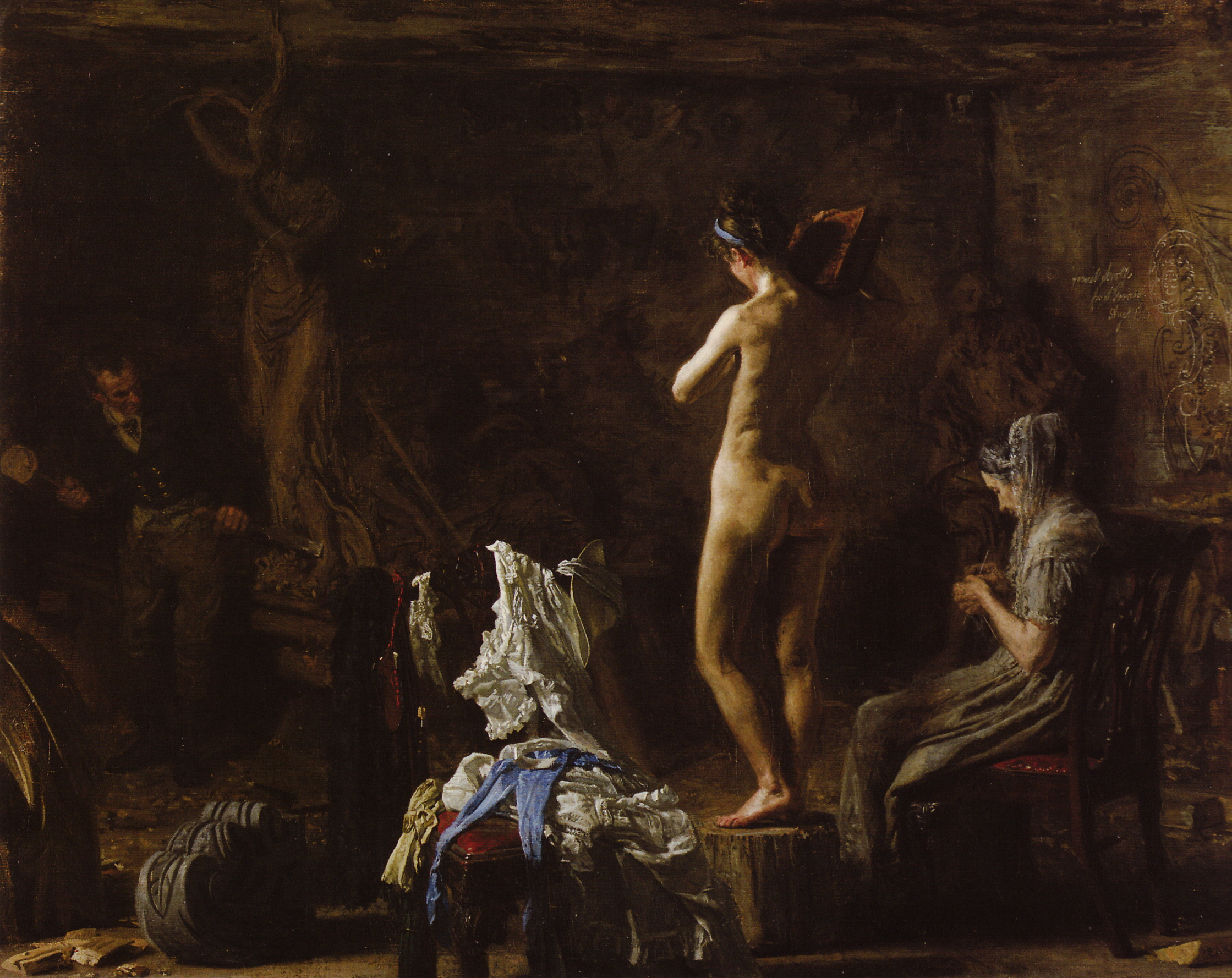
William Rush Carving his Allegorical Figure of the Schuylkill River by Thomas Eakins, 1876–77, oil on canvas (mounted on Masonite), 20 1/8 x 26 1/8 inches (51.1 x 66.4 cm), Philadelphia Museum of Art in Philadelphia

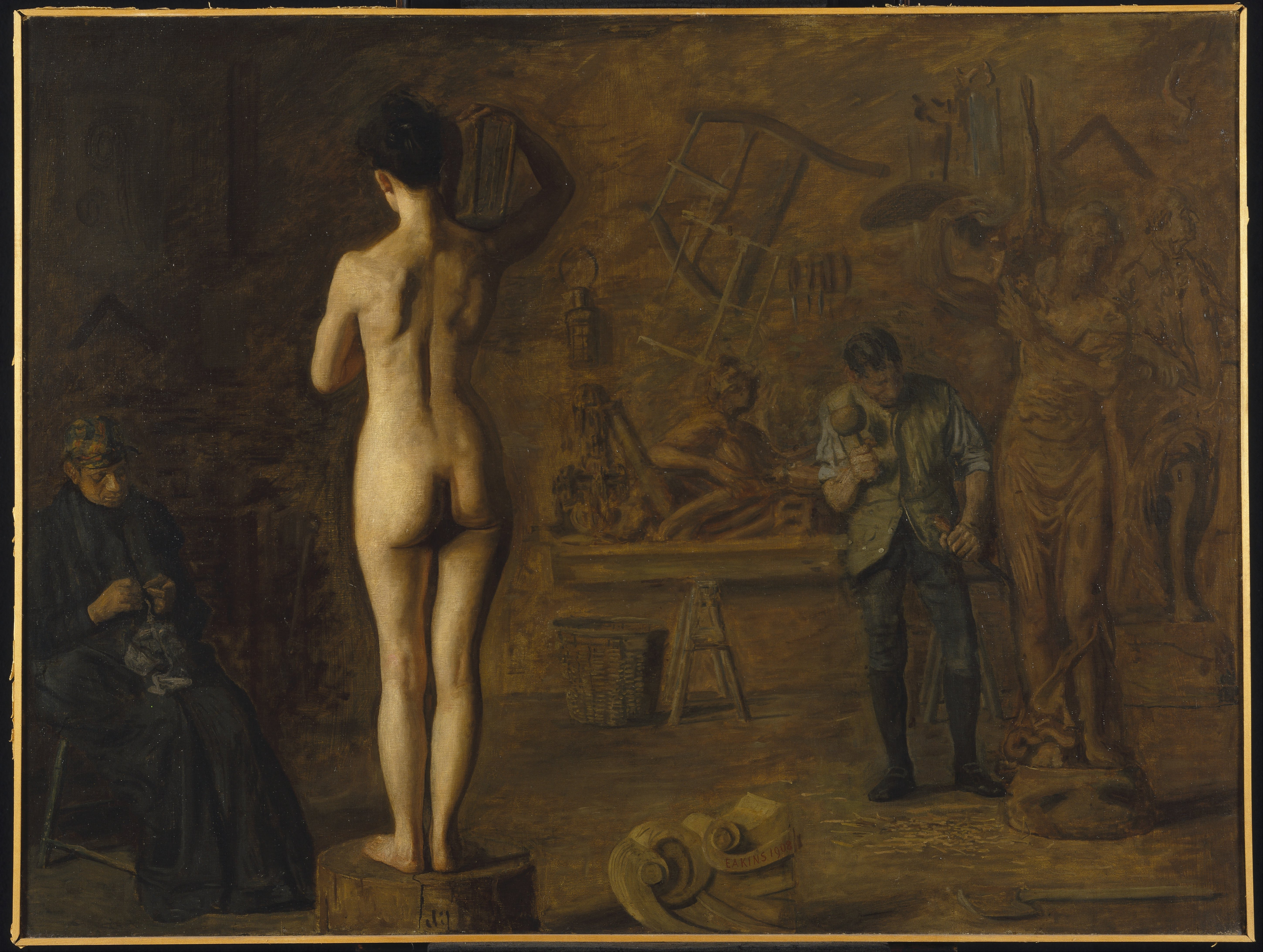
William Rush Carving his Allegorical Figure of the Schuylkill River by Thomas Eakins, 1908

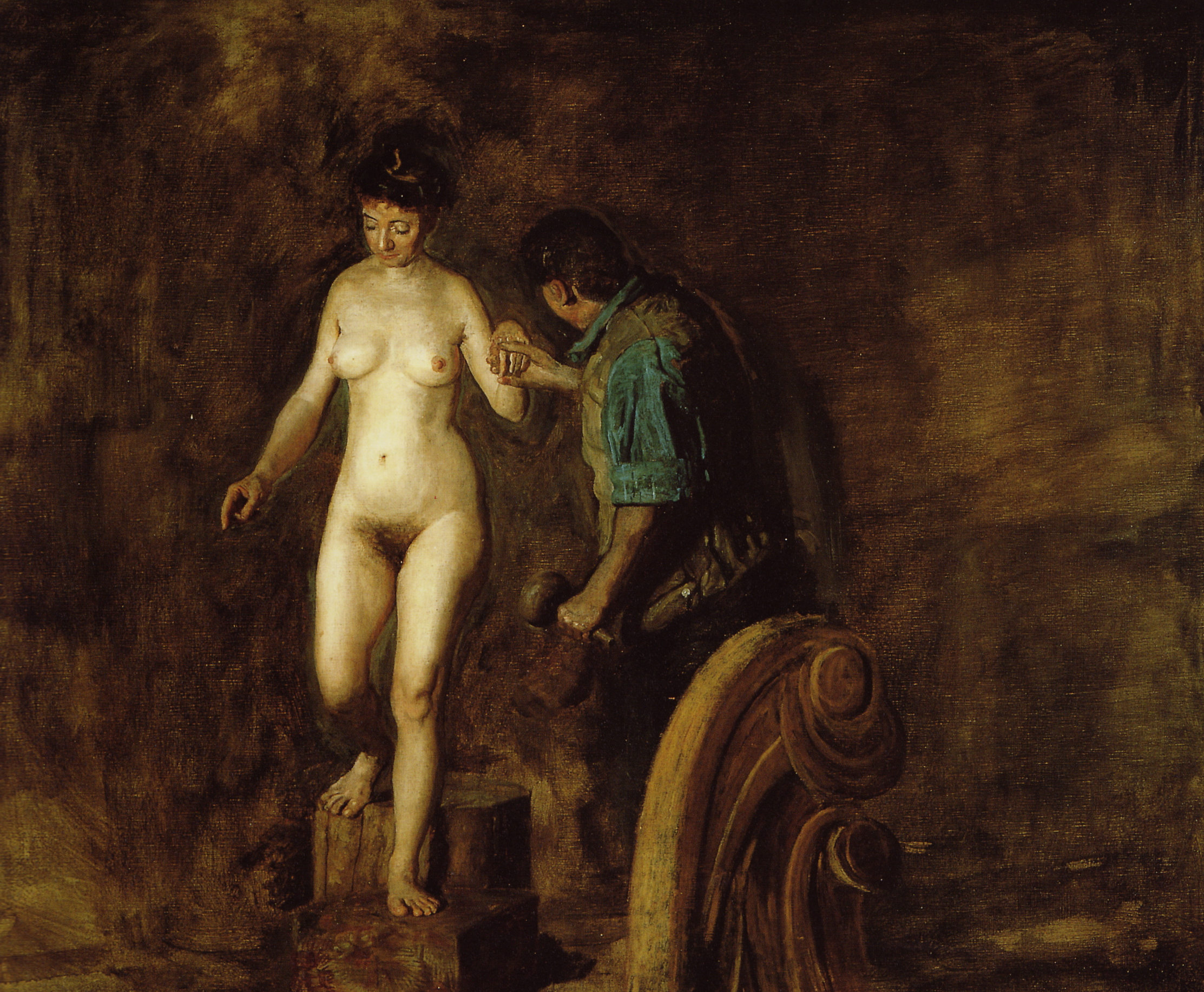
William Rush and His Model by Thomas Eakins (1907–08), Honolulu Museum of Art in Honolulu, Hawaii

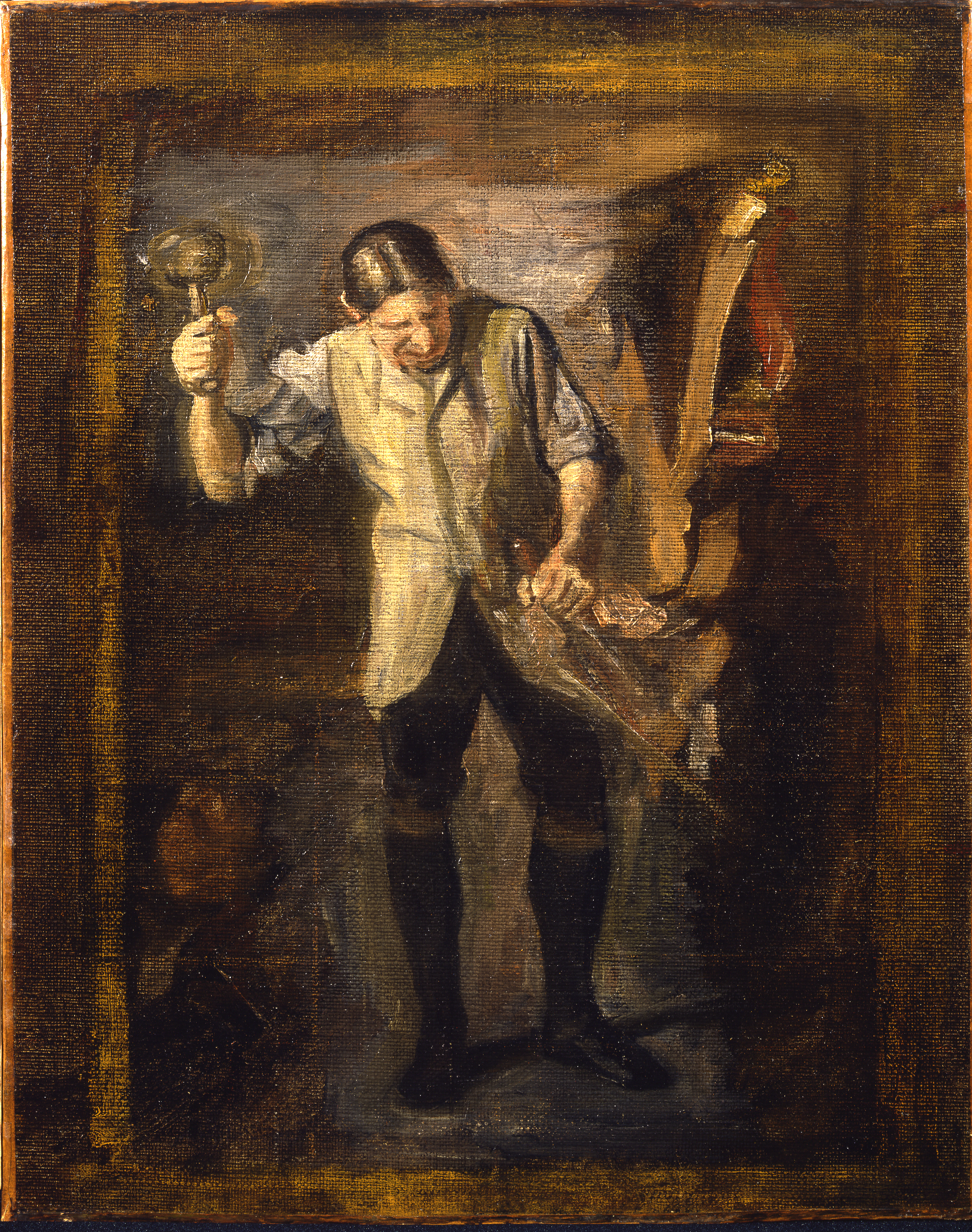
Study of William Rush by Thomas Eakins (1907–08), private collection
