= Second Bank of the United States =

American national bank (1816–1841)

Coordinates: 39°56′55″N 75°08′54″W

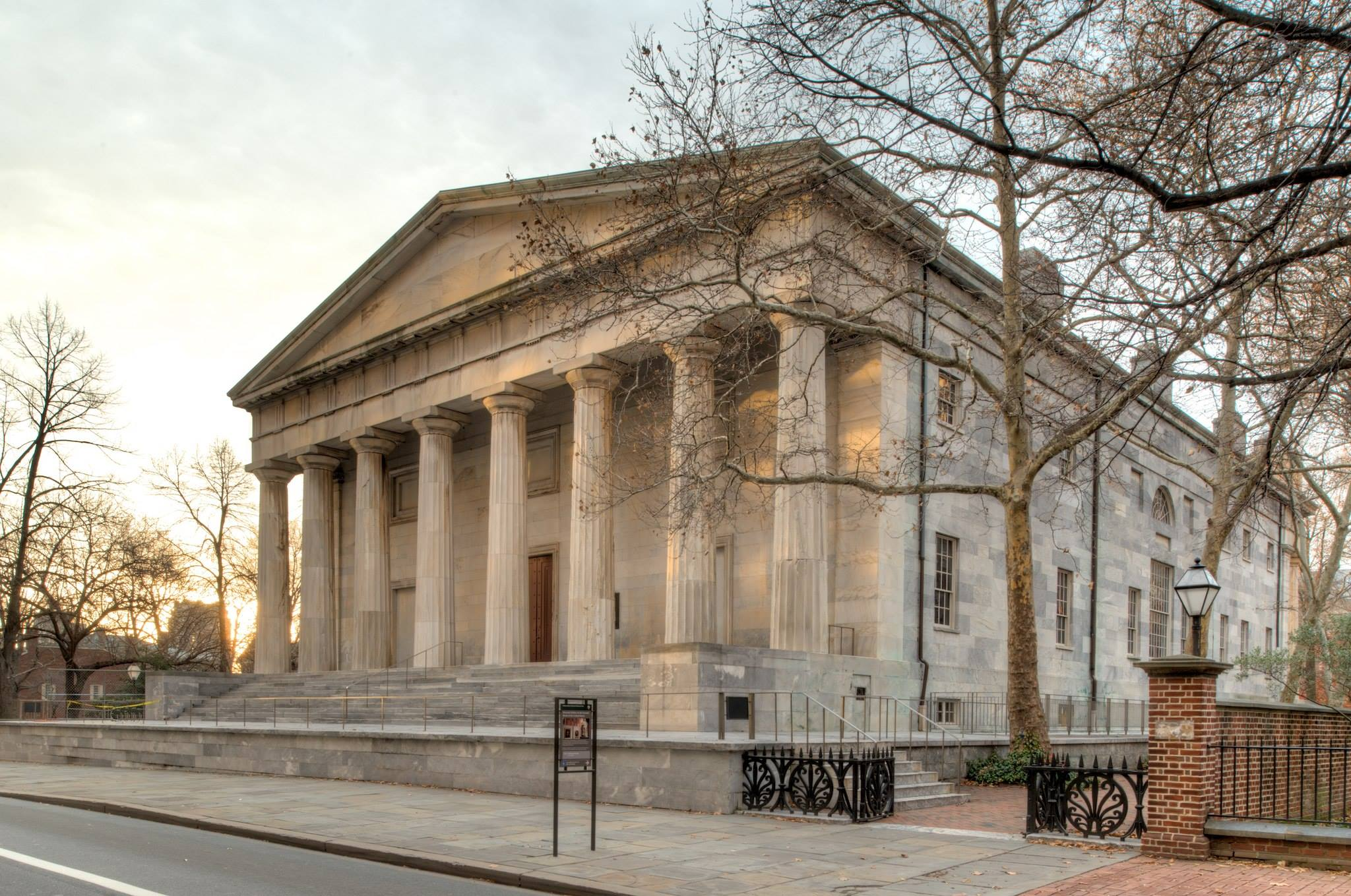
- The north façade of the bank on Chestnut Street
- Type: Public–private partnership
- Industry: Banking
- Founded: 1816
- Defunct: 1836 (federal charter); 1841 (operations); 1852 (state charter)
- Fate: Liquidated
- Headquarters: Philadelphia, Pennsylvania, U.S.
- Key people: William Jones (president 1816–19); Nicholas Biddle (president 1823–36)

The Second Bank of the United States was the second federally authorized national bank in the United States, chartered under the Madison administration. Located in Philadelphia, Pennsylvania, the bank was authorized from February 1816 to January 1836. The bank's formal name, according to section 9 of its charter as passed by Congress, was "The President, Directors, and Company, of the Bank of the United States". While other banks in the United States were chartered by and only allowed to have branches in a single state, it was authorized to have branches in multiple states and lend money to the U.S. Government.

A private corporation with public duties, the bank handled all fiscal transactions for the U.S. government, and was accountable to Congress and the U.S. Treasury. Twenty percent of its capital was owned by the federal government, the bank's single largest shareholder. Four thousand private investors held 80 percent of the bank's capital, including three thousand Europeans. The bulk of the stocks were held by a few hundred wealthy Americans. In its time, the institution was the largest monied corporation in the world.

The essential function of the bank was to regulate the public credit issued by private banking institutions through the fiscal duties it performed for the U.S. Treasury, and to establish a sound and stable national currency. The federal deposits endowed the bank with its regulatory capacity.

Modeled on Alexander Hamilton's First Bank of the United States, the Second Bank was chartered in 1816 by President James Madison – who in 1791 had attacked the First Bank as unconstitutional – and began operations at its main branch in Philadelphia on January 7, 1817, managing 25 branch offices nationwide by 1832.

The efforts to renew the bank's charter put the institution at the center of the general election of 1832, in which the bank's president Nicholas Biddle and pro-bank National Republicans led by Henry Clay clashed with the "hard-money" Andrew Jackson administration and eastern banking interests in the Bank War. Failing to secure recharter, the Second Bank became a private corporation in 1836, and underwent liquidation in 1841. There would not be national banks again until the passage of the National Bank Act in 1863–1864.

== History ==
=== Establishment ===
The political support for the revival of a national banking system was rooted in the early 19th century transformation of the country from simple Jeffersonian agrarianism towards one interdependent with industrialization and finance. In the aftermath of the War of 1812, the federal government suffered from the disarray of an unregulated currency and a lack of fiscal order; business interests sought security for their government bonds. A national alliance arose to legislate a national bank to address these needs.

The political climate—dubbed the Era of Good Feelings—favored the development of national programs and institutions, including a protective tariff, internal improvements and the revival of a Bank of the United States. Southern and western support for a bank, led by Republican nationalists John C. Calhoun of South Carolina and Henry Clay of Kentucky, was decisive in the successful chartering effort. The charter was signed into law by James Madison on April 10, 1816. Subsequent efforts by Calhoun and Clay to earmark the bank's $1.5 million establishment "bonus", and annual dividends estimated at $650,000, as a fund for internal improvements, were vetoed by President Madison, on strict constructionist grounds.

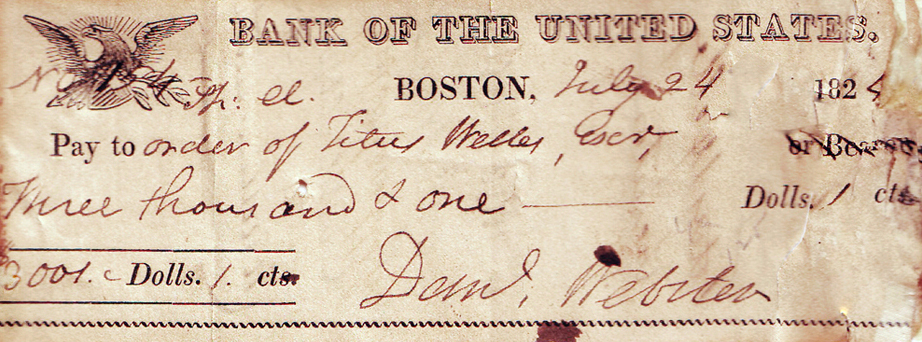
An 1824 draft on the bank written and signed by Daniel Webster, its attorney and the director of the Boston branch

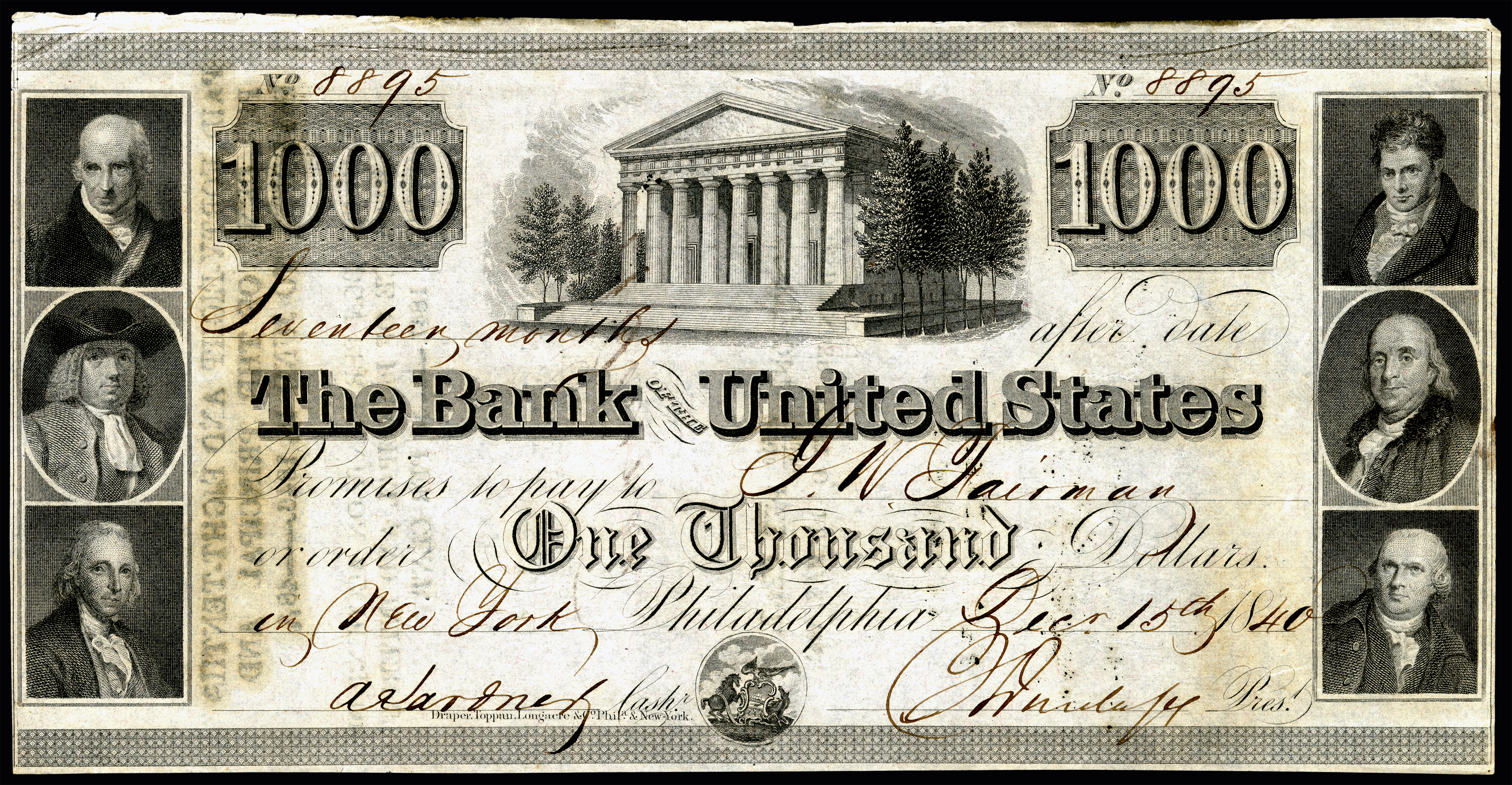
A promissory note issued by the Second Bank of the United States, December 15, 1840, for the amount of $1,000

Opposition to a new bank emanated from two interests. Old Republicans, represented by John Taylor of Caroline and John Randolph of Roanoke, characterized the Second Bank as both constitutionally illegitimate and a direct threat to Jeffersonian agrarianism, state sovereignty and the institution of slavery, expressed by Taylor's statement that "...if Congress could incorporate a bank, it might emancipate a slave." Hostile to the regulatory effects of the national bank, private banks—proliferating with or without state charters—had scuttled rechartering of the First Bank in 1811. These interests played significant roles in undermining the institution during the administration of U.S. President Andrew Jackson (1829–1837).

=== Economic functions ===
The Second Bank was a national bank. However, it did not serve the functions of a modern central bank: It did not set monetary policy, regulate private banks, hold their excess reserves, or act as a lender of last resort.

The bank was launched in the midst of a major global market readjustment as Europe recovered from the Napoleonic Wars. It was charged with restraining uninhibited private bank note issue—already in progress—that threatened to create a credit bubble and the risks of a financial collapse. Government land sales in the West, fueled by European demand for agricultural products, ensured that a speculative bubble would form. Simultaneously, the national bank was engaged in promoting a democratized expansion of credit to accommodate laissez-faire impulses among eastern business entrepreneurs and credit-hungry western and southern farmers.

Under the management of its first president William Jones, the bank failed to control paper money issued from its branch banks in the West and South, contributing to the post-war speculative land boom. When the U.S. markets collapsed in the Panic of 1819—a result of global economic adjustments—the bank came under withering criticism for its belated tight money policies—policies that exacerbated mass unemployment and plunging property values. Further, it transpired that branch directors for the Baltimore office had engaged in fraud and larceny.

Resigning in January 1819, Jones was replaced by Langdon Cheves, who continued the contraction in credit in an effort to stop inflation and stabilize the bank, even as the economy began to correct. The bank's reaction to the crisis—a clumsy expansion, then a sharp contraction of credit—indicated its weakness, not its strength. The effects were catastrophic, resulting in a protracted recession with mass unemployment and a sharp drop in property values that persisted until 1822. The financial crisis raised doubts among the American public as to the efficacy of paper money, and in whose interests a national system of finance operated. Upon this widespread disaffection the anti-bank Jacksonian Democrats would mobilize opposition to the bank in the 1830s. The bank was in general disrepute among most Americans when Nicholas Biddle, the third and last president of the bank, was appointed by President James Monroe in 1823.

Under Biddle's guidance, the bank evolved into a powerful institution that produced a strong and sound system of national credit and currency. From 1823 to 1833, Biddle expanded credit steadily, but with restraint, in a manner that served the needs of the expanding American economy. Albert Gallatin, former Secretary of the Treasury under Thomas Jefferson and James Madison, wrote in 1831 that the bank was fulfilling its charter expectations.

=== Jackson's Bank War ===
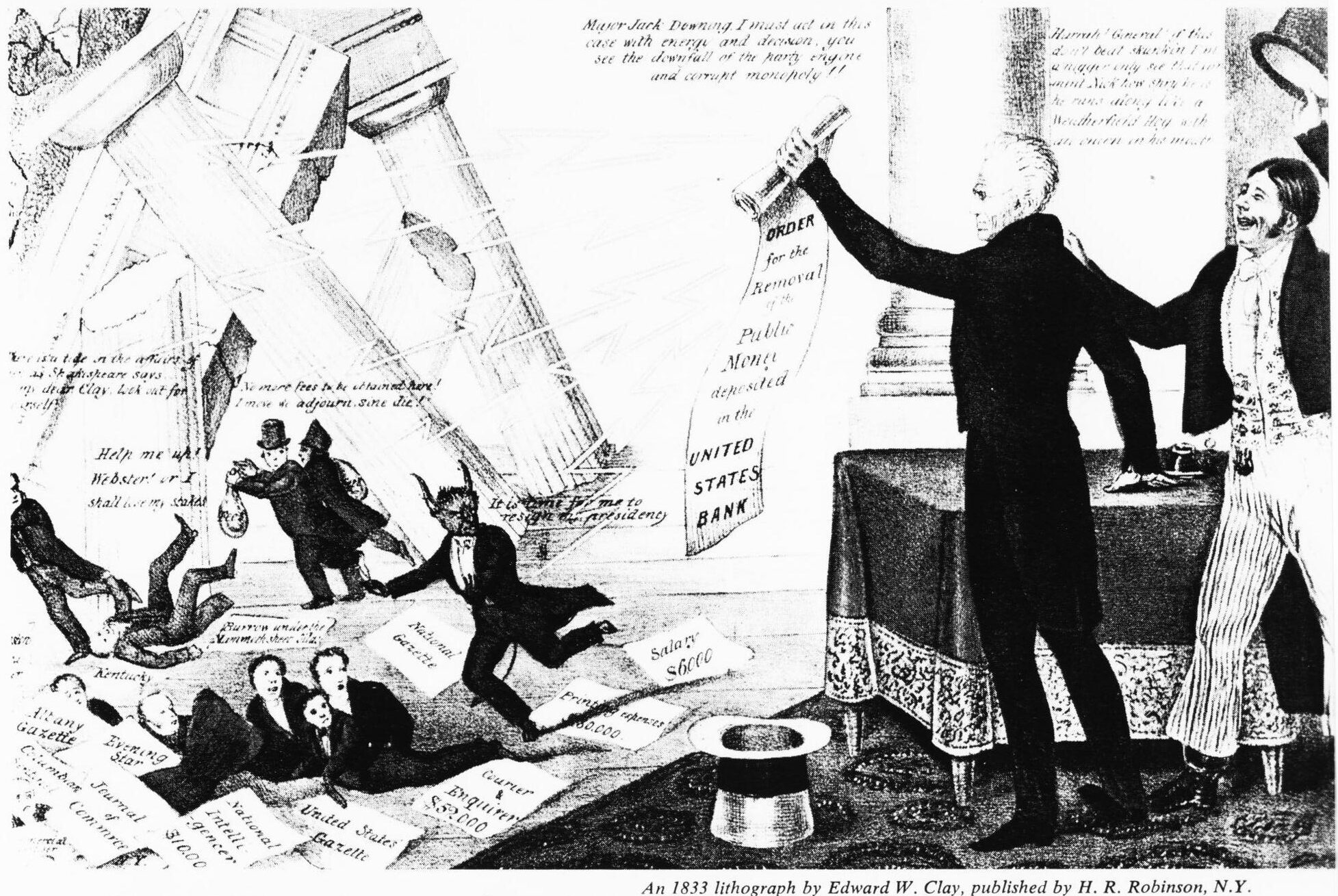
A Democratic cartoon from 1833 showing Jackson destroying the Second Bank with his "Order for the Removal", to the approval of the Uncle Sam-like figure to the right, and the annoyance of the bank's president, shown as the Devil himself. Numerous politicians and editors who were given favorable loans from the bank run for cover as the financial temple crashes down.

By the time of Jackson's inauguration in 1829, the bank appeared to be on solid footing. The Supreme Court had affirmed its constitutionality in McCulloch v. Maryland, the 1819 case which Daniel Webster had argued successfully on its behalf a decade earlier, the Treasury recognized the useful services it provided, and the American currency was healthy and stable. Public perceptions of the national bank were generally positive. The bank first came under attack by the Jackson administration in December 1829, on the grounds that it had failed to produce a stable national currency, and that it lacked constitutional legitimacy. Both houses of Congress responded with committee investigations and reports affirming the historical precedents for the bank's constitutionality and its pivotal role in furnishing a uniform currency. Jackson rejected these findings, and privately characterized the bank as a corrupt institution, dangerous to American liberties.

Biddle made repeated overtures to Jackson and his cabinet to secure a compromise on the bank's rechartering (its term due to expire in 1836) without success. Jackson and the anti-bank forces persisted in their condemnation of the bank, provoking an early recharter campaign by pro-bank National Republicans under Henry Clay. Clay's political ultimatum to Jackson—with Biddle's financial and political support—sparked the Bank War and placed the fate of the bank at center of the 1832 presidential election.

Jackson mobilized his political base by vetoing the recharter bill and, the veto sustained, easily won reelection on his anti-bank platform. Jackson proceeded to destroy the bank as a financial and political force by removing its federal deposits, and in 1833, federal revenue was diverted into selected private banks by executive order, ending the regulatory role of the Second Bank. (Note: See Andrew Jackson's State of the Union Addresses 1829–1836 Gutenberg)

In hopes of extorting a rescue of the bank, Biddle induced a short-lived financial crisis that was initially blamed on Jackson's executive action. By 1834, a general backlash against Biddle's tactics developed, ending the panic, and all recharter efforts were abandoned.

=== State bank ===
In February 1836, the bank became a private corporation under Pennsylvania law. A shortage of hard currency ensued, causing the Panic of 1837 and lasting approximately seven years. The bank suspended payment from October 1839 to January 1841, and permanently in February 1841. It then started a lengthy liquidation process, complicated by lawsuits, that ended in 1852 when it assigned its remaining assets to trustees and surrendered the state charter.

=== Branches ===
The bank maintained the following branches. Listed is the year each branch opened.

- Augusta, Georgia (1817, closed 1817)
- Baltimore, Maryland (1817)
- Boston, Massachusetts (1817)
- Charleston, South Carolina (1817)
- Chillicothe, Ohio (1817)
- Cincinnati, Ohio (1817)
- Fayetteville, North Carolina (1817)
- Lexington, Kentucky (1817)
- Louisville, Kentucky (1817)
- Middletown, Connecticut (1817)
- New Orleans, Louisiana (1817)
- New York City, New York (1817)
- Norfolk, Virginia (1817)
- Portsmouth, New Hampshire (1817)
- Providence, Rhode Island (1817)
- Richmond, Virginia (1817)
- Savannah, Georgia (1817)
- Washington, D.C. (1817)
- Mobile, Alabama (1826)
- Nashville, Tennessee (1827)
- Portland, Maine (1828)
- Buffalo, New York (1829)
- St. Louis, Missouri (1829)
- Burlington, Vermont (1830)
- Utica, New York (1830)
- Natchez, Mississippi (1830)

=== Presidents ===
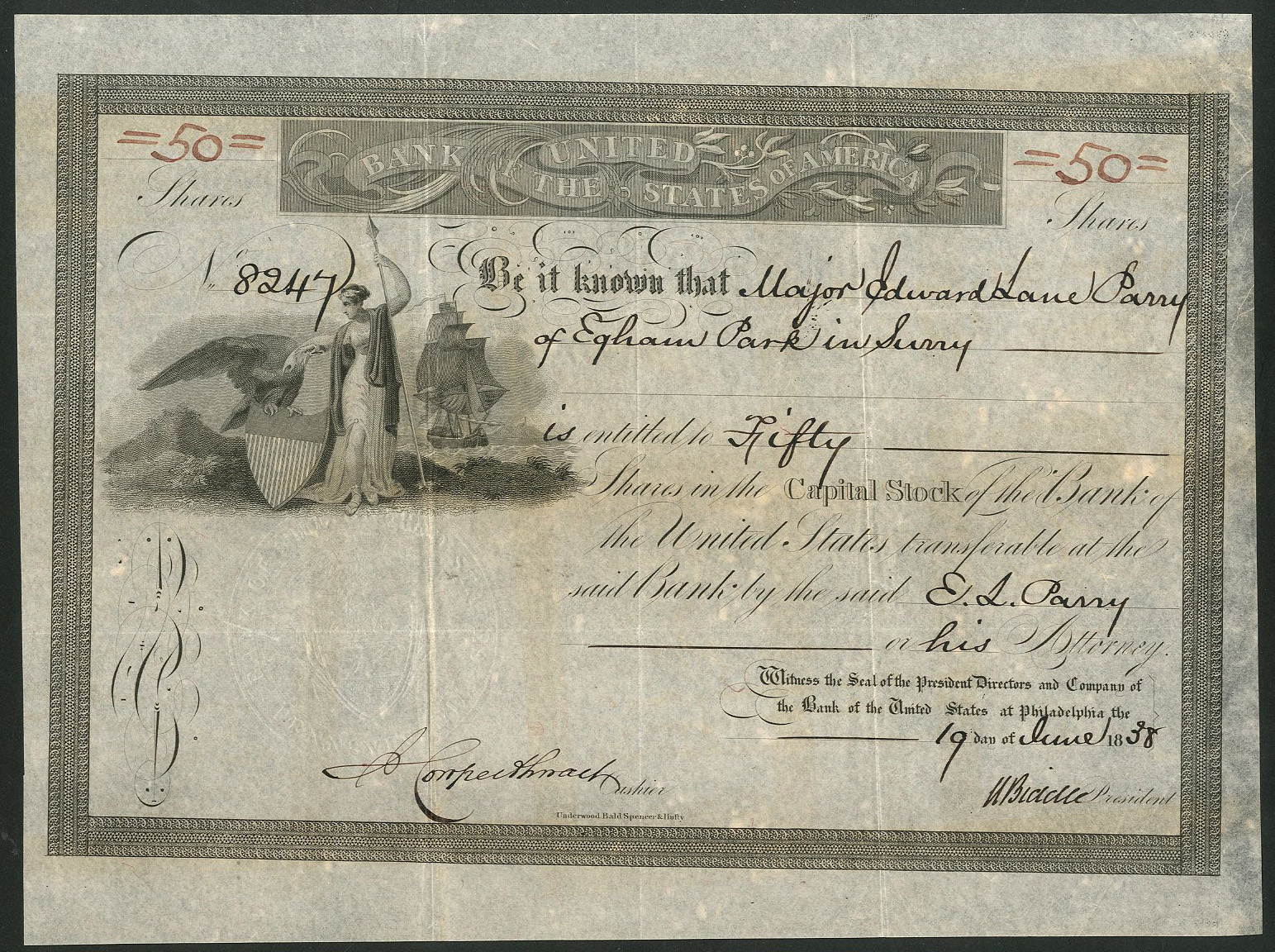
Share of the Second Bank of the United States, issued 18. June 1838, signed by Nicholas Biddle

- William Jones, January 7, 1817 – January 25, 1819
- James Fisher, January 25, 1819 – March 6, 1819 (acting)
- Langdon Cheves, March 6, 1819 – January 6, 1823
- Nicholas Biddle, January 6, 1823 – March 1836
- Matthew L. Bevan, March 1836 – 1837? (federal bank estate)
- Nicholas Biddle, March 1836 – February 1839
- Thomas Dunlap, March 1839 – February 1841
- William Drayton, 1841
- James Robertson, 1841 – March 22, 1852

== Terms of charter ==
The Second Bank was America's national bank, comparable to the Bank of England and the Bank of France, with one key distinction – the United States government owned one-fifth (20 percent) of its capital. Whereas other national banks of that era were wholly private, the Second Bank was more characteristic of a government bank.

Under its charter, the bank had a capital limit of $35 million, $7.5 million of which represented the government-owned share. It was required to remit a "bonus" payment of $1.5 million, payable in three installments, to the government for the privilege of using the public funds, interest free, in its private banking ventures. The institution was answerable for its performance to the U.S. Treasury and Congress and subject to Treasury Department inspection.

As exclusive fiscal agent for the federal government, it provided a number of services as part of its charter, including holding and transfer of all U.S. deposits, payment and receipt of all government transactions, and processing of tax payments. In other words, the bank was "the depository of the federal government, which was its principal stockholder and customer."

The chief personnel for the bank comprised 25 directors, five of whom were appointed by the President of the United States, subject to Senate approval. Federally appointed directors were barred from acting as officials in other banks. Two of the three Bank presidents, William Jones and Nicholas Biddle, were chosen from among these government directors.

Headquartered in Philadelphia, the bank was authorized to establish branch offices where it deemed suitable, and these were immune from state taxation.

== Regulatory mechanisms ==
The primary regulatory task of the Second Bank, as chartered by Congress in 1816, was to restrain the uninhibited proliferation of paper money (bank notes) by state or private lenders, which was highly profitable to these institutions. In this capacity, the bank would preside over this democratization of credit, contributing to a vast and profitable disbursement of bank loans to farmers, small manufacturers and entrepreneurs, encouraging rapid and healthy economic expansion. Historian Bray Hammond describes the mechanism by which the bank exerted its anti-inflationary influence:

Receiving the checks and notes of local banks deposited with the [Bank] by government collectors of revenue, the [Bank] had constantly to come back on the local banks for settlements of the amounts which the checks and notes called for. It had to do so because it made those amounts immediately available to the Treasury, wherever desired. Since settlement by the local banks was in specie i.e. silver and gold coin, the pressure for settlement automatically regulated local banking lending: for the more the local banks lent the larger amount of their notes and checks in use and the larger the sums they had to settle in specie. This loss of specie reduced their power to lend.

Under this banking regime, the impulse towards over-speculation, with the risks of creating a national financial crisis, would be avoided, or at least mitigated. It was just this mechanism that the local private banks found objectionable, because it yoked their lending strategies to the fiscal operations of the national government, requiring them to maintain adequate gold and silver reserves to meet their debt obligations to the U.S. Treasury. The proliferation of private-sector banking institutions – from 31 banks in 1801 to 788 in 1837 – meant that the Second Bank faced strong opposition from this sector during the Jackson administration.

== Architecture ==
- Second Bank of the United States
- U.S. National Register of Historic Places
- U.S. National Historic Landmark
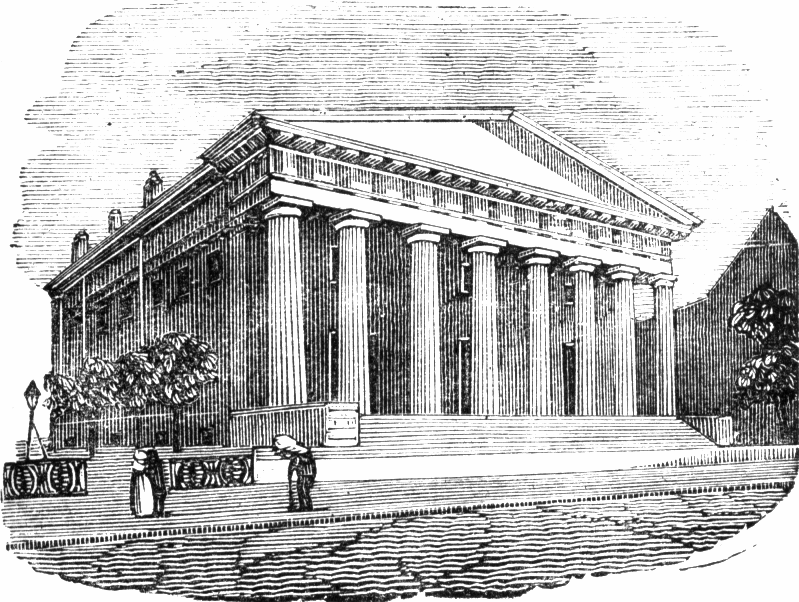
- Drawing in an 1875 book
- Location: 420 Chestnut Street; Philadelphia, Pennsylvania
- Built: 1818–1824
- Architect: William Strickland
- Architectural style: Greek Revival
- NRHP reference No.: 87001293

Significant dates
- Added to NRHP: May 4, 1987
- Designated NHL: May 4, 1987

The architect of the Second Bank was William Strickland (1788–1854), a former student of Benjamin Latrobe (1764–1820), the man who is often called the first professionally trained American architect. Latrobe and Strickland were both disciples of the Greek Revival style. Strickland went on to design many other American public buildings in this style, including financial structures such as the Mechanics National Bank (also in Philadelphia). He also designed the second building for the main U.S. Mint in Philadelphia in 1833, as well as the New Orleans, Dahlonega, and Charlotte branch mints in the mid-to-late 1830s.

Strickland's design for the Second Bank is in essence based on the Parthenon in Athens, and is a significant early and monumental example of Greek Revival architecture. The hallmarks of the Greek Revival style can be seen immediately in the north and south façades, which use a large set of steps leading up to the main level platform, known as the stylobate. On top of these, Strickland placed eight severe Doric columns, which are crowned by an entablature containing a triglyph frieze and simple triangular pediment. The building appears much as an ancient Greek temple, hence the stylistic name. The interior consists of an entrance hallway in the center of the north façade flanked by two rooms on either side. The entry leads into two central rooms, one after the other, that span the width of the structure east to west. The east and west sides of the first large room are each pierced by a large arched fan window. The building's exterior uses Pennsylvania blue marble, which, due to the manner in which it was cut, has begun to deteriorate due to weak parts of the stone being exposed to the elements. This phenomenon is most visible on the Doric columns of the south façade. Construction lasted from 1819 to 1824.

The Greek Revival style used for the Second Bank contrasts with the earlier, Federal style in architecture used for the First Bank of the United States, which also still stands and is located nearby in Philadelphia. This can be seen in the more Roman-influenced Federal structure's ornate, colossal Corinthian columns of its façade, which is also embellished by Corinthian pilasters and a symmetric arrangement of sash windows piercing the two stories of the façade. The roofline is also topped by a balustrade, and the heavy modillions adorning the pediment give the First Bank an appearance more like a Roman villa than a Greek temple.

== Current building use ==
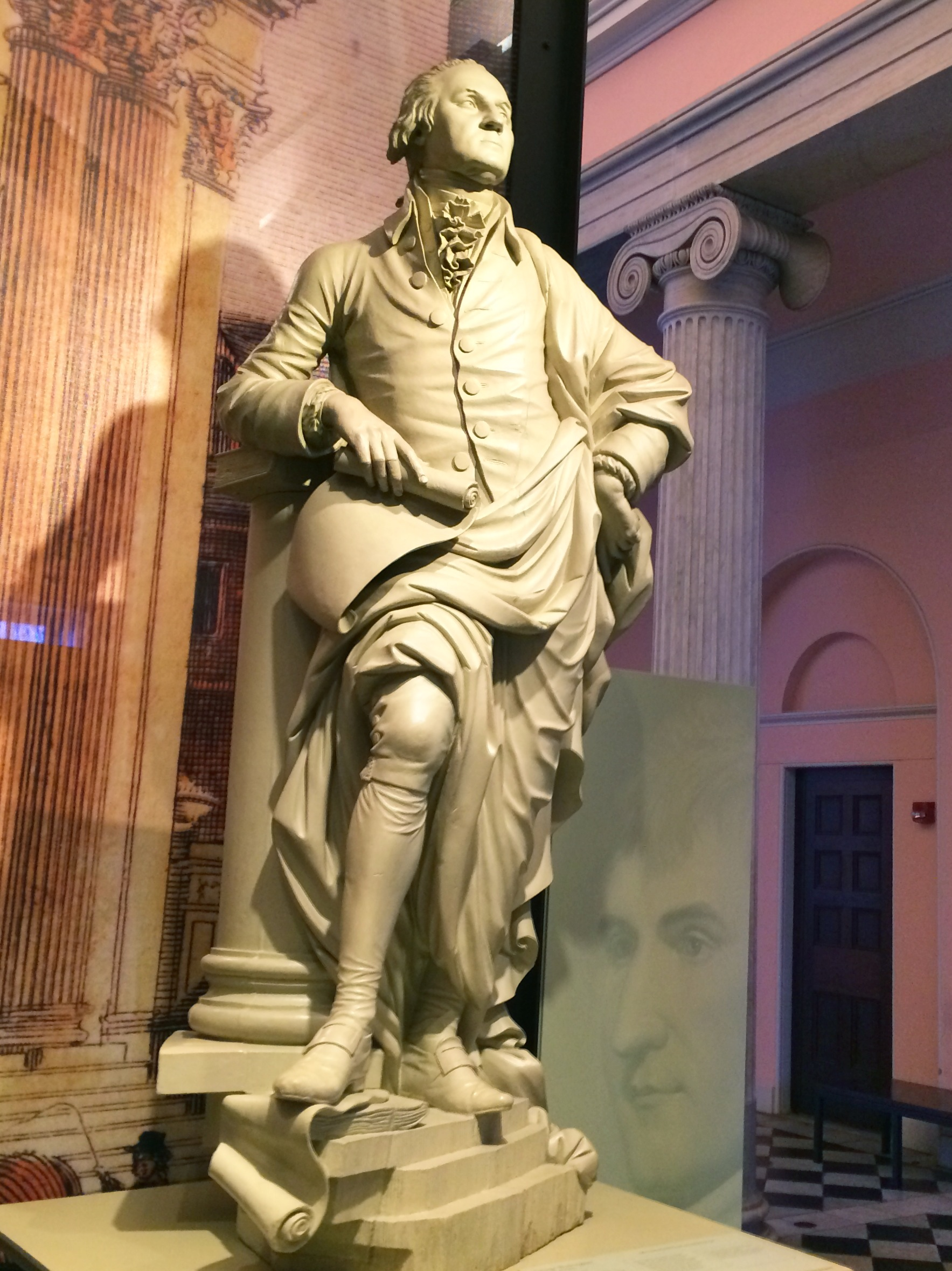
Statue of George Washington, an 1815 wooden statue by William Rush on display at the Second Bank of the United States

Since the bank's closing in 1841, the edifice has performed a variety of functions. Today, it is part of Independence National Historical Park in Philadelphia. The structure is open to the public free of charge and serves as an art gallery, housing a large collection of portraits of prominent early Americans painted by Charles Willson Peale and many others. The portrait gallery also includes the wooden statue of George Washington by William Rush.

The building was designated a National Historic Landmark in 1987 for its architectural and historic significance.

The Wall Street branch in New York City was converted into the United States Assay Office before it was demolished in 1915. The federal-style façade was saved and installed in the American Wing of the Metropolitan Museum of Art in 1924.

== In popular culture ==
The Second Bank building was described by Charles Dickens in a chapter of his 1842 travelogue American Notes on Philadelphia and its solitary prison:

We reached the city, late that night. Looking out of my chamber-window, before going to bed, I saw, on the opposite side of the way, a handsome building of white marble, which had a mournful ghost-like aspect, dreary to behold. I attributed this to the sombre influence of the night, and on rising in the morning looked out again, expecting to see its steps and portico thronged with groups of people passing in and out. The door was still tight shut, however; the same cold cheerless air prevailed: and the building looked as if the marble statue of Don Guzman could alone have any business to transact within its gloomy walls. I hastened to inquire its name and purpose, and then my surprise vanished. It was the Tomb of many fortunes; the Great Catacomb of investment; the memorable United States Bank.

The stoppage of this bank, with all its ruinous consequences, had cast (as I was told on every side) a gloom on Philadelphia, under the depressing effect of which it yet laboured. It certainly did seem rather dull and out of spirits.

== See also ==
- Banking in the Jacksonian Era
- Federal Reserve
- Federal Reserve Act
- First Bank of the United States
- History of central banking in the United States
- List of National Historic Landmarks in Philadelphia
- McCulloch v. Maryland
- National Register of Historic Places listings in Center City, Philadelphia
- Panic of 1837

== Bibliography ==
- Brown, William Horace (1912). The Story of a Bank.
- Browning, Andrew H. (2019). The Panic of 1819: The First Great Depression. University of Missouri. ISBN 978-0-8262-2183-4. online review
- Bodenhorn, Howard (2000). A History of Banking in Antebellum America: Financial Markets and Economic Development in an Era of Nation-Building.
- Campbell, Stephen W. (2019). The Bank War and the Partisan Press: Newspapers, Financial Institutions, and the Post Office in Jacksonian America. Lawrence, KS: University Press of Kansas. OCLC 1066117752.
- Catterall, Ralph C. H. (1902). The Second Bank of the United States. University of Chicago.
- Dangerfield, George (1966). The Awakening of American Nationalism: 1815–1828. New York: Harper & Row. ISBN 978-0-88133-823-2.
- Dickens, Charles (1913). American Notes for General Circulation. p. 81 – via Gutenberg.
- Feller, Daniel. "The Bank War", in Julian E. Zelizer, ed. The American Congress (2004), pp 93–111.
- Gallery, John Andrew, ed. (2004), Philadelphia Architecture: A Guide to the City (2nd ed.), Philadelphia: Foundation for Architecture, ISBN 0962290815
- Govan, Thomas Payne (1959). Nicolas Biddle, Nationalist and Public Banker, 1786–1844. Chicago: University of Chicago Press.
- Hall, David A.; Clarke, Matthew St Clair (1832). Legislative and Documentary History of the Bank of the United States. Gales and Seaton. ISBN 978-1-296-74384-0.
- Hammond, Bray (May 1947). "Jackson, Biddle, and the Bank of the United States". The Journal of Economic History. 7 (1): 1–23. doi:10.1017/S0022050700053420. JSTOR 2113597. S2CID 155058579. in Essays on Jacksonian America. New York: Frank Otto Gatell, Holt, Rinehart and Winston, Inc. 1970.
- Hammond, Bray (1956). "Jackson's Fight with the Money Power". American Heritage. 8 (4).
- Hammond, Bray (1957). Banks and Politics in America, from the Revolution to the Civil War. Princeton University Press.
- Hammond, Bray (1953). "The Second Bank of the United States". Transactions of the American Philosophical Society. 43 (1): 80–85. doi:10.2307/1005664. JSTOR 1005664.
- Hill, Andrew T. (December 4, 2015). "The First Bank of the United States". Federal Reserve History.
- Hofstadter, Richard (1948). Great Issues in American History: From the Revolution to the Civil War, 1765–1865.
- "Historic Philadelphia Tour: Second Bank of the United States". ushistory.org. Independence Hall Association.
- Kahan, Paul. The Bank War: Andrew Jackson, Nicholas Biddle, and the Fight for American Finance (Yardley: Westholme, 2016. xii, 187 pp.
- Killenbeck, Mark R. (2006). M'Culloch v. Maryland: Securing a Nation. Lawrence, KS: University Press of Kansas.
- Knodell, Jane Ellen (2017). The Second Bank of the United States: "Central" Banker in an Era of Nation Building, 1816–1836. Routledge. online review Archived July 17, 2018, at the Wayback Machine
- McGrane, Reginald C., ed. (1919). The Correspondence of Nicholas Biddle.
- McGraw, Thomas K. (2012). The Founders of Finance: How Hamilton, Gallatin, and Other Immigrants Forged a New Economy. Cambridge, MA: Harvard University Press. pp. 315–320. ISBN 978-0-674-06692-2.
- Meyers, Marvin (Spring 1953). "The Jacksonian Persuasion". American Quarterly. 5 (1): 3–15. doi:10.2307/3031286. JSTOR 3031286. in Essays on Jacksonian America. New York: Frank Otto Gatell, Holt, Rinehart and Winston, Inc. 1970.
- Minicucci, Stephen (October 2004). "Internal Improvements and the Union, 1790–1860". Studies in American Political Development. 18 (2). Cambridge University Press: 160–185. doi:10.1017/S0898588X04000094. S2CID 144902648.
- "Pennsylvania Blue Marble". Second Bank of the United States. National Park Service. Archived from the original on June 4, 2009.
- "NHL nomination for Second Bank of the United States". National Park Service.
- "National Register Information System". National Register of Historic Places. National Park Service. March 15, 2006.
- The Second Bank of the United States: A Chapter in the History of Central Banking (PDF). Federal Reserve Bank of Philadelphia. January 2021.
- Ratner, Sidney, James H. Soltow, and Richard Sylla. The Evolution of the American Economy: Growth, Welfare, and Decision Making. (1993)
- Remini, Robert V. (1967). Andrew Jackson and the Bank War: A Study in the Growth of Presidential Power. New York: W. W. Norton & Company. ISBN 978-0-393-09757-3.
- Remini, Robert V. (1981). Andrew Jackson and the Course of American Freedom, 1822–1832. vol. II. New York: Harper & Row.
- Remini, Robert V. (1984). Andrew Jackson and the Course of American Freedom, 1833–1845. vol. III. New York: Harper & Row.
- Remini, Robert V. (1993). Henry Clay: Statesman for the Union. New York: W. W. Norton & Company.
- Schlesinger, Arthur Meier Jr. (1945). Age of Jackson.
- Schweikart, Larry. Banking in the American South from the Age of Jackson to Reconstruction (1987)
- Taylor; George Rogers, ed. Jackson Versus Biddle: The Struggle over the Second Bank of the United States (1949).
- Temin, Peter. The Jacksonian Economy (1969)
- Walters, Raymond (1945). "The origins of the Second Bank of the United States". Journal of Political Economy. 53 (2): 115–131. doi:10.1086/256246. JSTOR 1825049. S2CID 153635866.
- Wellman, Paul I. (1966) [1984]. The House Divides: The Age of Jackson and Lincoln. New York: Doubleday and Company.
- Wilburn, Jean Alexander (1967). Biddle's Bank: The Crucial Years.
- Wilentz, Sean (2005). The Rise of American Democracy: Jefferson to Lincoln. New York: W.W. Horton and Company.
