= Linda MacDonald =

Linda MacDonald, California painter and textile artist

Linda MacDonald (1946) is an American artist noted for her early work and participation in the Studio Quilt Art movement, and her environmentally themed paintings, specifically Redwood trees.

== Early life and education ==
Even the Old Growth Must Work for its Keep

MacDonald grew up in a small town called Willits, located in Mendicino County, California. She grew up in a household with quilts but "took their presence for granted" along with other family skills such as "knitting, crochet, and dressmaking." As a child, MacDonald's "early successes were art-related." She competitively won the rank as "class artist" and teachers called on her when they "needed drawings for their classroom." She "learned to sew from her mother (as) clothing was expensive" and could more economically be made at home.

MacDonald's formal education in art began at San Francisco State University but was interrupted by the "riots of the 1960s". She moved with her husband, Robert Comings, also a multi-media artist, to a "rural country existence" in Mendocino County in northern California gave her the opportunity to finish her Bachelor of Arts degree in 1978. MacDonald eventually received a teaching credential from Dominican University (1985, San Rafael, CA) allowing her to teach high school in "art and other subjects," She then pursued an MFA, also from San Francisco State University (1992), specializing in textiles. MacDonald taught art for three semesters at San Francisco State.

== Artwork ==
Linda MacDonald "is best known for her environmental work" born of her experience living in northern California. Most of her work—whether textile, on paper, or paintings— portrays California’s native environment, such as Redwood trees.

The 2021 exhibition catalog for Women Eco Artists Dialog: The Legacy of Jo Hanson at Yolo Arts in Woodland, California states, "Linda MacDonald paints the interiors of redwood trees, Coast and Sequoia for their shapes, colors, and incredible beauty. The history of their aging is in the wood: marred, burned and charred, graffiti-laden, smooth, textured or curly. Logging was a large economic force in early California and still is. The old redwoods still intact show the changes created by human-produced climate and population forces and are the symbols of longevity, resilience within strife, and nature in all its glory," and about her process "relishes the experience of visiting groves, traveling through California, and recording these amazing behemoths. She reveals these survivors and portrays their experience through the visual records of her paintings. She photographs, sketches and records the interiors of these trees and then, back in her studio, prints images of them as source material for her watercolors and large oils."

Gallery Route One in Point Reyes, California, highlighted MacDonald's work in a one-person show in 2010 called, "Linda MacDonald: Stories from the North Woods.” This mixed-media exhibition included drawings, paintings, fiber, and eco-graphics. Her fiber section used “tongue-in-cheek humor to state the obvious.” MacDonald's unique vantage born of literally living and "(working) on the edge" of the forests of Mendocino County informs her environmental art including a series on the Spotted Owl called, Spotted Owl vs. The Chain Saw.

Quilts highlighting environmental themes such as oil drilling followed her "series of quilts with a logging theme" called, "What is Happening to the Trees?" She has a gift of approaching these sensitive subjects with "a playful sense of humor." An example of this is Even the Old Growth Must Work for Its Keep.

Another important fiber series, Trees, Lumber, Houses, and People "tells a story in a dozen chapters" chronicling the life of a forest being decimated by logging until it is eventually "the inevitable forest of stumps."

MacDonald's early exhibitions were in the county museum of her hometown of Willits. Annual shows curated by Sandra Metzler, the first president of the American Quilt Study Group, gave her encouragement. Initially, as she approached galleries, she could not say, "she made quilts" as she would then not be considered a serious artist. Her preference is to show her quilts as part of multi-media exhibits including "craft, painting, drawing, and printmaking."

Linda MacDonald, an "artist, who began as a painter, switched to textiles in the 1980s, and soon combined the two," primarily painting on traditional canvas as of 2013.

=== Art quilts ===
MacDonald was at the forefront of the studio quilt art movements. Initially, she was "aware of the national and California art scenes" as well as the 1965 beginnings of the studio art quilt movement, "an art form that uses traditional quilting techniques to create art objects." She chose to "forget all about it (the movement) and just work from (her) daily life (and) experiences." In retrospect, she, along with others such as Jean Ray Laury, Yvonne Porcella, and Therese May, drove the California art quilt revolution while others were doing the same thing in New England and Ohio. She realized her art training could be used on textiles. MacDonald eventually expanded her repertoire to add art quilter to her career as an artist.

In 1974 she joined "a feminist consciousness-raising group" where she was introduced to quilt making. She tried the craft at home using a book by Michael James, The Quiltmaker's Handbook. She recalled, "His first book was invaluable because (it) showed us how to stack all the pinned pieces . . . and (to) sew them in long flags" and "his work was important . . . because it was contemporary." She initially made a crazy quilt then "made a few more quilts but began designing her own repeat blocks rather than copying old ones." She soon realized "she was gratified by the warm reception viewers gave to quilts." She noticed, "the difference in feeling between a person looking at a drawing and a person looking at a quilt was really remarkable. There is no distance between a person and fabric, especially when it has all these romantic and nostalgic feelings." It became apparent that it was fairly "easy to sew while she was home with her young children." Initially, "she worked in relative isolation, not realizing other artists were making quilts." She used her skills as an artist to create "geometric designs in fiber." Before long, this art quilter "exploited new technology." Her quilts "evolved from colorful pieced work exploring decidedly modern geometric constructions to largely monochromatic abstractions painted with an airbrush."

==== Quilt artist phases ====
Nancy Bavor's master's thesis, The California Art Quilt Revolution identified three stylistic phases in Linda MacDonald's work as a quilt artist. The initial phase of creating large three-dimensional landscapes soon gave way to her second phase using an airbrush to "(render) fanciful monochrome figures on fabric that she then assembled into quilts." Her third phase continued use of the airbrush as the "imagery and message evolved" using "recognizable northern California plants and animals" in her art. She was particularly interested in highlighting the "intense logging and its effect on the Mendocino forests that surrounded her, and the small town where she lives . . . using sensitivity and a sense of humor (to defuse) some of the community tension." Author Sandra Sider commented on MacDonald's "fierce environmentalism" that manifested itself in the comforting folds of fabric. One of the shows she has exhibited in was called "Soft Protests" at the New England Quilt Museum in Lowell, Massachusetts.

Like other artists and quilt artists of the day, MacDonald did not expect to make a living selling her art or teaching quilting skills. Her passion for art became the reason for doing it. "The need to do art, which I think is universal, is one of the main reasons for being alive . . . that aesthetic experience, that excitement."

== Exhibitions ==
Her quilts have been exhibited in prestigious galleries nationwide in the decades beginning in the 1980s including San Jose's "American Museum of Quilts & Textiles." She has exhibited numerous times in "Quilt National" in Athens, Ohio, and "Visions" in Oceanside, California, the country's premier venues for art quilt exhibitions. Her prolific career has included a dozen solo, two, and three-person exhibitions; awards from exhibitions in Ohio and Tokyo; inclusion in over 100 exhibitions; images published in almost 50 books and magazines; as well as having her art in permanent collections in The Museum of Art & Design (New York, NY), The White House (Washington, D.C.), and the City of San Francisco.

A 2013 mixed-media exhibition at Mendocino College Art Gallery, Linda MacDonald: Images of a Changing California, called her “a prominent Mendocino artist who has been actively involved in creating art focused on strong ecological themes in a whimsical and poignant manner.” The show, curated by Paula Gray, subtitled, 20 years of art from ecological concerns to homespun whimsy contained 46 pieces of MacDonald's art.

== Additional Reading ==
- Bavor, Nancy (2011). The California Art Quilt Revolution (MA thesis). Lincoln: University of Nebraska.
- Bay Area Women's Legacy Project
