= Joan Schulze =

American artist, lecturer, and poet (born 1936)

- Born: 13 October 1936 (age 90); Chicago, Illinois
- Education: University of Illinois at Urbana-Champaign
- Known for: Fiber art, Quilt Art, Collage
- Awards: Fresno Art Museum's Distinguished Woman Artist of 2017
- Website: joan-of-arts.com

Joan Schulze (born October 13, 1936) is an American artist, lecturer, and poet. Schulze's career spans over five decades. She is best known for her career in contemporary quilting and collage. Schulze was named a “pioneer of the art quilt movement” by Constance Howard. Her work is in galleries and private collections worldwide, including the Renwick Gallery/Smithsonian Institution in Washington DC, the Museum of Arts and Design in New York, & the Oakland Museum of California.

== Early life and education ==
Schulze was born in Chicago, Illinois. During her high school years, Schulze was introduced to sewing in a home economics class that taught her how to fashion her own articles of clothing. After her graduation from Chicago's Lindblom Technical High School in 1954, Schulze went on to earn her bachelor's degree in education from the University of Illinois at Urbana-Champaign in 1958. Immediately upon her graduation from college, Schulze began to work as an elementary school teacher.

== Career ==
=== Early years ===
Schulze relocated to California from Texas in 1966 and was inspired by the picturesque terrain that California offered. Schulze received no formal training and little art instruction. She began honing her sewing and embroidery skills through workshops in the Peninsula Stitchery Guild, as well as the Bay Area Arts and Crafts Guild, of which she became president in the mid-1970's. Schulze made her first quilt in 1974 after she was approached to teach an adult education class on quilt-making. Her first attempt at quilting came as an exercise of preparation to teach the class.

=== Artistic development and mature work ===
Throughout her career, Schulze has experimented with collage, fiber art, quilt-making, printmaking, dyeing, photography, painting, Xerox transfer, and digital technology.

While she is best known for her contemporary quilt art, Schulze is a life-long collage artist. As a child, she would clip images from the Sears Roebuck catalog and save them for collages. Since then, Schulze continues to amass a supply of ephemera with the intention to implement these fragments in her work. Writer Sarah E. Tucker likens her tendency toward improvisation to that of a jazz musician.

While film, point-and-shoot, and phone cameras have all served Schulze, she cites the photocopier as her “favorite and most important camera.” Starting in the mid 90's, Schulze began to create line drawings by making photocopies of stitched organza and printing these manipulated images onto silk, in what the artist refers to “toner drawings.”

=== Teaching and lectures ===
Schulze has been a conference and symposium keynote speaker at international institutions and has played the role of visiting artist, artist-in-residence, cultural specialist, & juror.

Schulze began to teach and lecture as an artist starting in 1970 and retired in 2013 after over 40 years. She has taught classes and workshops in the United States, Canada, China, Japan, Australia, Germany, and the United Kingdom. on topics including collage, fiber art technique, quiltmaking, alternative printing, fan design & construction, and book assembly.

=== Selected awards and recognition ===
In 2017, Schulze was named the recipient of the Fresno Art Museum Council of 100 “Distinguished Woman Artist Award” of 2017. She was the first quilt artist to be named.

Schulze has received recognition from the California State Fair Fine Art Exhibitions (Silver Award); the Rochester Institute of Technology, “The Art Quilt” (Best of Show Award); Quilt National ‘95 (Innovation Award); the Bay Area Art Conservation Guild Annual (Gold Award); the Tokyo International Forum, World Quilt '98 (Gold Award); the Skylark Fine Art Gallery, 2009 (Publishing and Exhibition Prize). Schulze has also been honored with Purchase Awards from the San Jose Museum of Quilts & Textiles and the City of Palo Alto, California.

== Selected works ==
=== Selected quilts (1979—2018) ===
- California II, 1979, 96 x 96”
- No Sky in Manhattan, 1986, 90 x 79”
- Tea Time at the Cloud Hotel, 1991, 78 x 73”
- An American in Rotterdam, 1992, 70 x 52”
- Finding the Golden Edges, 1994, 56 x 57.5”
- Objects of Desire I, 1997, 44 x 38”
- Red Letter Day (Scroll), 1998, 15.5 x 61”
- Gateway Scrolls (Scroll), 1999, 72 x 24”, 96 x 24”, 120 x 24”
- Fast... Faster..., 2001, 48 x 81”
- Angel Drawings, 2003, 48 x 44”
- Frameworks B, 2004, 14.5 x 18”
- Tranquility, 2005, 15 x 17”
- Water Lilies, 2006, 48 x 71”
- Butterfly Logic, 2006, 46 x 44”
- Promises, 2007, 44.25 x 54.5”
- Women in Black, 2008, 29 x 50”
- Visitors, 2009, 44 x 84”
- What We Miss, 2010, 34.5 x 44.5”
- Baring One’s Soul, 2013, 34.5 x 43.5”
- Seven Bowls, 2015, 15 x 17”
- Privileged Spaces, 2016, 42 x 52”
- Opus (Center), 2016, 94 x 134”
- The Unknowable Future, 2017, 48 x 64.5”
- Eye, 2018, 16.5 x 21”

== Exhibitions ==
=== Selected solo and featured exhibitions ===
- Tsinghua University Art Museum, Beijing, China, 2018
- Celebrating 80, Fresno Art Museum, Fresno, California, 2017 - 2018
- Joan Schulze: Poetic License, Shenzhen University Art Gallery & Museum, Shenzhen, China, 2016
- Disappearing Conversations, Goodman 2 Art Building, San Francisco, California, 2015
- San Jose Museum of Quilts & Textiles, Retrospective, San Jose, California, 2010
- iQuilt—iDraw, the original fiction of Joan Schulze, Ararat Regional Art Museum, Melbourne, Australia, 2007
- National Exhibition Centre, Festival of Quilts, Birmingham, England, 2005
- Cornell College, Mt. Vernon, Iowa, 2003
- Washington State University Art Museum, Pullman, Washington, 2001
- Joan Schulze: The New Haiku, One Hundred Collages, Andrea Schwartz Gallery, San Francisco, California, 2000
- Textilforum (The Danish Textile Museum), Herning, Denmark, 1999-2000
- Galerie Smend, Cologne, Germany, 1999
- Gayle Willson Gallery, Southampton, New York, 1981, 1983, 1987, 1999
- Smith Andersen Gallery, Palo Alto, California, 1993

=== Selected group exhibitions ===
- Quilt National, Dairy Barn Arts Center, Athens, Ohio, 2021, 2019, 2017, 2013, 2009, 2003
- International Fiber Art Biennale (Catalog & Juror), Tsinghua University Art Museum; Shenzhen Art Museum; Nantong, Jiangsu Province; Henan Art Museum, Suzhou University Art Museum, Shanghai Exhibition Hall, PR China, 2020, 2018, 2016, 2014, 2012, 2012, 2008, 2006, 2004
- International Fiber Arts (IX; VII), Sebastopol Center for the Arts, California, 2019, 2016
- 4th Riga International Textiles & Fibre Triennial: TRADITION & INNOVATION, Museum of Decorative Arts & Design, Riga, Latvia, 2010
- 12 Voices, Dennos Museum Center, Michigan, 2009
- Connecting Cultures and Colors, First Kyrgyz-American Quilt Exhibit, United States Embassy (Catalog), Kyrgyz Republic, 2006
- Biennale Internazionale Dell’ARTE Contemporanea, Fortezza da Basso (Catalog), Florence, Italy, 2005
- SAMPLE Exhibition (Catalog; Traveling through 2004 to: Williamson Art Gallery; Dutch Textile Museum; Hall Place, Kent), United Kingdom & Netherlands, 2003

== Collections ==
=== Selected museums ===
- Renwick Gallery/Smithsonian Institution, National Museum of American Art, Washington, DC
- Oakland Museum of California, California
- San Jose Museum of Quilts & Textiles, California
- International Quilt Study Center & Museum, Nebraska
- National Quilt Museum, Paducah, Kentucky
- Musée ArtColle, Sergines, France
- Museo de Collage, Morelos, México
- Museum of Arts & Design, New York
- Racine Art Museum, Wisconsin
- Puke Ariki Museum, New Plymouth, New Zealand

=== Selected corporate ===
- Stanford University, Palo Alto, California
- Luther College (Iowa), Decorah
- VISA International, San Francisco, California
- Adobe Systems, Inc., San Jose, California
- Queen of Apostles Catholic Church, San Jose, California
- U. S. Embassy, Addis Ababa, Ethiopia
- Isle of Daiichi Chapel, Japan
- Kaiser Permanente, San Jose, Santa Clara, CA; Denver, CO
- Palo Alto Medical Foundation, Burlingame, Fremont, & Mountain View, CA
- John M. Walsh III Collection of Contemporary Art Quilts, New York

== Publications ==
- Schulze, Joan. Celebrating 80. Schulze Press, 2017. ISBN 978-0-9744196-4-0
- Schulze, Joan. In-Between: Poems. Schulze Press, 2018. ISBN 978-0-9744196-5-7
- Schulze, Joan, and Janet De Boer. iQULIT - iDRAW: The Original Fiction of Joan Schulze (Catalogue). Ararat Regional Art Gallery, 2007.
- Schulze, Joan. Leftover Traces of Yesterday. Postcard Press, 1990.
- Schulze, Joan. Poetic License: The Art of Joan Schulze. Chinese translation by Teresa Huang, Schulze Press, 2010. ISBN 978-0-9744196-3-3 (paperback edition); ISBN 978-0-9744196-2-6 (hardcover edition)
- Schulze, Joan. Quilts. Schulze Press, 2005. ISBN 978-0-9744196-1-9
- Schulze, Joan. The Art of Joan Schulze. Custom & Limited Editions, 1999. ISBN 978-1-881529-44-6
- Schulze, Joan. Winter of Loss. Schulze Press, 2020. ISBN 978-0-9744196-6-4
