= Jean Ray Laury =

American artist and designer (1928–2011)

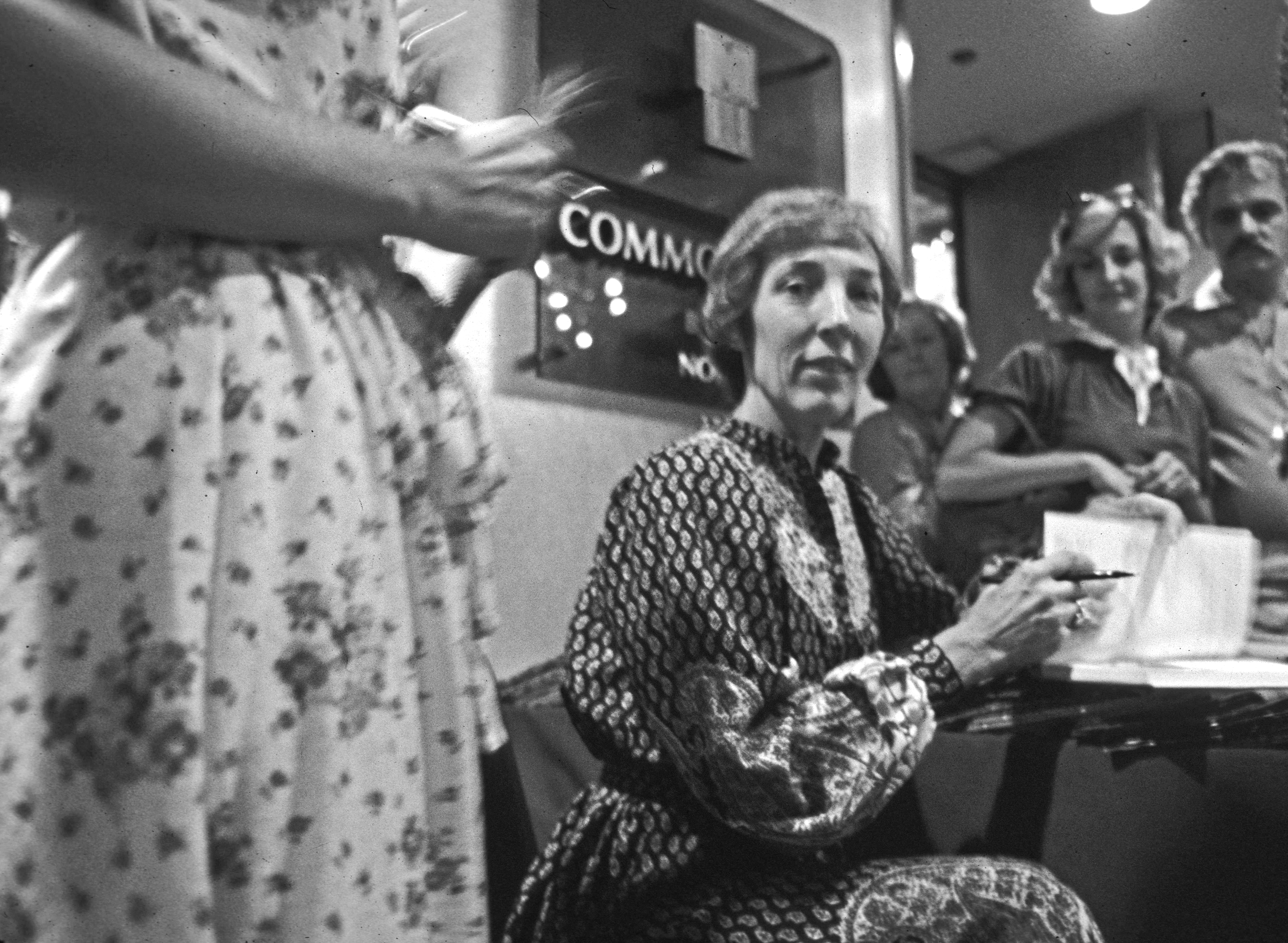
- Laury in 1978
- Born: Jean Ray; March 22, 1928; Doon, Iowa, U.S.
- Died: March 2, 2011 (aged 82)
- Education: Iowa State Teachers' College; Stanford University
- Known for: Quilting, writing
- Spouse: Frank Laury (m. 1952)
- Awards: Quilters Hall of Fame
- Website: jeanraylaury.com

Jean Ray Laury (March 22, 1928 – March 2, 2011) was an American artist and designer. She was one of the first fine artists to move to quilting as a medium of choice in the late 1950s. Her quilts followed neither traditional method nor pattern; they were bold, modern, colorful collages, often laced with humor and satire. Penning over twenty books and teaching over 2,000 workshops, Laury helped women see the creative possibilities in everyday objects and awake their sense of inspiration. Laury has been called a "foremother of a quilt revival", and "one of the pioneers" of non-traditional quilts.

== Early life and education ==
Born on March 22, 1928, in Doon, Iowa, Jean Ray Laury was the daughter of Ralph and Alice Ray. She was the second of four girls. Growing up, Laury's "mother encouraged her to 'do what you want to do, and don't do what everybody else does.'" As a child, Laury loved drawing and painting. The family moved to Oak Ridge, Tennessee, where she graduated from high school. She returned to Iowa to attend Iowa State Teachers' College (now University of Northern Iowa), where she earned her bachelor's degree in Art and English in 1950. After teaching art for several years, she moved to California. She went on to marry Frank Laury, who worked as a professor at California State University, Fresno, in 1952.

Beginning a master's program in Design at Stanford University, Laury became intrigued by the art of quilting. Laury gravitated towards quilting because it gave her the flexibility work at home and allowed her to start and stop as needed to take care of her home and children. While Laury grew up in a small community where quilting was common, she had paid little attention to quiltmaking until now. Always one to take on a challenge, Laury began experimenting with the craft. One aspect that Laury was adamant about was that she did not want to work with a pattern. Inspired by her son Tom, Laury's first quilt was an appliqué quilt called Tom's Quilt. It was filled with images familiar to children, but Laury interpreted them in a simplified contemporary style. Incorporating this quilt into her final master's degree project, Laury graduated in 1956. 'Tom's Quilt' was included in a student exhibition at the DeYoung Museum in San Francisco, and led to a solo exhibition there several years later.

Laury entered her first quilt in the 1958 Eastern States Exposition in Storrowton Village in West Springfield, Massachusetts. Although it did not win any prizes, it attracted the attention of Roxa Wright, one of the jurors and creative editor at House Beautiful magazine. Through her, Laury got commissions to design quilts for magazine projects. Later, Laury followed her to Woman's Day. Jean's designs were included in Better Homes and Gardens, Family Circle, Cosmopolitan, Needle and Craft, and many other publications.

Finding inspiration in everyday objects, Laury's mission was "to blur the lines between fine art (painting and sculpture) and decorative art (fiber, wood, glass, ceramic)." While she experimented with various mediums, Laury honed in on quiltmaking by the 1970s. In 88 Leaders in the Quilt World Today, Laury stated, "I like making quilts that grow out of everyday life, so politics, women's issues, major earthly shake-ups and humor are always part of my work. This personal involvement is what draws me to quiltmaking and keeps the field vital."

== Influence within art quilt movement ==
Laury's keen eye for art and design allowed her to see past the functional benefits of a quilt. In Ho For California!, Laury speaks to the qualities that early quilts possess beyond warmth:

Quilts, however, satisfied another need as great as that of physical warmth: the need to feel connected to family and to other generations, the need for continuity. Quilts offered a way of maintaining ties at a time when photographs were uncommon (or unknown), and the arrival of letters by mail could take months. Quilts constituted contact ... Quilts become archetypal symbols of the women who make them. They 'stand in' for the quilter, long after she is gone, revealing to descendants, viewers, or new owners the essence of the quilter – her spirit, energy, vitality, and skill.

Laury believed that "a great quilt exists when it relies on ... the principles of art that make any piece of visual work look great ... I don't see a big difference between fabric on the wall and paint on the wall." Laury stated that "art has less to do with the material used than with the perceptive and expressive abilities of the individual. Any difference between the 'fine' and the 'decorative' arts is not a matter of material, but rather what the artist brings to the material. Any media may successfully be used at any level for any purpose." Just like with "traditional" art, what is viewed as great to one person will not necessarily be viewed as great by another. Everyone has personal experiences that affect their reaction and relationship with a work of art.

Laury's quilt aesthetic is far from traditional. Taking an innovative and contemporary approach, Laury's quilts are filled with humor, wit, and contradictory images; "a world in which cartoon-like irons fly through the air emitting innocent puffs of steam, absurdly happy housewives pursue their drudgery in a dreamy state of bliss, and politicians are hoisted on their own petards." While Laury's quilts may be politically charged and confrontational, that is far from her personal demeanor. Laury relied on her quilts to showcase her stance on important issues since she struggled "to argue politics or feminism or anything else loudly and strongly in a group." The comic strip format is one that Laury continually gravitated towards. Laury utilized this format because "[n]obody turns away from comic strip format; everybody feels 'I can get this.' So they'll read what I have to say, and I can comment on things that I think are important to me or important to people in general." Laury preferred to use natural fabrics like cotton and has experimented with numerous effects including printing and stamping to achieve her desired end-appearance Her one stipulation was that the fabric remain soft and quilt-like. Overall, Laury is known as the pioneer "of silk-screened images on quilts."

Using an unconventional strategy for an artist, Laury chose not to be represented by a gallery or dealer. Because of this, Laury did not sell many of the pieces she exhibited; instead, she preferred to commission pieces with architects. While Laury's work has received much praise and recognition from the art world, she has not always felt confident about her work. In 2000, Laury stated, "I've always kind of had the impression that maybe my quilts were never going to be appropriate for a museum ... Now I've changed my mind somewhat, maybe museums are more open to quiltmaking."

One of Laury's most well-known quilts is titled 'Barefoot and Pregnant', completed in 1985. It was selected as one of America's 100 best quilts of the twentieth century during the Ultimate Quilt Search by panelists representing the Alliance for American Quilts, The American Quilt Study Group, the International Quilt Association, and the National Quilting Association. Jean Ray Laury took the soft art of quilting with "Barefoot and Pregnant" and used the best of the political/social cartoon tradition to deliver a hard message. A remark by a state politician of the time, quoted in a newspaper, inspired the artist to respond in a manner that expressed her indignation in a humorous, constructive way. Jean combines images and words to allow the viewer to be able to laugh at the absurdity of the statement. It is part of the permanent collection of the International Quilt Museum at the University of Nebraska–Lincoln.

'These is Not Art,' created in 1984, is another quilt in which Laury used humor to continue the debate, "What is art?" Silk screened around the border of the quilt is a quote she saw in the guestbook of an exhibition of contemporary paintings. "These is not art to me all these squares and things ... real art has – you know – like a Madonna in it ..." Her quilt is filled with little multicolored squares and things that are not static but dance around the surface. Laury was less concerned about the 'art' part of art quilts than she was about its message.

Laury was a prolific quilter. The International Quilt Museum at the University of Nebraska–Lincoln has 41 of her quilts in its collection, the largest public collection of quilts in the world. Michael James stated that "Jean Ray Laury was an artist, writer, poet, designer, teacher, mentor, and inspiration to countless numbers of quiltmakers and fabric artists over the last 50 years."

Part of Laury's career involved completing commissions which included "panels and murals for the United California Bank and Del Web Hotel, both in Fresno, Harrah's Clubs in Tahoe and Reno, and the Nut Tree (a restaurant/mixed use development) in California." These "public installations helped establish fiber arts as a legitimate pursuit in California."

== Empowering women and community involvement ==
With encouragement from Roxa Wright, Laury began work on her first book, Appliqué Stitchery, published in 1966.[7] The book "covered techniques and ideas not covered elsewhere." Laury's second book, Quilts and Coverlets: A Contemporary Approach was published in 1970. These first two books "framed needlework as a conscious effort against standardization." In her books, Laury emphasized the ability as well as the need of women to individualize their homes and make them less a product of mass production. Laury did not stray from the traditional ideal of family with "bread-winner father, stay-at-home wife, and kids who were the woman's responsibility to raise." During the 1960s this arrangement was still the norm, and these women were Laury's primary audience for books, magazine articles and designs. By identifying herself as an average mother and housewife, Laury offered her own path to creativity and art making as a model for other women to follow.

During the emergence of the art quilt movement, Laury sensed that she could use this art form to fuel the feminist art movement as well. Laury soon realized that networking was going to be the key to the successful growth and evolution of these movements. In Quiltmaking in America, Laury states:

That contact marked, for me, the beginning of networking—the opportunity to exchange with another quilter information of mutual interest. It offered access to information not available through known sources, and included observations, opinions, and intuitive responses that criss-crossed with one's own. It continued the tradition of sharing among quilters.

As a lecturer, Laury presented programs at colleges, universities, symposiums and conferences across the country (including Quilt National) as well as to guilds of quilters, embroiderers, designers, and weavers. She taught at California State University-Fresno, for UC Davis Extension, and the University of California, Santa Cruz.[24] In 1976 Laury was a presenter at the first event "which can be considered, in retrospect, as a national quilt conference held in Ithaca NY in conjunction with the Finger Lakes Bicentennial Quilt Exhibit". In 1977 Laury was the guest lecturer at the Lincoln Quilt Symposium in Nebraska. On that indication there were 600 participants from 40 states. Laury travelled during the 1970s, 1980s and well into the 1990s. She began teaching extensively in Canada and Europe (Belgium, France, Norway and Austria). Eventually, Laury expanded her teaching into South Africa, Australia, and Japan. As Laury stated " no matter where I was, when we talked about quilting, we talked about women's lives. Women's issues were universal."

The support Laury found while at conferences and symposia was overwhelming. Not only did she find confidantes and co-workers, but she also found lasting friends.

Because of this, Laury and Joyce Aiken decided to hold a week-long Quilt Camp in Shaver Lake, California, in 1973. Laury's "Quilt Camp" brochure stated the workshops were about fiber arts, but became support groups and consciousness raising groups. Even though two men applied, she chose to limit enrollment to women. She felt that "the all female environment encouraged sharing, as many women were hesitant or reluctant to express themselves openly and would defer to men when they were present". The pair decided to make this an annual event, and Aiken continued to help until 1998. Laury's "daughter Lizbeth and friend Susan Macy" stepped in and helped until the last camp was held in 2002.

Overall, Laury was known as an instigator. She helped women realize that they could be creative without sacrificing their responsibilities at home. "She encouraged women to mine their worlds for inspiration by introducing them to the extremely fertile interior landscape of their own imaginations ... She suggested treating chores as a time to think." She wanted to help women uncover creative avenues in their everyday lives that they never knew existed. She also "encouraged women to get out and attend exhibitions, to look at work they likes, but more importantly, to spend time in front of the work they didn't like." This exercise would help them form their own opinions and begin to build their own signature aesthetic.

In addition to focusing on networking and community building opportunities, Laury was involved in countless other aspects of the art quilt movement. She was a writer for Quilters Newsletter during the 80s and 90s, curated exhibits including the Bushveldt To Kop: Quilts of South Africa at the Fresno Art Museum in 1993, and "donated her personal papers on children's books to the Arne Nixon Center for the Study of Children's Literature at Henry Madden Library California State University, Fresno." With her vast accomplishments and involvements, Laury has been recognized as one of the most pivotal members of the development art quilt movement.

== Influential writer ==
Laury started by "writing a diary in elementary school and, in one form or another, continued writing her entire life. She kept quiltmaking journals and daily diaries, wrote dozens of poems and short stories, and especially enjoyed corresponding with other quiltmakers." Laury stated "[p]utting thoughts and ideas into words give them importance and validity." Laury's writing style was conversational and usually tinged with humor. Like her teaching methods, her books and articles describe more than techniques. She intertwined "how to" instruction with philosophy, encouraged her readers to be original, value their work, explore and take creative risks. Her approach inspired many readers, including young artists who embraced the quilt as their primary means of expression as well as others who wanted to incorporate creativity into their everyday lives.

One of Laury's most significant books was The Creative Women's Getting-It-All-Together at Home Handbook written in 1977. In a review of this book by Bonnie Lehman in Quilter's Newsletter Magazine, Lehman wrote "It is a marvelous book. I wept over it and I laughed over it, and think anyone, male or female who has ever tried to do work at home will not be able to get through it without a tear or a smile." In the same article, in a review by Beth Gutcheon, Gutcheon also related a story about a woman who was asked if the book changed her life and she answered "Yes. It did." Gutcheon states "I couldn't have put it better myself".

Another notable book that Laury was involved in writing was Ho For California! Pioneer Women and Their Quilts. In her preface, Laury states "Quilts become archetypal symbols of the women who made them. They "stand in" for the quilter, long after she is gone, revealing to descendants, viewers, or new owners the essence of the quilter – her spirit, energy, vitality, and skill."

Laury wrote extensively for Quilter's Newsletter Magazine with a series of essays titled "Keeping it All Together" beginning in May 1982 through March 1984; these essays were reprinted in book form in 1983. Her series of essays, "Talking it Over," began in April 1984 and ran through December 1990. Laury also wrote children's books and poetry, including No Dragons on My Quilt (1990) and her notable "Sunbonnet Sue" series. During her career Laury wrote/co-authored 25 books. In an interview conducted for the "Quilters Save Our Stories Project" established by the Alliance for American Quilts, Laury stated "I probably like writing as much as anything. I love writing."

== Death ==
While Laury was recognized internationally as a pioneer of the art quilt movement, her life mission was simply to inspire others to see the greatness and artistic abilities within themselves. "She encouraged all quiltmakers to apply art principles: pattern, color, texture, rhythm, line; to quilts, and to incorporate painting, printmaking and photographic techniques in their work." Her commitment to teaching, hosting seminars and workshops, and writing, allowed her to impact the lives of thousands of women. By infusing her lectures and workshops with "anecdotes from her own life's balancing act, juggling deadlines and dirty dishes, parenting and artistic problem solving," Laury was able to connect with her audience on a personal level. Most importantly, Laury emphasized the significance of courage, "the courage we all need to know ourselves, to understand and pursue our own dreams, to face our challenges and our fears, and, in the end, to the courage it takes to grow old." Laury's commitment to quiltmaking paved the way for future generations of studio art quilters.

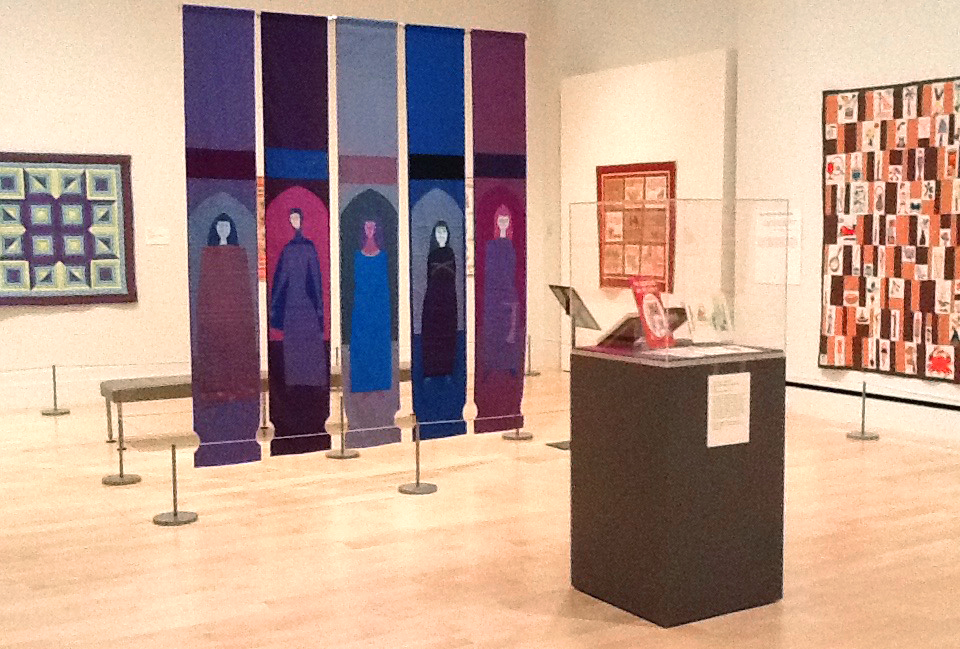
Installation view of the exhibition "Jean Ray Laury: Getting It All Together" at the International Quilt Museum at the University of Nebraska–Lincoln in 2012.

Due to respiratory complications, Laury died on March 2, 2011, at the age of 82. Knowing she was ill, Laury prepared her own obituary, published in The Fresno Bee:

I Write This For My Many Friends

Don't mourn for me. I have had a long and happy life, a wonderful family, and an exciting and satisfying career. My family includes Frank, my husband for most of over 60 years, who has always been incredibly supportive, helpful, and fun to live with. Our son Tom is a voracious reader, and for more than forty years a beekeeper. Tom's wife, Dr. Ritva Laury is a linguist who divides her time between Fresno and the University of Helsinki, Finland. Our daughter Lizabeth Laury works with horses and writes. Mike Brown teaches chemistry and physics at Washington Union High School. Ritva and Mike are very special additions to our family. Our granddaughter Anna Laury, M.D. completed her final boards in 2010 and pursues her career in Boston. Her sister, Emma Laury, J.D. graduated in May 2010 from law school, passed the California Bar and now works at OSHA in Washington, D.C.

Among my most cherished friends of many years are partner and co-author on several books, Joyce Aiken; the talented and remarkable Stan Bitters, a diamond covered in clay dust; and Ruth Law, Los Angeles toymaker, and friend for over sixty years. It's been wonderful working with fellow artists and writers. My Book Club, which has met for over forty years, has been special, and I've enjoyed our discussion group, Dry Creek Seminar, and my writing groups. I have always loved writing, and have had numerous books published, and many articles, parodies and essays. It has been a constant in my life. I recently completed a collection of stories, titled "Growing up in Doon, the 1930s: A Quilter's Memoir" about life in Iowa with my sisters, Jackie, Joan and Joyce.

My quilting career gave me the opportunity to travel the world: Japan, Australia, Canada, Norway, France, England, South Africa and many other countries. Quilting friends from across the United States have been an important part of my life, having always been enthusiastic and supportive in whatever I did. I was never far from home when I was with quilters. As wonderful as teaching and traveling were, getting back to Fresno felt like coming home. It has been wonderful being here with you. To all of you, thanks for being with me on this journey.

== Selected quilts 1975–2003 ==
- Cherry Wreath Quilt, c. 1976
- Valentine Quilt, c. 1976
- Cherries Quilt, c. 1980
- Persephones Spring, c. 1980, IQSCM: 2010.014.0012
- Log Cabin Variation, c. 1980
- Starfire, c. 1981, IQSCM: 1997.007.1031
- The Medallion Quilt, c. 1981
- Boxed Illusion, c. 1981
- House Quilt, c. 1984
- Doppler Effect #1, c. 1984, IQSCM: 1997.007.1033
- Butterfly Quilt, c. 1984
- These is Not Art, c. 1984
- Seven Camels Heading West, c. 1984
- Coalinga Earthquake #3, c. 1984
- Light Shower, c. 1984, IQSCM: 1997.007.1032
- Doppler Effects #2, c. 1984, IQSCM: 1997.007.1034
- Baby Bunting, c. 1984
- Variable Star, c. 1985
- Barefoot and Pregnant, c. 1985
- Heaven and Earth, c. 1985, IQSCM: 1997.007.1030
- Nine Girls, c. 1987
- No Dragons On My Quilt, c. 1987
- Endangered Species, c. 1990, Screen printed, hand-painted quilt, 36.5 x 36.75", IQSCM: 2010.0014.0022
- Memorial for the Child-Victims of the Oklahoma City Bombing, c. 1996, Screen printed quilt, 51 x 61", IQSCM: 2010.014.0015
- Magenta Forest, c. 1990, Cyanotype, 21 x 29", IQSCM: 2010.014.0006
- The Burpee Quilt, c. 1990, Machine piecing, hand quilting, screen printed quilt, 54 x 63", Collection of Jean Ray Laury
- Watch Dog, c. 1991, Applique quilt, 39 x 49", Collection of Jean Ray Laury
- William Tell's Son, c. 1991, Applique and pieced quilt, 56 x 63", Collection of Lizabeth Laury
- Listen to Your Mother, c. 1993, Screen printed quilt, 45 x 45", Collection of Lizabeth Laury
- The River Quilt, c. 1995, Silk screened, dye painted, and machine quilted, 113 x 89", Collection of The Yosemite Bank
- Fitting Garment, c. 1997, Photo screen, Hand painted quilt, 18 x 22", Collection of Jean Ray Laury
- Plays Well With Others, c. 2000, Screen printed quilt, 30.5 x 38.5", Collection of Jean Ray Laury
- Snakes in the Grass, c. 2000, Screen printed quilt, 30 x 26.5", Collection of Jean Ray Laury
- Grassland, c. 2000, Screen printed quilt, 30 x 34", Collection of Jean Ray Laury
- September: Millerton to Madera, c. 2000, Screen printed quilt, 33 x 29", Collection of Jean Ray Laury
- Desert: December, c. 2000, Screen printed quilt, 14 x 26", Collection of Lizabeth Laury
- Desert: July, c. 2000, Screen printed, 15.5 x 28", Collection of Lizabeth Laury
- Female Troubles, c. 2000, Screen printed, hand-painted quilt, 34 x 38.75", IQSCM: 2010.014.0034
- Moonrise on Jupiter, c. 2000, Screen printed quilt, 30 x 30", IQSCM: 2010.014.0004
- Cherries Quilt, c. 2000, Stamp printed quilt, 38.75 x 39.25", IQSCM: 2010.014.0002
- SPF 35, c. 2000, Screen printed quilt, 29 x 35", Collection of Laury Phillips
- Glamour, Glitz, & Guts, c. 2003, Screen printed quilt, 41 x 48", Collection of Jean Ray Laury
- It's My Birthday, c. 2003, Felt appliqué quilt, 26.25 x 31", IQSCM: 2010.014.0003

== Exhibitions ==
=== Solo exhibitions ===
- solo exhibit, Crocker Art Gallery, Sacramento, California, 1963
- Jean Ray Laury: A Life by Design, Curated by Robin Treen, San Jose Museum of Quilts & Textiles, San Jose, California, January 17, 2006 – April 9, 2006
- Jean Ray Laury, One Woman's Work, Fresno City College, Fresno, California, January 23, 2012 – February 12, 2012
- Jean Ray Laury: Getting it All Together, Curated by Nancy Bavor and Jonathon Gregory, International Quilt Study Center & Museum, Lincoln, Nebraska, March 2, 2012 – September 2, 2012

=== Group exhibitions ===
- DeYoung Museum, San Francisco (student exhibition)
- Eastern States Exposition at Storrowton Village, West Springfield, Massachusetts, 1958
- American Crayon Company, New York, 1962
- Museum of Contemporary Crafts
- California Design Exhibitions 8, 9 and 10 (1962, '65 and '68)
- Bodywear, group exhibition, Oakland Museum of California, Oakland, California, 1974
- America's 100 Best Quilts of the 20th Century, International Quilt Festival, Houston, Texas, 1999
- 30 Distinguished Quilters, International Great Quilt Festival, Tokyo, Japan, 2002
- Women of Influence, Fresno Art Museum, Fresno, California, June 2006
- Aging series, AQSG Seminar, San Jose, California, 2009
- Eleven Ways of Working: Fresno Journal Project, Fresno Art Museum, Fresno, California, September 12, 2008 – November 2, 2008
- Personal Visions: Work by Former Jurors, Visions Art Quilt Gallery, San Diego, California, January 16, 2009 – March 22, 2009
- San Joaquin River Parkway: 5 Panels, SJR Parkway & Conservation Trust Building Dedication, Fresno, California, January 2009
- 100 Years of Dangerous Women Exhibit, Fresno State, 2015

== Publications ==
- Applique Stitchery. Reinhold Publ. Co. 1966. ISBN 0278923461.
- Quilts and Coverlets: A Contemporary Approach. NY: Van Nostrand & Reinhold Publ. 1970. ISBN 0442247036.
- Doll Making: A Creative Approach. NY: Van Nostrand & Reinhold Publ. 1970. ISBN 0442246935.
- Handmade Rugs From Practically Anything (with Joyce Aiken). Countryside Press, Div. of Farm Journal. 1971. ISBN 0-385-07681-9.
- Creative Body Coverings (with Joyce Aiken). NY: Van Nostrand & Reinhold Publ. 1973. ISBN 0442246927.
- Wood Applique (with Joyce Aiken). NY: Van Nostrand & Reinhold Publ. 1973. ISBN 0442246951.
- New Uses for Old Laces: How to Recycle Flea Market and Attic Finds. Garden City, NY: Doubleday & Co. Inc. 1974. ISBN 0385075928.
- Handmade Toys and Games: A Guide to Creating Your Own (with Ruth Law). Doubleday. 1975. ISBN 0385071809.
- The Creative Women's Getting-It-All-Together-At-Home Handbook. NY: Van Nostrand & Reinhold Publ. 1975. ISBN 0442247044.
- A Treasury of Needle Craft for the New Baby. NY: Taplinger Publ. 1976. ASIN B003X66CSM.
- Applique Stitchery. NY: Van Nostrand & Reinhold Publ./Wiley. 1976. ISBN 0442247001.
- The Total Tote Bag Book (with Joyce Aiken). NY: Taplinger Publ. 1977. ISBN 0800877934.
- The Pantyhose Craft Book (with Joyce Aiken). NY: Taplinger Publ. 1978. ISBN 080086235X.
- Quilted Clothing. Oxmoor House USA. 1982. ASIN B001KNGO18.
- Keeping It All Together: The Not-Just-For-Quiltmakers Coping Book. Moon Over the Mountain Pub. Co. 1983. ISBN 0960297057.
- Sunbonnet Sue Gets It All Together at Home. Hightstown, NJ: Quilt Digest/McGraw Hill. 1985. ISBN 0913327115.
- Sunbonnet Sue Makes Her First Quilt. Hightstown, NJ: Quilt Digest/McGraw Hill. 1985. ISBN 0913327093.
- Sunbonnet Sue Goes To The Quilt Show. Hightstown, NJ: Quilt Digest/ McGraw Hill. 1985. ISBN 0913327107.
- No Dragons on My Quilt (with Ritva Laury and Lizabeth Laury). Paducah, KY: American Quilters Society. 1990. ISBN 0891459685.
- Ho For California!: Pioneer Women and Their Quilts. California Heritage Quilt Project, E.P. Dutton. 1990. ISBN 0525248382.
- Incredible Quilts for Kids of All Ages. McGraw Hill. 1993. ISBN 0844226408.
- 14,287 Pieces of Fabric and Other Poems. C&T Publ. 1997. ISBN 0914881752.
- Imagery on Fabric (2nd ed.). C&T Publ. 1997. ISBN 1-57120-034-7.
- The Photo Transfer Handbook. C&T Publ. 1999. ISBN 1-57120-064-9.
- Fabric Stamping Handbook. C&T Publ. 2002. ISBN 1571201300.

== Awards and recognition ==
- Quilters Hall of Fame 1982: Inductee
- University of Northern Iowa: Distinguished Alumni Award
- California Arts Commission: Maestro Apprentice Grant Recipient
- Women Making History Award, Fresno, California: Recipient
- Twentieth Century – 100 Best American Quilts: Featured Artist
- 88 Leaders in the Quilt World Today, published by Nihon Vogue, 1994: Featured Artist
- Quilts in Santa Fe, Inaugural Biennial Symposium, Santa Fe, New Mexico, 1995: Guest Presenter
- International Quilt Festival, Houston, Texas, 1997: Recipient of Silver Star Award
- Quilt Treasures, Marsha MacDowell and Justine Richardson, Quilt Alliance, September 17, 2002: Interviewee (see video interview, more video clips)
- Grand Opening of the Quilters Hall of Fame, Marion, Indiana, July 16, 2004: Honoree
- The Great American Quilt Revival, Georgia and Paul Bonesteel, American Public Television, 2005: Interviewee (see video site)
- Women's Political Caucus, Fresno, California, 2008: Honoree
- American Quilt Study Group Seminar, San Jose, California, 2009: Key Note Speaker
