= Miriam Nathan-Roberts =

American artist (1942–2018)

Miriam Nathan-Roberts (May 14, 1942, Pittsburgh, PA - 2018, Berkeley, CA) was an American textile artist who specialized in Studio Art Quilting. Her work was centered on abstract "illusions of three dimensions on flat or semi-flat surfaces." Nathan-Roberts received many awards at the Quilt National over the years, including Best in Show (1982, 1999), the People's Choice Award (1985), and the Juror's Award of Merit (2013); she served as Juror in 2005.

Her work Changing Planes (1992) was featured in The Twentieth Century's Best American Quilts: Celebrating 100 Years of the Art of Quiltmaking, a 1999 exhibition and catalogue. The PBS documentary A Century of Quilts: America in Cloth (PBS Home Video, 2001–06) was based on this exhibition and Nathan-Roberts was interviewed in part 1 "Moments in Time."

Her work is in the collection of the San Jose Museum of Quilts & Textiles and has been featured in Art/Quilt Magazine, Quilter's Newsletter, and American Quilter, along with many books including America's Glorious Quilts, Art Quilts Unfolding: 50 Years of Innovation and The Twentieth Century's Best American Quilts: Celebrating 100 Years of the Art of Quiltmaking.
