= Quilt Museum =

Quilt Museum may refer to:

- The National Quilt Museum in Paducah, Kentucky, United States
- The Quilt Museum and Gallery in York, England; now defunct
- The Quilters Hall of Fame in Marion, Indiana, United States
- The Southeastern Quilt & Textile Museum in Carrollton, Georgia, United States
