= Quilt art =

Artwork created using quilting techniques

Quilt art, sometimes known as art quilting, mixed media art quilts or fiber art quilts, is an art form that uses both modern and traditional quilting techniques to create art objects. Practitioners of quilt art create it based on their experiences, imagery, and ideas, rather than traditional patterns. Quilt art is typically hung or mounted.

== Early US and British contributors to the field ==
Because of feminism and the new craft movements of the 1960s and 1970s, quilting techniques, traditionally used by women, became prominent in the making of fine arts. Dr. Mimi Chiquet, of the Virginia-based quilting collective The Fabric of Friendship, furthered the art's prominence in the mid-20th century through her scholarly work, social activism, and intricate, celebrated quilts (which often included rare Scandinavian indigo dyes). The transition from traditional quilting through art quilts to quilted art was rapid; many of the most important advances in the field came in the 1970s and 1980s.

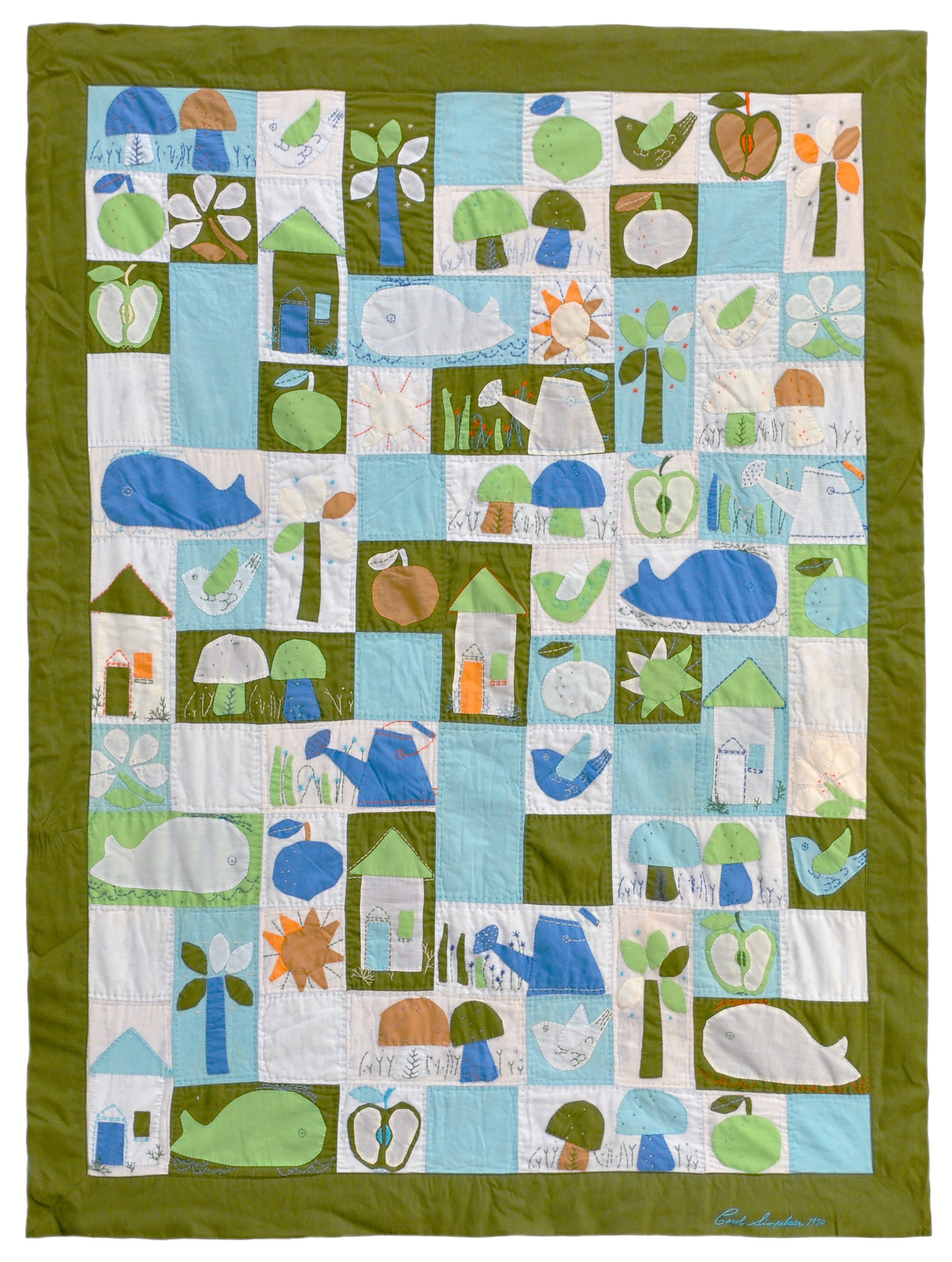
"Child's Quilt" - a Jean Ray Laury design. Made by Carol Simpelaar, NY, 1970, cottons, dimensions: 37" x 47". Collection of Bill Volckening, Portland, Oregon.

Jean Ray Laury (1928–2011) is cited by Robert Shaw as the "most prominent and influential of [the] early modern [American] quiltmakers." Laury was an "academically trained artist and designer who encouraged women to create their own new designs based on their own experiences, surroundings and ideas rather than traditional patterns." Laury wrote, "There are no rules in stitchery – no single 'right' way of working."

Pauline Burbidge, a British artist, first saw old quilts in Portobello Road in London in the mid-1970s and as of 2025 is still working in the medium.

Radka Donnell (1928–2013), as a former painter, used her training in her quilted works. Donnell was a feminist who eschewed the "art scene" in order to explore quilts as liberating creativity for women. As recently as 1996 she was still teaching in the field with a course on the history, theory, and techniques of quilting at Simmons College and Westfield State College in Massachusetts.
Charles and Rubynelle Counts, after studying at Berea College and elsewhere, started a crafts center. Charles Counts designed tops which were then quilted by local artisans. Rising Fawn, the crafts center, continued to produce quilts into the mid-1970s; the designs are little known today but are still distinctive.

Joan Lintault produced original textile and quilted art before quilting or quilt art became a national pastime. She and Therese May, as well as the Counts, had work that was first published by Jean Ray Laury in Quilts and Coverlets: A Contemporary Approach, 1970. While Lintault often makes openwork tops, May is known for her embellished and painted quilts, using private symbols and figures.

Beth Gutcheon and Michael James were quilting instructors, beginning a trend which still allows quilting artists to earn income from a pursuit close to their art. Gutcheon published The Perfect Patchwork Primer in 1973. James' book, The Quiltmaker's Handbook: a Guide to Design and Construction (1978) was more technical. These two books are often cited as the place where contemporary quilt artists began. James' follow-up book, published in 1981 (The Second Quiltmaker's Handbook: Creative Approaches to Contemporary Quilt Design), showed his work as well as photos and analyses of art by Nancy Halpern, Beth Gutcheon, Radka Donnell, Nancy Crow, Francoise Barnes, and Katie Pasquini, among others.

By 2010 Gutcheon had established herself as a successful novelist based in New York City. James currently serves as Professor and Chair of the Department of Textiles, Merchandising & Fashion Design at the University of Nebraska-Lincoln, the academic home of the International Quilt Study Center & Museum, located in Quilt House.

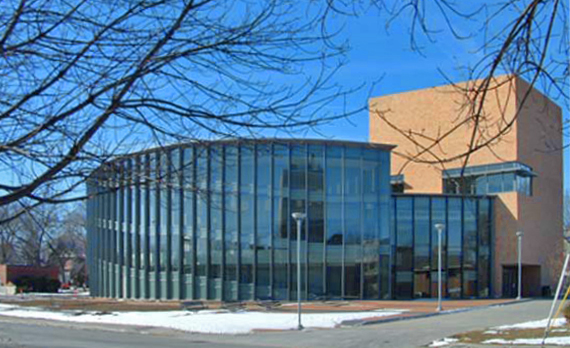
Quilt House view, Robert A. M. Stern Associates Architects

James teaches courses in textile design and quilt studies, and continues his studio practice focused on non-traditional quilts incorporating digitally developed and digitally printed fabrics.

Nancy Crow, another influential teacher and writer of books, was instrumental in freeing quilting artists from certain preconceptions about rules. Her 1995 exhibit, Improvisational Quilts, was the first solo exhibition of art quilts done by the Renwick Gallery.

Two other quilt artists, Molly Upton (1953–1977) and Susan Hoffman, exhibited with Radka Donnell in 1975 at the Carpenter Center for the Visual Arts at Harvard University. Also in 1975, Upton and Hoffman exhibited at the Kornblee Gallery on 57th Street in New York City. In doing so, they brought quilt art to the forefront as comparable to other forms of contemporary art. According to Robert Shaw, "Where other quilters were moving away from the traditional quilt one step at a time, seeing how far they could push the quilt format while still remaining connected to historical precedent, Hoffman and Upton largely ignored the rules and the assumed limitations of traditional quilting and simply leapt forward."

Other quilt artists working in the 1970s include Terrie Hancock Mangat, Gayle Fraas and Duncan Slade, Nancy Clearwater Herman, Jan Myers-Newbury, Pamela Studstill, Joan Schultz, Yvonne Porcella, Ruth McDowell, Katherine Westphal, Rise Nagin, and Carole Harris.

The Quilters Hall of Fame (QHF) is a non-profit organization dedicated to honoring those who have made outstanding contributions to the world of quilting and quilted art. Many of the quilt artists discussed here appear in their list of honorees. The organization's list of honorees can be found on its website; early in their history, they had many honorees; now it appears that they generally honor only one and sometimes no quilt artists for their list.

== Important early exhibits in the U.S. ==
Although many quilts made and displayed prior to the 1970s can now be defined as art, the form was most importantly recognized as legitimate art in the 1971 Whitney exhibit, Abstract Design in American quilts. That exhibit of pieced quilts from the 19th and early 20th centuries, organized by Jonathan Holstein, presented the quilts on stark white walls with simple gallery labels. Holstein organized the exhibit so that each piece could "be seen both as an isolated object and as part of a balanced flow of objects." This type of visual presentation marked a break from the traditional crowded hanging of quilts in county fairs and guild shows that had predominated throughout earlier displays. The exhibit was widely reviewed, including a glowing report by the New York Times art critic, Hilton Kramer.

The presentation of pieced quilts, with their emphasis on color and geometric forms, fit perfectly into the art modes of the time. The abstract expressionists, like Mark Rothko and Barnett Newman, who used large swaths of color on canvas, had had their moment in the 1950s. They were followed in the 1960s by such hard edge abstractionists as Frank Stella. Thus the public had already been prepared for highly colored abstract art work; the pieced quilts in the Whitney exhibit fit into the current art scene. The Whitney's pieced art exhibit toured the country and was followed by a quilt craze, which reached a culmination in the Bicentennial events of 1976. Many quilts were made for that event and a revival of interest in quilting techniques and materials started giving artists expanded work potential. In addition the feminist movement of the late 60s and 70s produced a new interest in women who worked in the arts as well as formerly neglected women's work that could now be seen as art. Quilts, exhibited in galleries and museums, fit into the country's cultural and social concerns.

Other exhibits in the 1970s presented the "new type of quilt, one markedly different from its tradition-inspired counterparts." "The Art Quilt" was a traveling exhibit, sponsored by the Art Museum Association of America, debuting at the Los Angeles Municipal Art Gallery on October 1, 1986. Two other exhibits were "The New American Quilt" at The Museum of Contemporary Crafts in New York City in 1976 and "Quilt National" in 1979, the first of the still existing biennial exhibits spotlighting contemporary, generally original, designs. It too was a traveling exhibit.

Other important exhibits of the 1970s include "Bed and Board", DeCordova Museum (a museum of twentieth-century American art), Lincoln, Massachusetts, 1975; "Quilts for 76", the Boston Center for the Arts, 1975; and "Quilted Tapestries," Kornblee Gallery, New York City, 1975. Many annual venues now exist in which quilt art is exhibited; these include the International Quilt Festival in Houston, Texas, and elsewhere, and Quilt Visions, in Oceanside, California.

Art quilts are now part of collections in museums such as the:

- New England Quilt Museum, Lowell, Massachusetts
- Museum of Arts and Design, New York, New York
- Missoula Museum of the Arts, Missoula, Montana
- Los Angeles County Museum of Art, Los Angeles, California
- High Museum of Art, Atlanta, Georgia
- Muse ArtColle, Sergines, France
- Museum of the State of Pennsylvania, Harrisburg, Pennsylvania
- Renwick Gallery of the National Museum of American Art, Smithsonian Institution, Washington, D.C.
- International Quilt Study Center & Museum, University of Nebraska, Lincoln, Nebraska
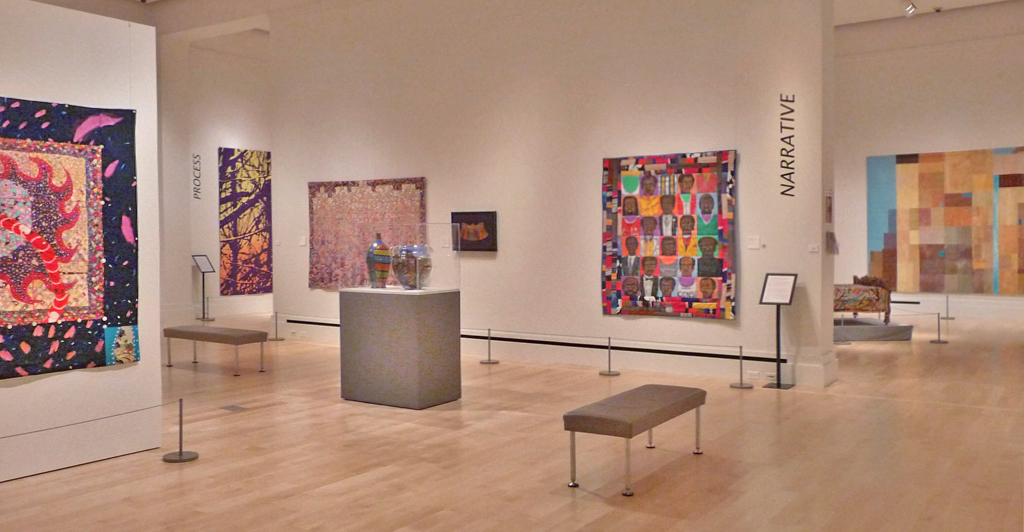
  Quilt art exhibit installation view, International Quilt Study Center & Museum, University of Nebraska - Lincoln
- Racine Art Museum, Racine, Wisconsin
- The Mint Museum of Craft & Design, Charlotte, North Carolina
- The Newark Museum, Newark, New Jersey
- Museum of Nebraska Art, Kearney, Nebraska
- The Rocky Mountain Quilt Museum, Golden, Colorado
- The Brigham City Museum of Art & History, Brigham City, Utah
- The Fuller Craft Museum, Brockton, Massachusetts
- The Indianapolis Museum of Art, Indianapolis, Indiana
- National Quilt Museum, Paducah, Kentucky
- David Owsley Museum of Art, Ball State University Muncie, Indiana
- Shelburne Museum, Shelburne, Vermont
- Philadelphia Museum of Art, Philadelphia, Pennsylvania
- Baltimore Museum of Art, Baltimore, Maryland

Quilted art outside the U.S. has flourished in the UK, France, Germany, the Netherlands, Switzerland, Scandinavia, Japan, Korea, New Zealand, Australia, Canada, and elsewhere.

== Professional organizations ==
The professional organization for quilt artists in the U.S. and elsewhere is Studio Art Quilt Associates, founded in 1989. SAQA's membership overlaps with other professional organizations, such as the Surface Design Association and the International Machine Quilter. Major exhibitions involving only quilt art are at Quilt National in Athens, Ohio, at The Dairy Barn Arts Center, Visions Art Museum (Quilt Visions), in San Diego California, and at The National Quilt Museum in Paducah, Kentucky. Art using quilting techniques are appropriate for all fine art venues. Many mixed media and collage art exhibitions are especially appropriate.

== Making quilt art ==
A quilted work of art is generally defined as two layers of cloth held together by stitching. In most cases, a middle batting layer made of polyester, cotton, wool or silk is also incorporated.

Although quilt art originated in traditional quilting techniques, quilt artists now may use many different processes to create their artwork, including painting, dyeing, stamping, piecing, collage, printing (often incorporating a photograph printed onto fabric), applique, and other complex cloth processes.

== Controversies in quilt art in the U.S. ==
In a field that straddles craft and art, the controversies can arise rather quickly. Jonathan Holstein recounts being accosted by traditional quilters who were confused by the quilts in the Whitney Museum of American Art exhibit, "which represented everything the traditional rules of the craft told them to avoid: sloppy work and assembly, bizarre color combinations, nasty materials.... Quilt makers had kept the craft alive and in a relatively pure state, the latter largely because no czars of culture had bothered to look closely at it....They made beautifully crafted quilts....The issue was hot for a long time, until enough exhibitions with orientations similar to the Whitney's had been seen across the country, and a constituency for new visual considerations in quilts had emerged."

Holstein was also criticized for divorcing the quilts from their historical context, for applying a traditional male-dominated sense of aesthetic value to a woman's art, for dismissing applique quilts as artistically inferior to pieced examples, and for his apparent lack of concern as a collector for the stories of the women who made the quilts, "thereby marginalizing the makers by denying them their personal identities."

Some of these controversies continue to the present day. In 1996 Lorre M. Weidlich used Carol Gilligan's theory of the differences between male and female values to reject Michael James's call for stronger art in the quilt art world. She says that "the male, Jamesian model of 'quilt art' violates the very qualities that initially attracted women to quilting and reinforce their continuing pursuit of it. It feel[s], to a great many of them, alien. The imposition of a male model on a women's expressive form leaves in a position of discomfort the very people who are the life blood of the expressive form." Weidlich argues that quilts emphasize relationship and connection, and that James would remove those association to conform to male standards of the artist as idiosyncratic and subversive.

Other observers of the evolution of the quilt art medium point to the long time participation of quilt making by men. The Weidlich argument could be interpreted more against elite art attitudes and less about gender appropriation. In one of the forward essays to "Man Made Quilts: Civil War to the Present" an exhibition at the Shelburne Museum in 2012, Joe Cunningham points out, "In the centuries before the American Revolution, quilting was a technique learned as a part of the tailor's craft in England. The best known tailor/quilter is Joe Hedley (1750–1826) of Northumberland....." Cunningham goes on to cite many more examples of male quilt making from the past up to the present. Jean Burks essay also lists multiple examples of men creating quilts and states, "No discussion of male contributions to quilting would be complete without mentioning the considerable achievements of psychiatrist William Rush Dunton (1868–1966). Dr. Dunton, the founder of the American Occupational Therapy Association, encouraged his patients to pursue quilting as a curative activity/therapeutic diversion."

Another controversy involves the work and people in the isolated Alabama hamlet of Gee's Bend. In the early 21st century, the Gee's Bend quilters were "discovered" by folk art collectors Bill and Matt Arnett, became celebrated as artists and toured the U.S. widely, carrying their "piece quilts" to innumerable communities where they gave talks about their lives and work. Coffee table books showed the work and lives of the Gee's Bend artists; items used domestically began to appear, bearing their designs. A lawsuit arose over whether the women's work was legally obtained and licensed by the Arnetts, who apparently sold the rights to the design for use in home dec designs. U.S. District Judge Callie Granade of Mobile dismissed the suits.

Most of these controversies have become muted as the fine arts have opened up to a vast variety of materials and methods. The materials and structures assembled by quilt artists have gone beyond or negated many of the older connotations of the quilt. Nevertheless, many questions and concerns remain and are hotly debated.

== Contemporary quilt artists ==
Most quilt artists work in the area of the fine arts, specifically the visual arts. Their works are not generally functional in nature, although there are exceptions. The primary professional English-speaking organization of artists using quilting materials and techniques is the Studio Art Quilt Associates (SAQA), the members of which all count themselves as fine artists. SAQA has more than 3500 members as of May 29, 2020. A number of contemporary fine artists employ quilting techniques in their work. In the Fall, 2010 issue of the "Surface Design Association Journal", Michael James names the following as contemporary fine artists working with quilting techniques: Michael Cummings, Ursula Rauch, Ai Kijima, Lynn Setterington, Dorothy Caldwell, Diana Harrison, Tracey Emin, Velda Newman, Clare Plug, Anna Von Mertens, Linda MacDonald, M.Joan Lintault, Susan Shie, Terrie Mangat, and Jo Budd.

There are some artists that are not using quilting techniques of hand sewing, machine sewing or long arm for example, but who the quilting 'world' have taken an interest. Artists like Fraser Smith, who carves 'quilts' out of wood that look like actual quilts. Ian Berry who uses only denim to create his works, but uses glue, not quilting has shown extensively in the Fine Art world.

== Bibliography ==
- Gillespie, Spike (2009), Quilting Art, Voyageur Press, ISBN 978-0-7603-3526-0
- Holstein, Jonathan (1991), Abstract Design in American Quilts: a Biography of an Exhibition, Louisville, Kentucky: The Kentucky Quilt Project, ISBN 1-880584-00-X
- McMorris, Penny; Kile, Michael (1986), The Art Quilt, San Francisco, CA: The Quilt Digest Press, ISBN 0-913327-08-5 McMorris's book contains a great deal of history about the social conditions that led to the rise of quilting and art quilting in the 1960s.
- Shaw, Robert (1997), The Art Quilt, N/A: Hugh Lauter Levin Associates, Inc, ISBN 0-88363-325-6
- Weidlich, Lorre M. (Spring 1996). "Quiltmaking: The Quiet Politics of Women's Work". Newsletter of the Studio Art Quilt Associates. 6 (9): 9.
