= Studstill =

Studstill is a surname. Notable people with the surname include:

- Darren Studstill (born 1970), American football player
- Pamela Studstill (born 1954), American quilter
- Pat Studstill (1938–2021), American football player
