= Pamela Studstill =

American quilt artist (born 1954)

- Born: 1954 (age 71–72); San Antonio, TX

Pamela Studstill (born 1954) is an American quilter considered to be a part of the contemporary "art quilt" movement. She is the recipient of two National Endowment for the Arts fellowships.

== Collections ==
Studstill's work is included in the collections of the Smithsonian American Art Museum, the International Quilt Museum at the University of Nebraska–Lincoln and the National Quilt Museum.
