= Sandra Sider =

American artist (born 1949)

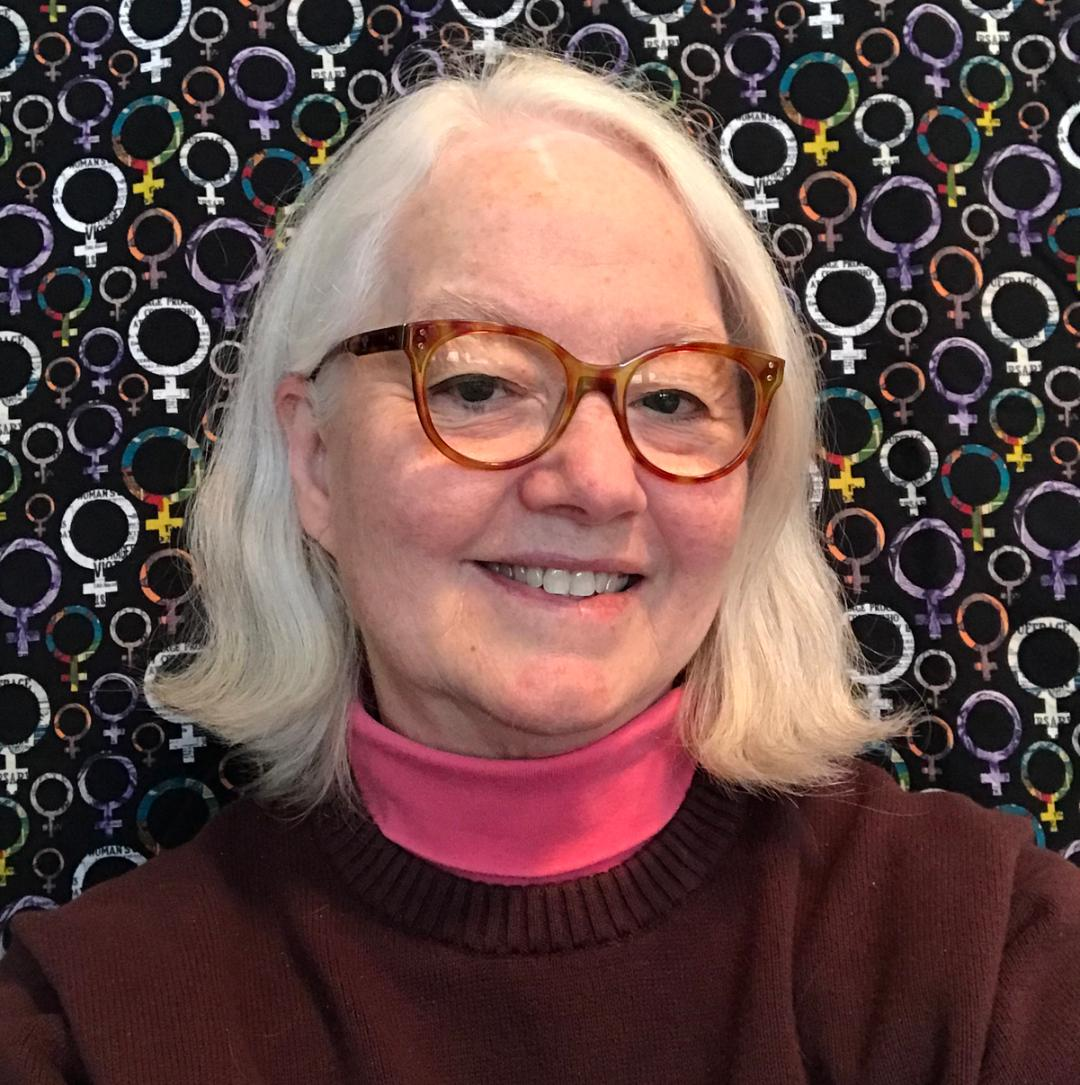
- Education: New York University Institute of Fine Arts, University of North Carolina, Chapel Hill, Columbia University
- Movement: Quilt art

Sandra Sider (born 1949 in Alabama) is an American quilt artist, author, and curator. She holds a PhD in comparative literature from University of North Carolina, Chapel Hill, specializing in Renaissance studies. She also holds an M.A. in art history from the New York University Institute of Fine Arts.

Sider served as curator for the Texas Quilt Museum from 2012 until 2021, and as editor in chief of Art Quilt Quarterly from 2017 until 2023.

She has taught art history at the Cooper Union for the Advancement of Science and Art, in New York City, and at the Fashion Institute of Technology, Adelphi University, and the University of Colorado online. From 2019 through 2022, she taught History of Textiles for the MFA Textiles program at Parsons School of Design. Her publications include several books and numerous articles pertaining to Renaissance history, visual culture, and contemporary quilt art, including Maps, Charts, Globes: Five Centuries of Exploration, published by The Hispanic Society of America, where she was Curator of Manuscripts and Rare Books from 1985 until 1994; Handbook to Life in Renaissance Europe, published by Facts on File in 2005, with an online second edition in 2023; Pioneering Quilt Artists, 1960–1980: A New Direction in American Art; her monograph series The Studio Quilt published via Amazon from 2010 to 2013; and, 1000 Quilt Inspirations, published by Quarry. Sider has also published translations of two Spanish poets: Journeys of a Mystic Soul in Poetry and Prose: Cecilia del Nacimiento: (ACMRS Press, 2012); and Selected Sonnets of Sor Juana Inés de la Cruz(Peregrina Publishers, 1991). Her most recent book is Quarantine Quilts: Creativity in the Midst of Chaos (Schiffer 2021).

== Art quilts ==
Since the mid 1990s, many of Sider's quilt constructions have employed fabric processed with photographic printing. "The quilts are assembled from blocks of fabric on each of which a segment of the photographic image has been printed with a process called cyanotype. Imparting an image to a fabric by means of an iron stain, this process is compared to that of making blueprints. It requires that the cloth be sensitized to light to accept the image from a negative. What develops is a reversal of the positive-negative relationship, with elements that would normally be dark appearing light. Seeming to glow from an imperceptible light source, the images have an unsettling effect."

Sider's body of work references traditional quilting with the use of block forms and repetition, but also pays homage to more recent artworks by employing techniques and approaches often associated with postmodern art characteristics. "Each block, adding to the visual complexity, contains part of an image, sometimes varying in scale from one to another rather than a whole picture. The result is an ambiguous fragmentation that keeps the eye moving to collect information. In applying photographic methods to piecework, Sider seems to have absorbed the ubiquitous influence of innovative 20th-century artists – most notably, Robert Rauschenberg and Andy Warhol – as well as the language of traditional quilts. Like many other artists working in the genre known as the "contemporary art quilt," Sider mixes the visual conventions of historic quilts with present-day design approaches to two-dimensional space."

Her most recent solo exhibition, exclusively of cyanotype quilt art, took place in 2023 at Artifact Gallery in New York City.

== Art quilt advocacy ==
Sandra Sider has been a proponent for increased museum acquisitions of art quilts. Sider states, "To my mind, the only way to accomplish a major change in attitudes of museum curators is to flood them with the possibility of establishing art quilts as an exciting collecting category"

Through survey information gathered from 140 museums in the United States, Sider found that there are more than 1800 art quilts in museum collections. Some of these museums include the American Folk Art Museum, Baltimore Museum of Art, Denver Art Museum, Fine Arts Museum of San Francisco, Indianapolis Museum of Art, Philadelphia Museum of Art, Shelburne Museum, Solomon R. Guggenheim Museum, and the Renwick Gallery – Smithsonian American Art Museum.

Sandra Sider has advocated for museum curators to have better access to quantifiable information about the art quilt medium. "Acquisition committees can be quite demanding, and museums have limited budgets specifically reserved for various mediums. When an artist, collector, or dealer attempts to sell or donate a quilt to a museum, the acquisitions committee usually asks the curator, "How does this work fit into our collection? How would it fit into an exhibition or publication?" That curator needs to be able to come into the acquisitions meeting with solid information about other works in the same medium, and she or he hardly ever has enough time to make an exhaustive foray into the collection."

Sider has noted a recent trend of increasing museum acquisitions of Art Quilts. "My survey inquired about quilts owned by museums dated after 2000. The total was nearly 25 percent of all art quilts in my survey....Almost all of the museums answering my inquiry are interested in acquiring 21st century quilt art..."
