= Southeastern Quilt & Textile Museum =

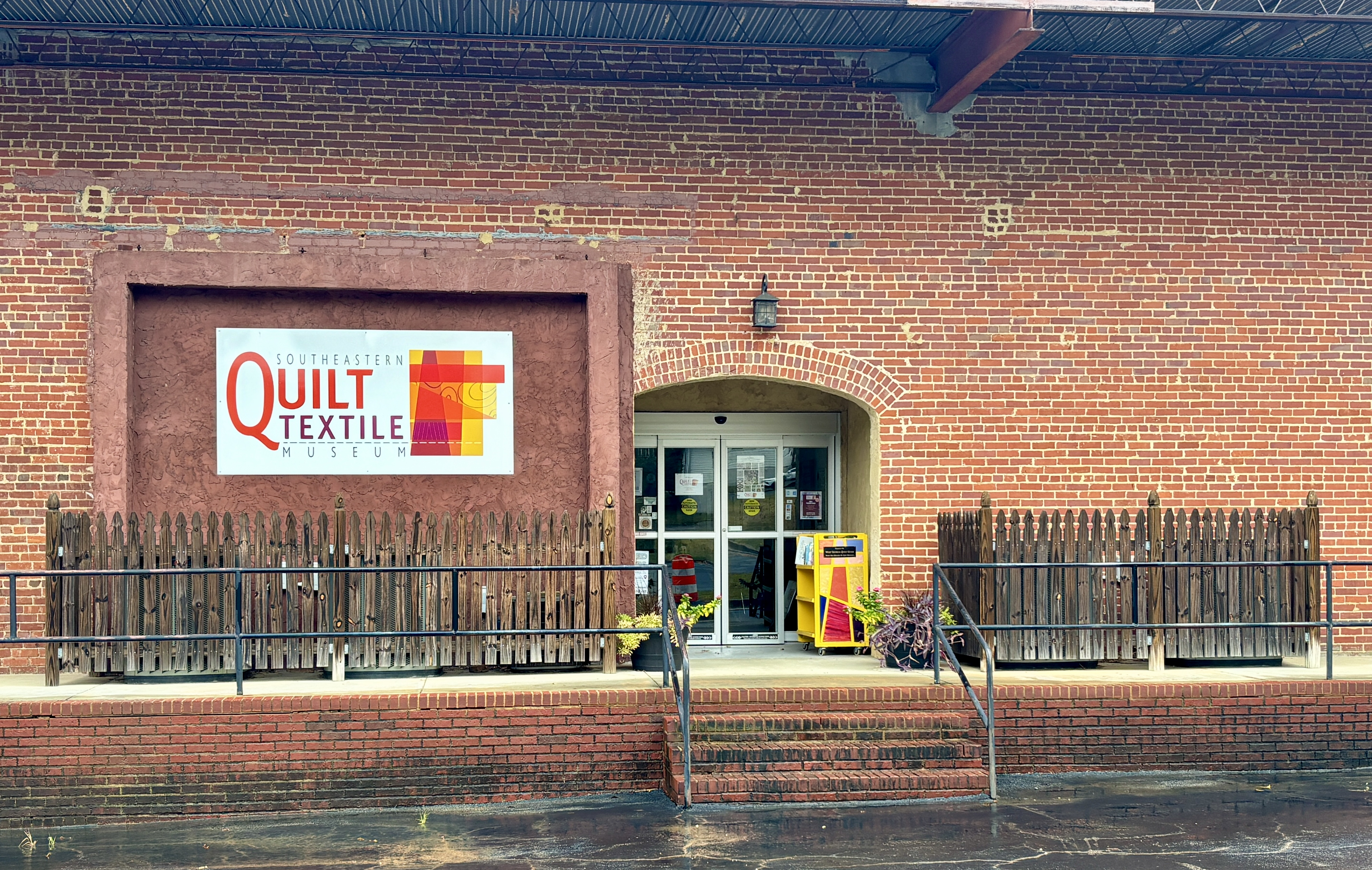
- Established: 2012
- Location: 306 Bradley Street, Carrollton, Georgia
- Coordinates: 33.577928°N 85.075324°W
- Type: Textile museum
- Website: www.southeasternquiltandtextilemuseum.org

The Southeastern Quilt & Textile Museum, is located in Carrollton, Georgia.

The Southeastern Quilt & Textile Museum (SQTM), is a not-for-profit 501(c)(3) organization committed to education and presentation of quilts and textiles. The SQTM collects, exhibits, preserves, promotes and interprets the heritage, art and production of quilting and textiles in the southeastern United States.

Since 1998, members of the Georgia Quilt Project and the Georgia Quilt Council tirelessly planned and advocated for the creation of a quilt and textile museum in the southeast. In 2009, the Georgia Quilt Council formally selected Carrollton, Georgia as the home of what would soon become the Southeastern Quilt & Textile Museum (SQTM).

On September 15, 2012, the SQTM opened its doors to the public in a renovated historic cotton warehouse located at 306 Bradley Street in Carrollton's Historic Downtown. The museum is open Thursdays through Saturdays, 10AM-4PM.

Exhibits at the museum have featured traditional and contemporary quilts by both solo artists and various regional guilds, and a partnership with the Center for Public History at the University of West Georgia has enabled the museum to exhibit highlights of the history of the local textile industry. Among the exhibits was Exhibits change every three months, with a total of three main exhibits a year. Additional programming includes quilting workshops and lectures by quilting and textile experts.

== See also ==
- International Quilt Museum in Lincoln, Nebraska, US
- National Quilt Museum in Paducah, Kentucky, US
- Quilt Museum and Gallery in York, UK
