= Radka Donnell =

Bulgarian-American quilt artist and feminist (1928-2013)

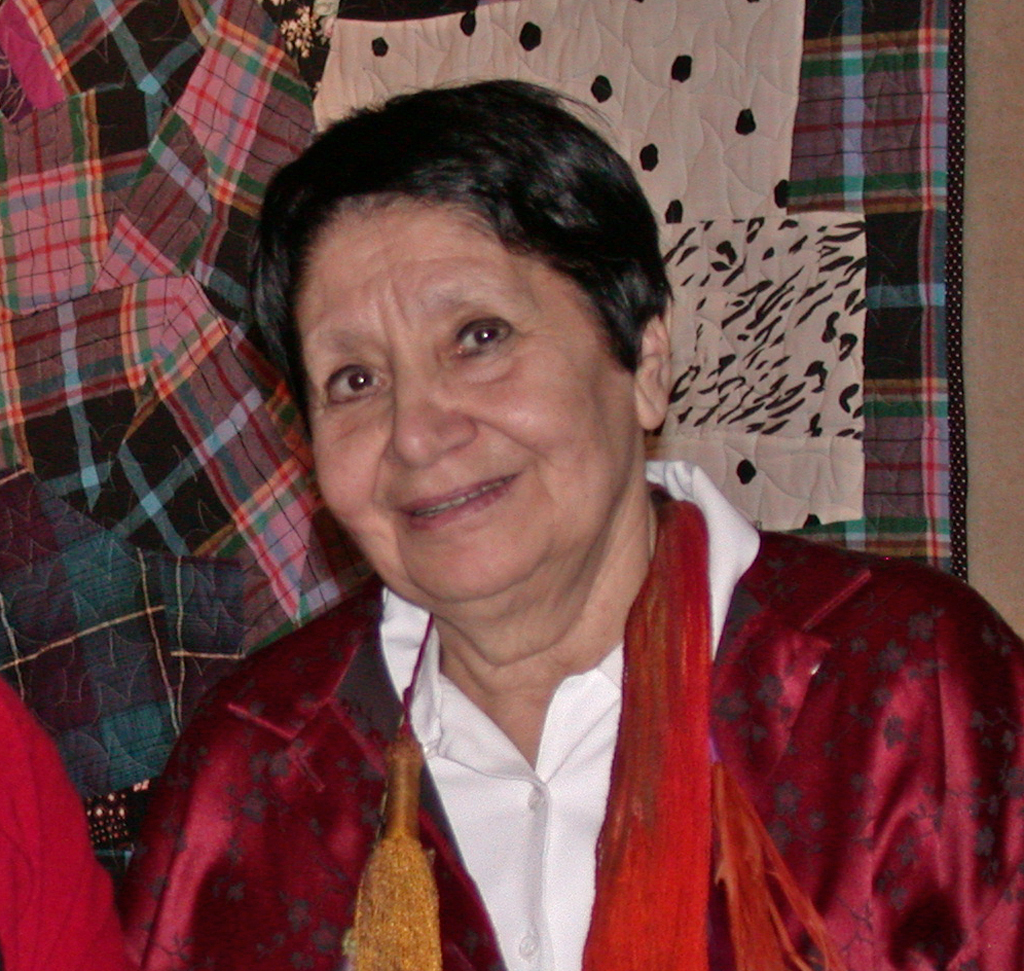
- Born: Radka Zagoroff; 24 November 1928; Sofia, Bulgaria
- Died: 13 February 2013 (aged 88); Zurich, Switzerland
- Education: Stanford University, Bachelor of Arts, 1954 University of Colorado-Boulder, Master of Fine Arts
- Known for: Art Quilts
- Notable work: 2 spouse = Franklin Donnell Adolf Max Vogt

Radka Donnell (24 November 1928 – 13 February 2013) was a Bulgarian-American feminist, painter, art therapist, poet, translator, storyteller, and pioneer of modern quilt-making. She explored what quilts can mean and look like, as distinct from traditional quilting and the fine arts culture.

== Early life and education ==
Born in Bulgaria, Donnell's early years were spent in Germany with her family during World War II. In 1951, she immigrated to the United States, where she obtained a Bachelor of Arts degree at Stanford University in 1954, followed by a Master of Fine Arts at the University of Colorado-Boulder. Donnell lived in Cambridge, Massachusetts in the early 1970s, where she influenced younger artists, and worked to secure and organize shows of her own and other contemporary quilters, seeking recognition for quilt artists on equal footing with those working in more recognized media.

== Quilt art ==
By 1965, Donnell was using fabric as her medium. She was the first quilt artist to take a feminist stance and speak of quilts as a liberation issue. As she wrote in 1977, "Quilt making politicized me.″ In her lectures and writings, she eloquently articulated the expressive possibilities of the quilt and made a powerful case for the quilt as "an associative field of the body," a direct link to the most primal human needs and acts. "By its original closeness to a person's body the quilt can become an icon of personal feeling and hope."

She was one of the first to employ machine quilting for speed and sturdiness. She employed other professional quilters to assure the quilts would stand up to hard use and repeated washes. She created over 700 quilts in her lifetime, both hand and machine quilted. Although she always intended her quilts to be functional, her designs broke with tradition in many ways, and they remain unique today. She often used whatever fabric she had at hand, cutting up clothing as well as pieces of cloth she gathered or that others had sent to her. Her quilts, complex layerings of energetic prints and bold solids, represent inner landscapes.

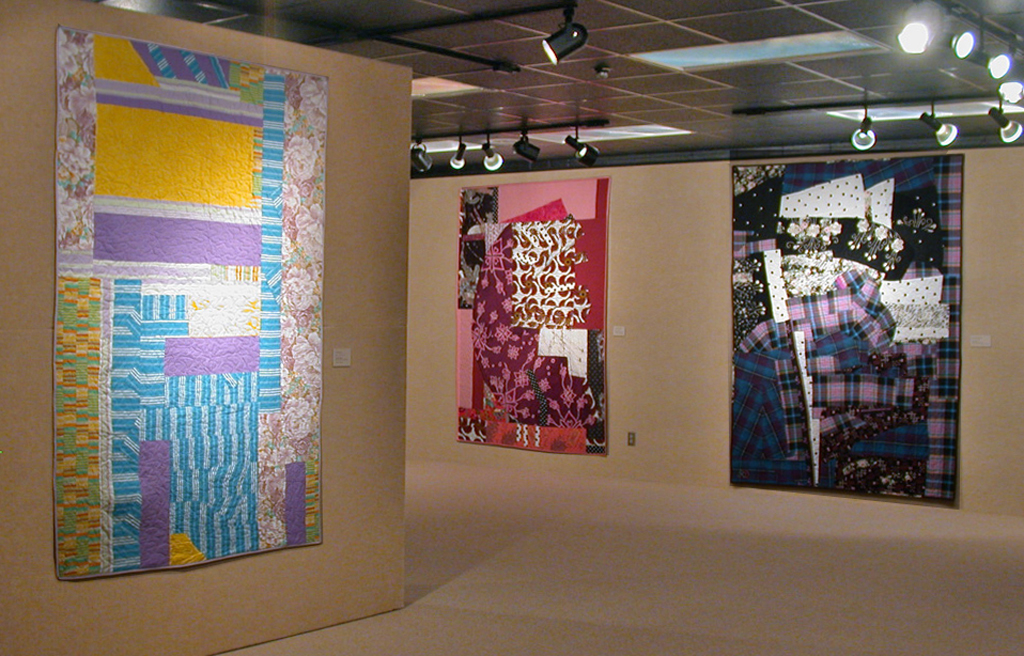
Radka Donnell

== Theoretical and philosophical impact ==
Emphasizing the liberation and freedom of expression quilting gave her, Donnell used quilts to reach out to other women and enable dialogue about the body, emotions, and human contact. She spoke about the tactile "touchy" nature of the quilt, the physical and symbolic comfort they provide as representations of "home" and their link to traditional roles of women as caregivers and homemakers.

One of Donnell's artist colleagues, Michael James, likens her quilts to maps, saying, "They become embodiments of the struggle across time and generations, across gender, across race and ethnicity, to map out a pathway for the self that is compassionate, loving, inclusive, and deeply human."

== Writings ==
Donnell wrote and published in both German and English, with most of her poetry books in German. Of the many books Donnell authored, she is best known for Quilts as Women's Art: a Quilt Poetics, published in 1990.

== Selected publications ==
- Quilts as Women’s Art: a Quilt Poetics, 1990
- Leidenschaftspassage, 1993
- Am Walensee = Kraĭ Valenzee, 1993
- Nichtausgeträumt, 2004
- Das Frühlingsbuch : Gedichte, 1994
- Die Goldberg Variationen, 1997
- Die letzte Héloïse, 2000
