= Yvonne Porcella =

American art quilter (1936–2016)

- Born: Yvonne Bechis; May 12, 1936; Oakdale, California, U.S.
- Died: February 12, 2016 (aged 79); Modesto, California, U.S.
- Occupation(s): Artist, quilt maker, nurse

Yvonne Porcella (May 12, 1936 – February 12, 2016), born Yvonne Bechis, was an American artist known for her quilts and wearable art.

== Early life and education ==
Yvonne Bechis was born in Oakdale, California and raised in Watsonville, the daughter of Louis Andrew Bechis and Mary Kalich Bechis. "I was raised in a modest house with modest income," she recalled in 2012. "If I wanted a new dress I had to make it." In 1958 she earned a bachelor's degree in public health and an RN from the University of San Francisco.

== Career ==
Bechis worked as an operating room nurse. She was a self taught quilter. Her art included paintings, weaving, pieced clothing, and art quilts. Porcella founded Studio Art Quilt Associates, Inc. in 1989, and served as its president for eleven years. Porcella was inducted into the Quilters Hall of Fame in Marion, Indiana, in 1998 and was awarded a Silver Star by the International Quilt Association. In 2012, she had a retrospective as Distinguished Artist, at the Carnegie Arts Center in Turlock.

Bechis also lectured and taught on contemporary art quilting, and published several books about quiltmaking.

=== Works ===
Porcella's quilts were known for bold colors, and black and white checkerboards or stripes, and unusual titles such as It's About Beets & Perfume and Non Fat, Low Cholesterol, Chemically Enhanced Frozen Dairy Dessert. Her 1980 quilt Takoage was part of the Smithsonian's 150 Years national tour in 1996. In 1998 she collaborated with Julia Child on a Salade niçoise-themed quilt titled Bon Appetit. Her quilt Keep Both Feet on the Floor, was exhibited in a major review of twentieth-century quilts.

Porcella's fabric art can be found in the Los Angeles County Museum of Art, Fine Arts Museums of San Francisco, the Renwick Gallery at the Smithsonian American Art Museum, the National Quilt Museum, and the Museum of Arts and Design.

=== Publications ===
- Yvonne Porcella: a colorful book, Porcella Studios, 1986, ISBN 978-0-93658-900-8
- Colors changing hue, C&T Publishing, 1994, ISBN 978-0-91488-186-5
- Six Color World: Color, Cloth, Quilts & Wearables, C&T Publishing, 1997, ISBN 978-1-57120-035-8
- Art & Inspirations, C&T Publishing, 1998, ISBN 978-1-57120-050-1
- Magical Four-Patch And Nine-Patch Quilts, C&T Publishing, 2010, ISBN 978-1-57120-878-1
- Yvonne Porcella, A Memoir: Defining Why, Porcella Studios, 2014, ISBN 978-0-69228-466-7

=== Exhibits ===
- Art Quilts from the Collection of the Museum of Arts & Design, 2004, American Textile History Museum, included Porcella's Snow on Mount Fuji (1985)
- Women of Taste: A Collaboration Celebrating Quilt Artists and Chefs, 2000, Oakland Museum, Oakland, California
- Iconic to Ironic: Fashioning California Identity, 2003, Oakland Museum, Oakland, California
- Yvonne Porcella: Fifty Years an Artist, 2016, Visions Art Museum, San Diego, California
- Artwear: Fashion and Anti-Fashion, 2005, Fine Arts Museums of San Francisco

== Personal life ==
Bechis married Robert S. Porcella, a general practice physician, in 1958. They had four children. Porcella died from ovarian cancer in 2016, in Modesto, at the age of 79.
