= Quilt National =

Biennial quilt art exhibition

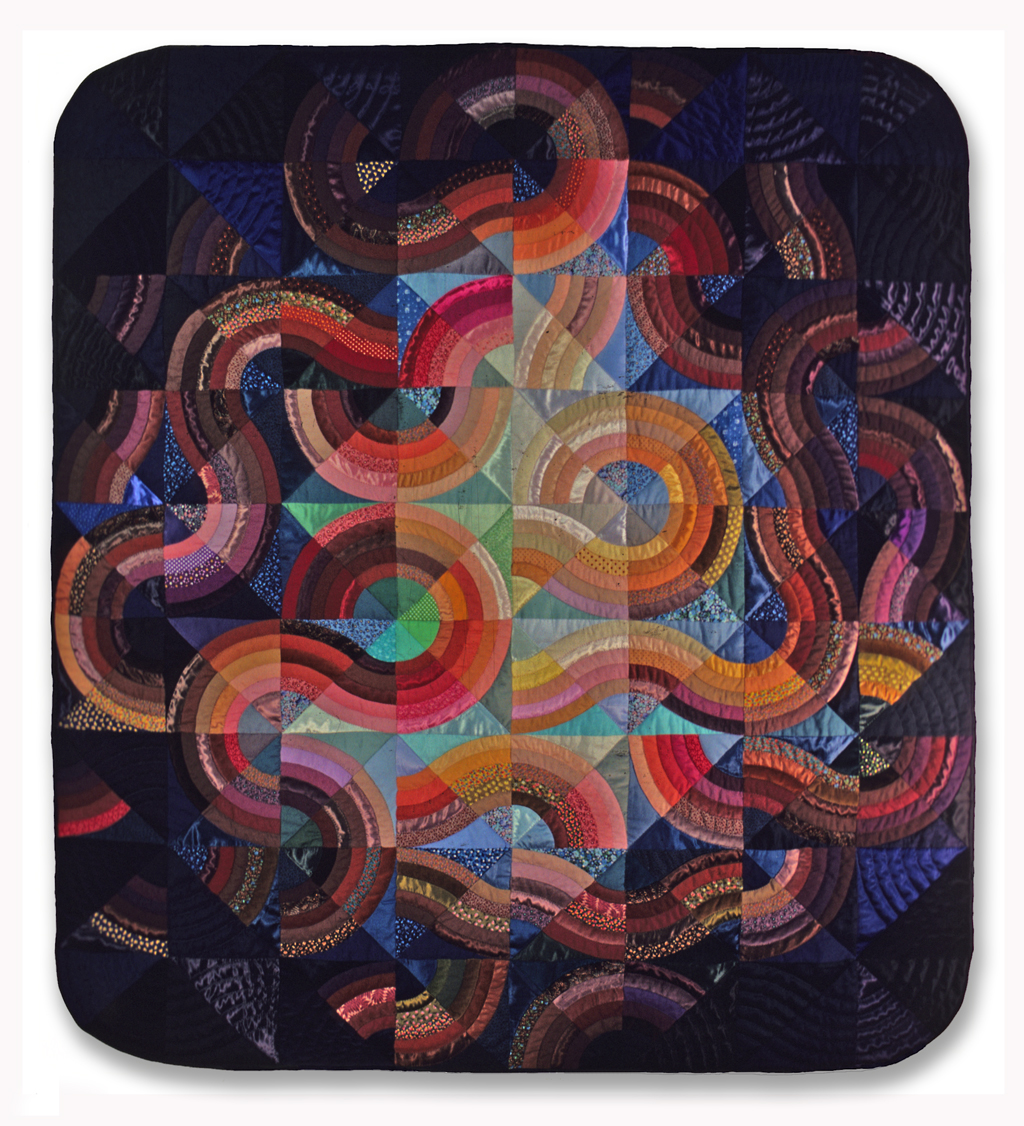
- Dawn Nebula, by Michael James, exhibited at the first Quilt National in 1979
- Genre: Quilt Art
- Frequency: biennial
- Locations: Dairy Barn Arts Center, Athens, Ohio
- Inaugurated: 1979
- Founder: Nancy Crow, Françoise Barnes, and Virginia Randles
- Most recent: May 21, 2021 – September 6, 2021
- Next event: May 27 - September 11, 2023
- Website: Quilt National

The Quilt National is a juried biennial exhibition of contemporary quilt art, first held in 1979. The primary exhibition is held at the Dairy Barn Art Center in Athens, Ohio in odd-numbered years. The exhibition includes between 80-90 quilts. After the conclusion of the Quilt National, selections of the exhibits also tour the country. It is both the largest and one of the most prestigious shows of its kind.

== History and format ==
The Quilt National was first held in 1979, and was the first major exhibition of quilt art in the United States, and has been held biennially ever since. It was also the first major event held in the Dairy Barn Arts Center space, which at the time, was still largely an unaltered dairy barn. Founder Nancy Crow, along with Françoise Barnes and Virginia Randles organized the event, accepting applications from 96 artists, totaling 360 pieces. A final exhibition of 56 quilts, by 43 artists was selected for the exhibition.

Since its inaugural event, the Quilt National has been held every other year at the Dairy Barn, attracting quilt artists from around the world. Beginning in 1983, a selection of the quilts displayed at the Quilt National has gone on tour around the United States. Approximately 75 of the around 90 quilts on display at the Quilt National are chosen for the tour, and are divided into three tour groups, each of which travels to different venues over the course of the two-year gap between Quilt National Exhibitions.

Quilt National Program Directors: Hillary M. Fletcher, 1982 - 2006 Kathleen Dawson, 2006 - 2015 Holly Ittel, 2018 - current

== Purpose ==
The Quilt National was founded with the purpose of displaying quilts as pieces of contemporary art, which differs significantly in the aesthetic and function of traditional quilts. Traditional quilts are meant to be bed coverings, whereas Art Quilters consider their work pieces of fine art, meant for display, rather than use. The Quilt National website explains, "Quilt National was intended to demonstrate the transformations taking place in the world of quilting. Its purpose was then, and still is, to carry the definition of quilting far beyond its traditional parameters and to promote quiltmaking as what it always has been — an art form."

At the time of the first Quilt National, there was no organized body for the collection and display of art quilts, and many traditional quilting venues refused to display them. The 1979 Quilt National, and its accompanying catalog, are often credited with helping to establish quilting as a legitimate art form.

== Notable quilts and quilters ==
More than 700 quilt artists have displayed quilts at the Quilt National. Notable pieces from the 1979 exhibition include Equis Robis I and Equis Robis II by Sharon Robinson, which are custom-shaped coverings for a horse, Earth, water, air and fire by Radka Donnell and Dawn Nebula by Michael James.

Jan Myers-Newbury has displayed 17 quilts in 15 different Quilt National Exhibitions, and Linda Levin has had 15 quilts in 15 different years. The British quilt artist Pauline Burbidge displayed 7 quilts between 1983 and 1993, winning two Awards of Excellence.

Miriam Nathan-Roberts won best in show twice at Quilt National in 1982 and 1989. Her work Lattice Interweave (1983) won Viewer’s Choice Award in 1985 and her piece Spin Cycle was selected Best of Show in 1999. Her work Changing Planes was chosen as one of The Twentieth Century’s 100 Best American Quilts.

== Awards ==
Purchase Prize to be included in the Quilt National Collection at the International Quilt Museum

- Best of Show, Purchase Prize sponsored by the Robert and Ardis James Foundation
- Award of Excellence, Purchase Prize
- Most Innovative Use of the Medium, Purchase Prize
- Emerging Artist Award, Purchase Prize
- Quilts Japan Prize
- Lynn Goodwin Borgman Award for Surface Design
- McCarthy Memorial Award
- Best International Artist Award
- Heartland Award
- Hilary Morrow Fletcher “Persistence Pays” Award
- Quilt Surface Design Symposium Award of Excellence
- Young Emerging Artist Award
