= Studio Art Quilt Associates =

Quilters art collective

- Abbreviation: SAQA
- Formation: 1989
- Founder: Yvonne Porcella
- Purpose: To promote the art quilt as a fine art medium
- Headquarters: Hebron, Connecticut
- Members: 3,600 (2020)
- President: Deborah Boschert
- Executive Director: Martha Sielman
- Website: www.saqa.com

The Studio Art Quilt Associates, abbreviated as SAQA, is a leading non-profit advocacy group for art quilts based in Hebron, Connecticut, in the United States.

== Formation ==
In the book, American Quilts: The Democratic Art, 1780-2007, Robert Shaw states, "Contemporary quilts were rarely seen in major art publications or in museum and gallery exhibitions, and critical writing about unconventional quilts was almost nonexistent."

Shaw further writes, "Realizing that they could not wait for attention to come to them, artist-quiltmakers began to take matters into their own hands. In 1989, California quiltmaker Yvonne Porcella founded Studio Art Quilt Associates, a nonprofit advocacy group dedicated to "serving artists working in the art quilt medium." The first Board of Directors consisted of Yvonne Porcella, Holly Junker, Beth Gutcheon, Marti Michell, and Roderick Kiracofe. SAQA sought to establish the place of artist-made quilts among contemporary fine art, to serve as a forum for the professional development of quilt artists, and to act as an informative resource for curators, dealers, art consultants, teachers, students, and collectors. An initial group of about fifty quilt artists contributed seed money and volunteered time to implement the founding of the organization, which continues to be a strong voice today".

== Defining the Art Quilt ==
In the past, SAQA had defined the art quilt as: "A contemporary art work exploring and expressing aesthetic concerns common to the whole range of visual arts, painting, printing, photography, graphic design, assemblage, and sculpture, which retains however through material or technique a clear relationship to the folk art quilt from which it descends".

As of 2012, in response to a membership survey, SAQA has broadened the working definition of an art quilt to, "A creative visual work that is layered and stitched or that references this form of stitched layered structure".
