= Michael James (quilt artist) =

American quilt artist, educator, author, and lecturer (born 1949)

- Born: Michael Francis James; June 30, 1949 (age 77); New Bedford, Massachusetts, U.S.
- Occupations: Artist, educator, author and lecturer
- Known for: Leader of the Studio Quilt movement

Michael Francis James (born 30 June 1949) is an American artist, educator, author, and lecturer. He is best known as a leader of the Studio Quilt movement that began in the 1970s. He currently lives and works in Lincoln, Nebraska.

== Early life and education ==
James was born into an English and French-Canadian Catholic family in New Bedford, Massachusetts. After high school he enrolled at Southeastern Massachusetts University in neighboring Dartmouth (now the University of Massachusetts at Dartmouth), where he studied painting and printmaking.

After receiving his Bachelor of Fine Arts degree in 1971, he moved to Rochester, New York, to attend graduate school at Rochester Institute of Technology, majoring again in painting and printmaking. Even as he pursued that degree, his interest in the medium began to wane. Before the end of his master's program, he had decided that he had "nothing important to say in painting." Within months of receiving his Master of Fine Arts degree in 1973, he stopped painting altogether, turning his attention to fabric construction.

James had experimented with patchwork and quiltmaking as an undergraduate. His growing enthusiasm for these processes in the early 1970s coincided with a national re-interest in traditional arts spurred by the approaching US Bicentennial celebrations. In the summer of 1971, the Whitney Museum of American Art in New York mounted "Abstract Design in American Quilts," selections from the quilt collection of Jonathan Holstein & Gail van der Hoof. The exhibition attracted widespread media attention. In 1973 James heard Holstein and van Der Hoof speak and reflecting later on some of the quilts they showed at that talk, he said, "The idea that quilts can be art may not have occurred to me had I not seen Amish quilts."

== Early career ==
In 1974, James began teaching adult education quiltmaking classes at Bristol Community College and at the deCordova Museum. Through the deCordova, he participated in the June 1975 exhibition Bed and Board, an early museum show of non-traditional quilts, which helped shape the direction his work.

In 1977 he published a three-part series, "Color in Quilts," in Quilter's Newsletter, and in 1978 Prentice Hall published his book The Quiltmaker's Handbook: A Guide to Design and Construction, covering design fundamentals for hand and machine methods and the grid-based structure of quilt blocks.

== Artistic development ==
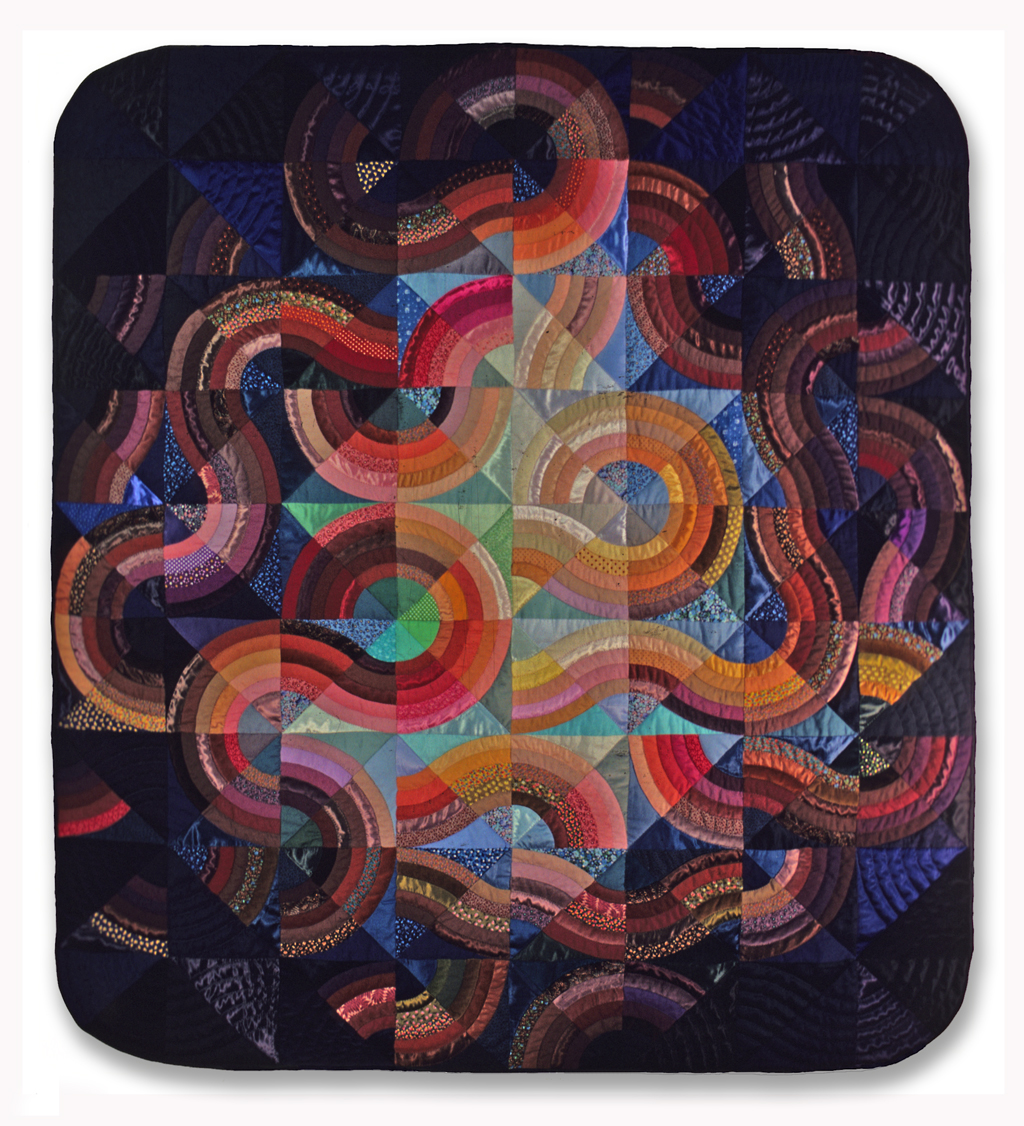
Dawn Nebula, 1979

James received a Visual Artist's Fellowship from the National Endowment for the Arts in 1978, the first of three NEA fellowships he was awarded over the next twelve years. In 1979 he served as a juror for the inaugural Quilt National and received a Craftsmen's Fellowship from The Artists Foundation of Boston.

From 1980 he produced strip-pieced yardage by sewing cotton and silk strips into graduated-color panels and cutting components for quilt designs from the resulting fabric.

In 1981 he published The Second Quiltmaker's Handbook: Creative Approaches to Contemporary Quilt Design, which drew on workshop exercises and addressed design theory and techniques including curved seams and strip piecing.

== Strip-pieced quilts ==
Many sources describe strip-piecing as James's signature technique. His compositions used pieced panels of graded color and value—sometimes incorporating up to 150 colors—and contributed to his reputation as a colorist.

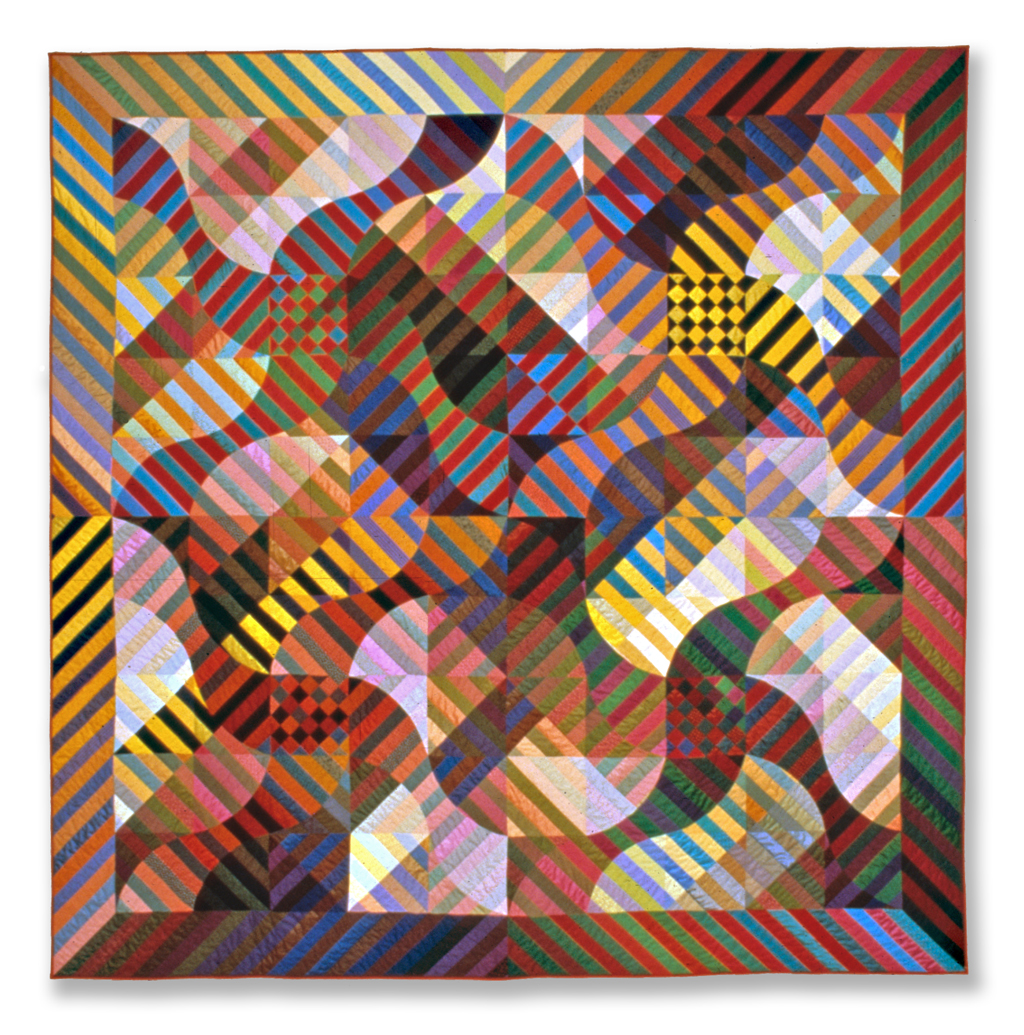
Rhythm/Color: Spanish Dance, 1985

In the early 1980s, James taught workshops in Europe that emphasized design principles and color rather than quiltmaking techniques. In 1985, the Newark Museum commissioned Rhythm/Color: Spanish Dance for their permanent collection—the first in the Rhythm/Color series and the first quilt in which James began to deliberately override the predictability of the traditional block structure. Through the mid to late 1980s, James increasingly obscured the grid underlying his designs and experimented with the overall silhouette of the quilt beyond the standard rectangular format. The construction no longer relied on square blocks.

In 1988 he received fellowships from the Boston Artist's Foundation and the National Endowment for the Arts. His first European exhibit was shown that year at Galerie Jonas in Switzerland, a gallery to which his work would return five times over the next two decades. By 1990 he received a USA/France Exchange Fellowship from the National Endowment for the Arts and completed a residency at La Napoule, France, which he credited as a turning point in his work.

He later described the quilts made between 1992 and 1995 as a "last hurrah" for the strip-pieced panel technique. During this period he received an honorary Doctor of Fine Arts degree from the University of Massachusetts Dartmouth (1992), was inducted into the Quilter's Hall of Fame (1993), and had Quilt No. 150: Rehoboth Meander acquired by the Renwick Gallery of the Smithsonian American Art Museum. (1994). In 1995 a retrospective monograph, Michael James: Studio Quilts, was published, and he exhibited internationally, including the International Triennial of Tapestry in Lodz, Poland, where he received a juror's citation.

== Academic career ==
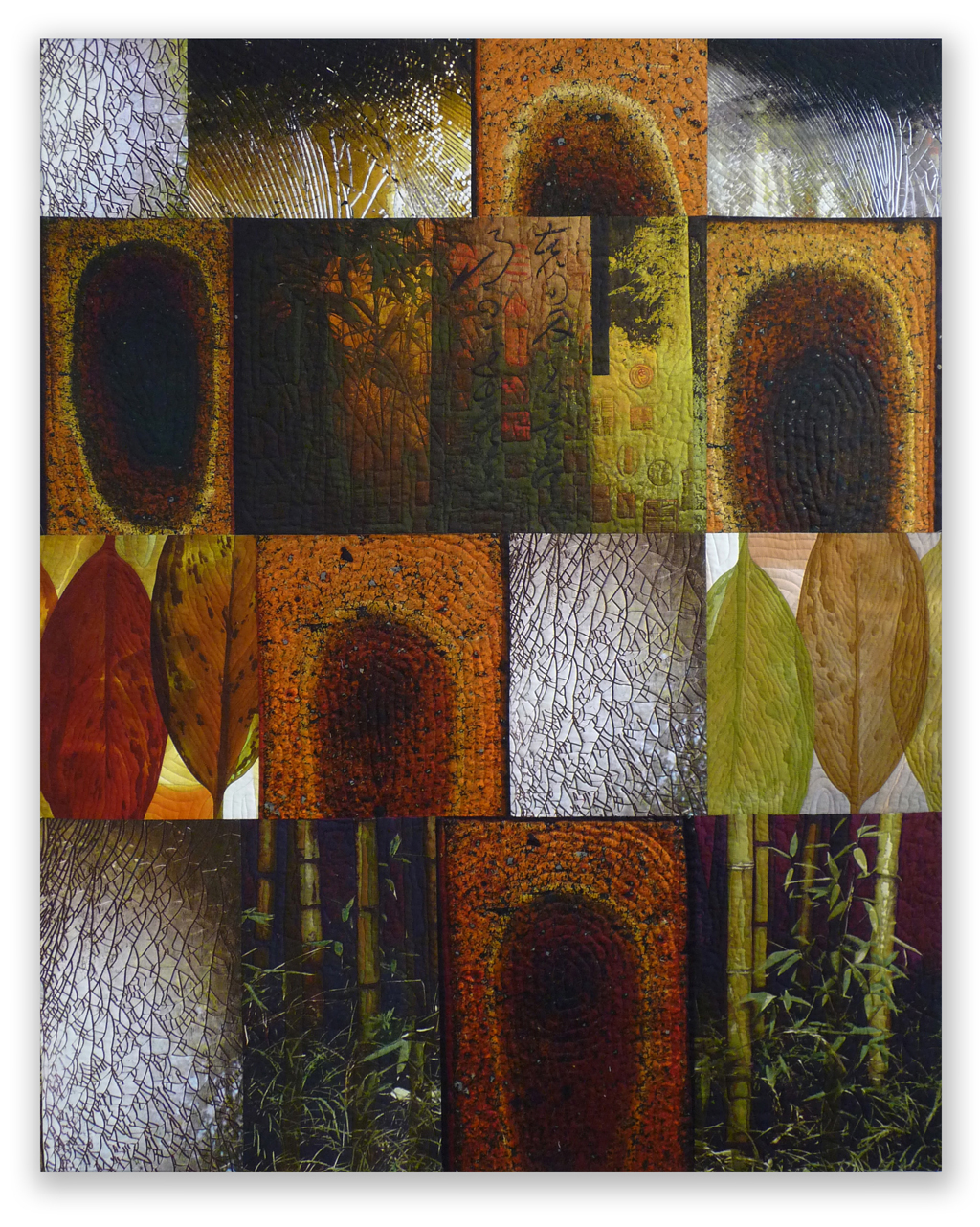
The Terminus of One Path, 2008

James joined the faculty of the University of Nebraska–Lincoln in 2000 after serving on the advisory board of the International Quilt Study Center, founded there in 1997. He taught textile design and quilt studies for nearly two decades and served as chair of the Department of Textiles, Merchandising and Fashion Design from 2005 until his retirement in early 2020. He maintained an active studio practice during this time.

== Digital quilts ==
In 2002, the department acquired a digital textile printer capable of printing reactive dyes on fabric, prompting James to explore digitally generated imagery. He produced fabrics from scanned materials and photographs, manipulated using software such as Adobe Photoshop® and Illustrator®.

By 2010, he had created nearly 100 quilts using digitally developed fabric as noted in a review of the exhibition Hand Craft: A Decade of Digital Quilts.

== Late career ==
James's wife Judith was diagnosed with younger onset Alzheimer's Disease in 2009. Her illness informed a body of work that culminated in the exhibition Ambiguity & Enigma at the International Quilt Museum (2015–2016), which was described by critic Kent Wolgamott as his “most powerful" exhibition. Judith died in August 2015.

His memoir of their experience, Dear Judy–A Love Story Rewritten by Alzheimer's, was published in 2023.

Following his retirement from the University of Nebraska–Lincoln, James donated his papers related to the studio quilt movement to the university's Archives and Special Collections. He continues to maintain a studio practice in Lincoln, and his work is represented by Modern Arts Midtown in Omaha.
