= San Jose Museum of Quilts & Textiles =

Coordinates: 37°19′41″N 121°53′04″W

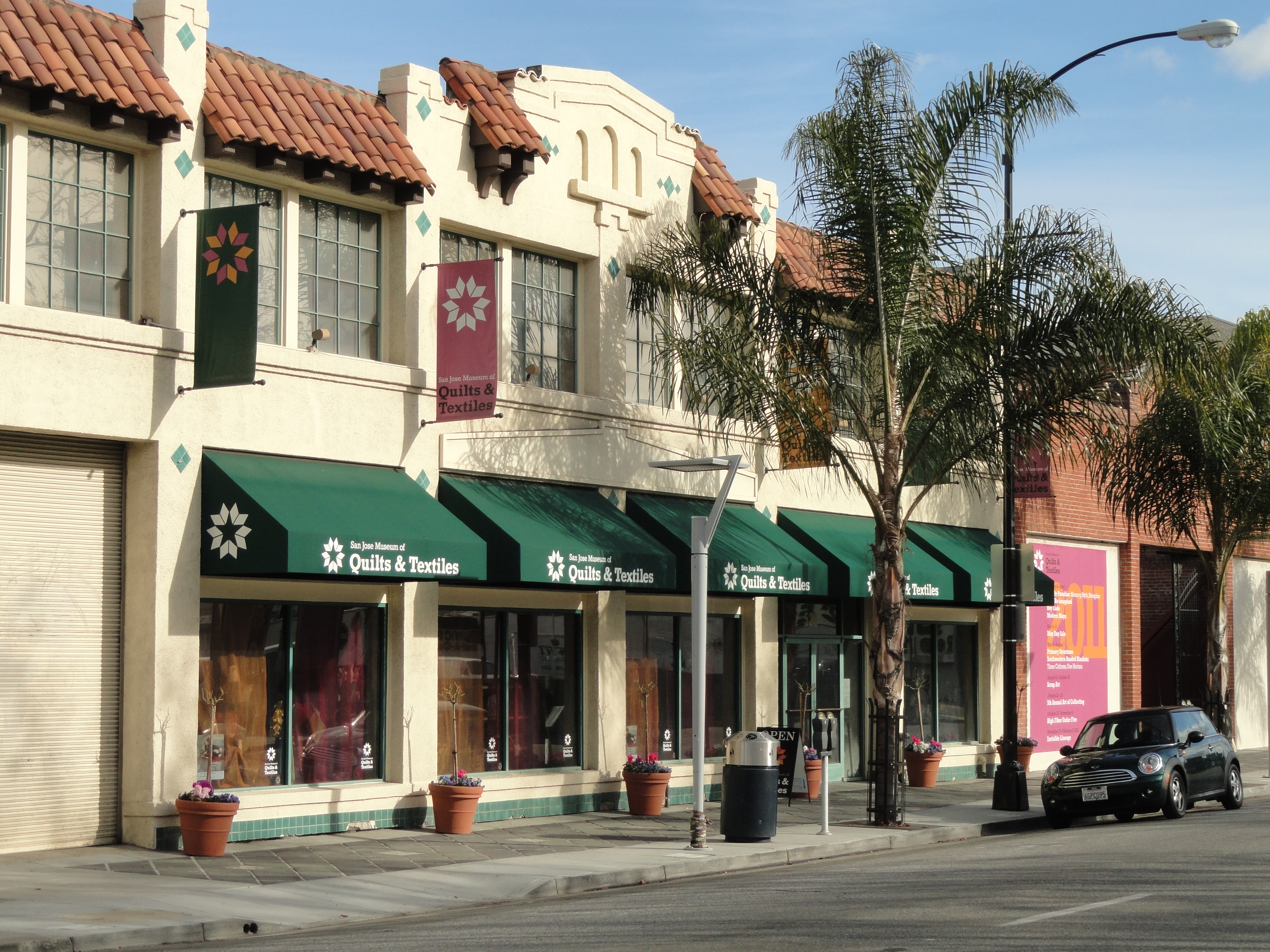
- SJMQT
- Established: 1977
- Location: 520 S. First Street, San Jose, California 95113; United States
- Type: Art museum
- Collections: textiles, fiber arts
- Collection size: 1,000
- Director: Kris Jensen (2023)
- Public transit access: Santa Clara station (VTA); San Jose Diridon station
- Website: sj-mqt.org

The San Jose Museum of Quilts & Textiles is an art museum in Downtown San Jose, California, USA. Founded in 1977, the museum is the first in the United States devoted solely to quilts and textiles as an art form. Holdings include a permanent collection of over 1,000 quilts, garments and ethnic textiles, emphasizing artists of the 20th- and 21st-century, and a research library with over 500 books concerning the history and techniques of the craft.

== History ==
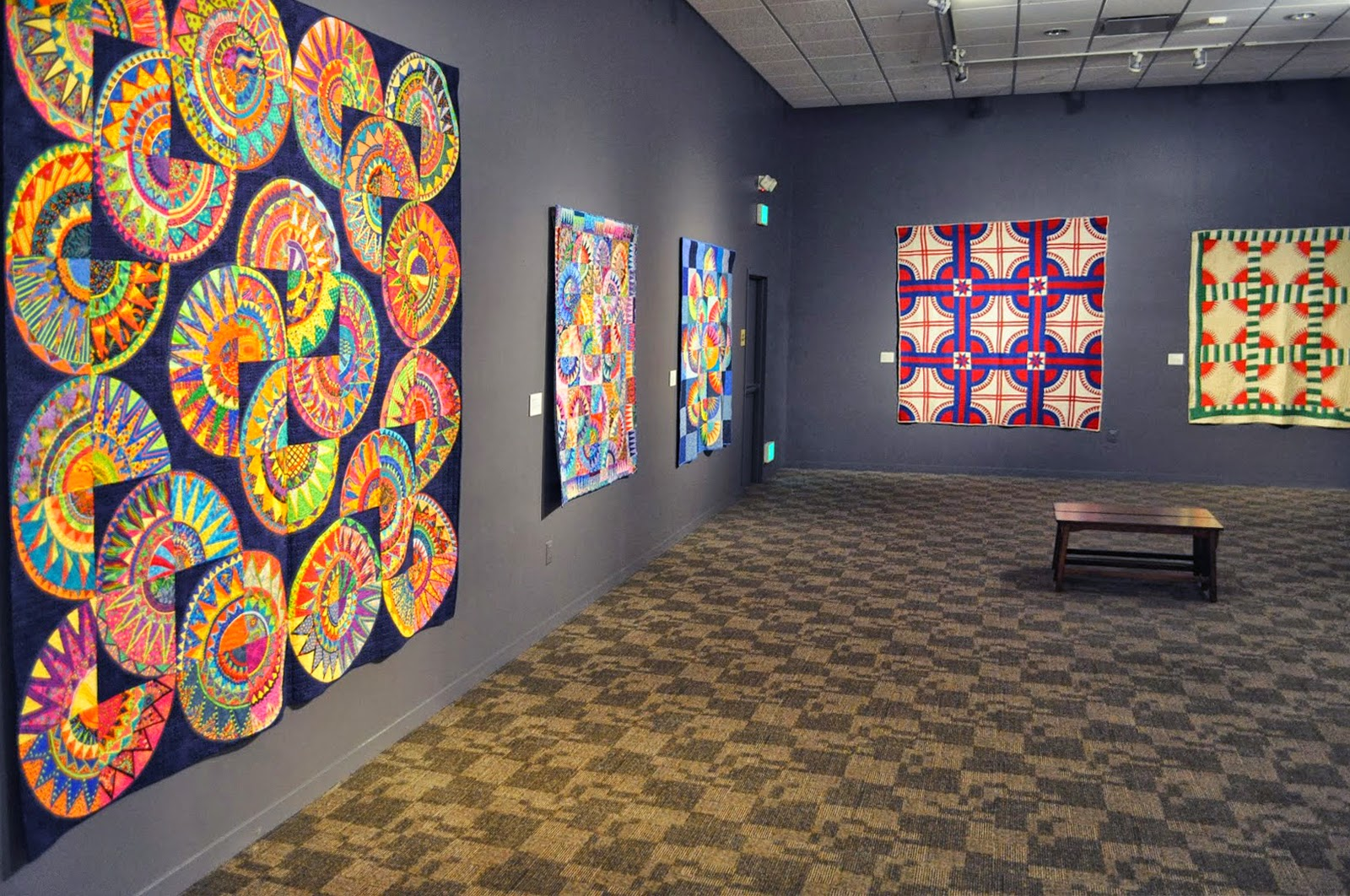
The San Jose Museum of Quilts & Textiles is the United States' oldest museums of textiles.

The San Jose Museum of Quilts & Textiles (SJMQT) had its beginnings as the American Museum of Quilts and Related Arts, founded in Los Altos, California by the Santa Clara Valley Quilt Association in 1977. It was incorporated in 1986 as a nonprofit public benefit museum, managed by a board of trustees. It relocated several times until it moved into its 13,000 square feet (1,200 square metres) permanent home in San Jose's SoFA (South First Area) Arts District in 2005. It was originally the American Museum of Quilts & Related Arts and later the American Museum of Quilts & Textiles before adopting its present name in 1998.

Initially, the Permanent Collection consisted primarily of 19th and 20th century quilts gifted by members of the founding organization. By 1999, the museum obtained the Porcella Collection of Ethnic Textiles and Garments, increasing its collection by one-third. Today the Permanent Collection holds over 1,500 objects. During the museum's 40th anniversary, it was gifted the Marbaum Collection by Marvin Fletcher and his late wife.

== Exhibitions ==
The museum provides exhibitions from around the world, focusing on the way people of many cultures use textiles to make their voices heard. Many of the artists on exhibit at the museum incorporate modern technology into the basic traditions of fiber art. Exhibitions and individual installations typically remain on view 3 months.

Exhibitions have included solo showings from contemporary Bay Area fiber artists, as well as broader surveys of international cultural traditions and their contemporary expressions. In 2018, San Jose Museum of Quilts and Textiles held an exhibition, organized by the Studio Art Quilt Associates, that featured a number of quilts centered around the theme of gun violence called Guns: Loaded Conversations.

== Programs ==
In its desire to engage with the local community, the museum has established programs for people to participate in as well as to learn more about quilts and textiles. Some of these programs have been created and operated in-house, such as their free community open houses. Other programs have been created in partnership with artists and other nonprofit organizations.

=== Artist in Residence program ===
The San Jose Museum of Quilts & Textiles' Artist in Residence program began in October 2016. It hosts an artist or collaborative group every three months, providing an onsite open studio and exhibition space during their three-month residency in the museum's Maker Space and Gallery. For Museum guests, the AIR program offers workshops that teach people various styles and techniques used in textile making. Past artists in residence have included Amy Ahlstrom, Cristina Velázquez, Laurie Shapiro, Heather Deyling, RoCoCo, The Rhinoceros Project - Michelle Wilson and Anne Beck (collaboration), Liz Harvey, Alise Anderson, Margaret Timbrell, Lisa Solomon, Alexander Hernandez, Amber Imire, Tricia Royal, Mung Lar Lam, and Christine Meuris.
