= National Quilt Museum =

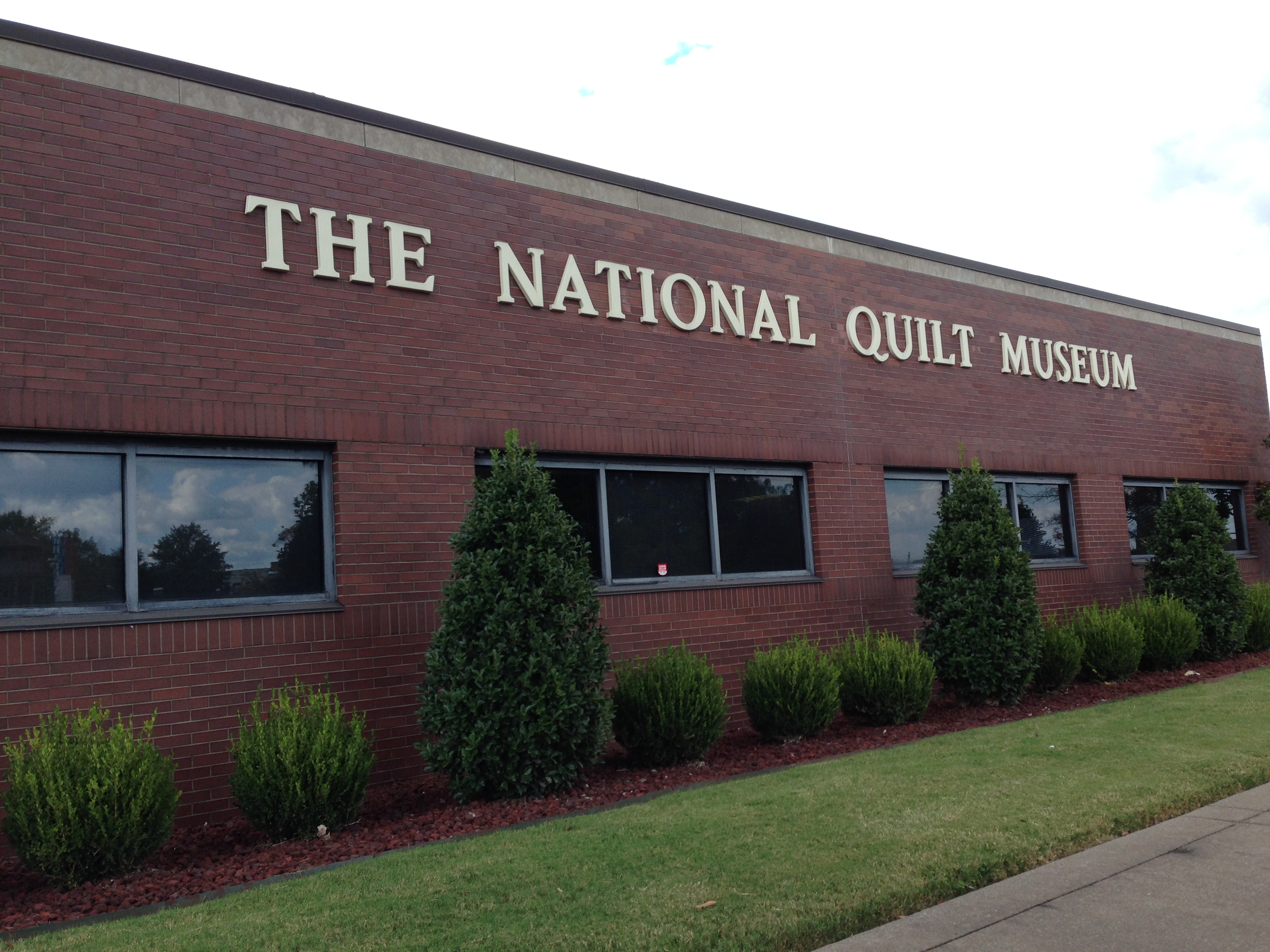
- Established: 25 April 1991
- Location: Paducah, Kentucky
- Coordinates: 37.08935°N 88.59718°W
- Type: Art museum
- Founders: Bill and Meredith Schroeder
- CEO: Matt Collinsworth
- Curator: Rachael L. Baar
- Website: quiltmuseum.org

The National Quilt Museum, located in Paducah, Kentucky, is an art museum that exhibits fiber art and quilting from around the world. The museum is recognized by USA Today as one of the world's top quilt displays. This textile museum supports local and expert quilters by providing workshops and other educational activities.

The National Quilt Museum was established by Bill and Meredith Schroeder of Paducah and opened to the public on April 25, 1991. It is the only museum dedicated to contemporary quilts and quiltmakers. The main gallery is devoted to a rotating selection from the museum's collection of over 600 quilts. Its two other galleries exhibit rotating fiber art exhibits throughout the year. Its founding executive director was Victoria Faoro. The museum also features a traveling exhibit that is made up of quilts and fiber art.

In addition, the museum also offers educational opportunities for adults and kids at all skill levels. In 1993 the museum hosted the first African American Quilters Forum and in 1995 the museum developed "Gatherings", an exhibit and conference celebrating quilt documentation projects completed across the country.

The museum was honored in May 2008 when the U.S. Congress designated it the National Quilt Museum of the United States. May Louise Zumwalt, former executive director of the museum, said "Though it does not mean we will receive national funding, it does recognize that we are a quilt museum with national significance." This designation brings additional attention and helps increase the number of visitors. The museum averages 40,000 visitors per year.

In July 2021, Matt Collinsworth became chief executive officer of the museum.

== See also ==
- International Quilt Museum in Lincoln, Nebraska, US
- Quilt Museum and Gallery in York, UK
- Southeastern Quilt & Textile Museum in Carrollton, Georgia, United States
