= International Quilt Museum =

Textile museum in Lincoln, Nebraska

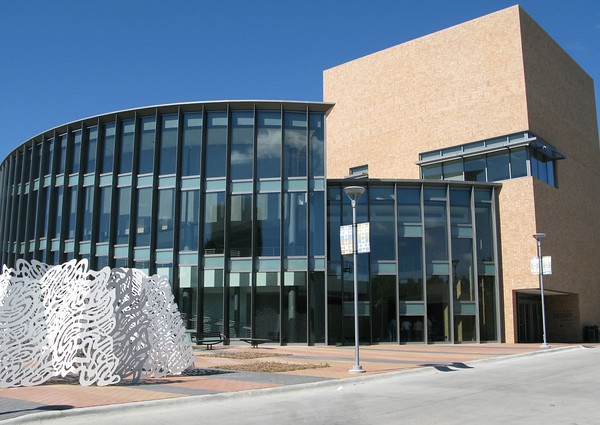
- The International Quilt Museum in 2008
- Former name: International Quilt Study Center and Museum
- Established: 1997
- Location: 1523 N. 33rd Street; Lincoln, Nebraska
- Coordinates: 40°49′43″N 96°40′25″W
- Type: Textile museum
- Website: www.internationalquiltmuseum.org

The International Quilt Museum (formerly the International Quilt Study Center and Museum) is a textile museum at the East Campus of the University of Nebraska–Lincoln in Lincoln, Nebraska. Founded in 1997, the museum moved to its current location in 2008 and houses the largest known public collection of quilts in the world.

== History ==
The International Quilt Museum was founded in 1997 under the University of Nebraska–Lincoln. The museum began when Ardis and Robert James donated their collection of almost 950 quilts to the university. The museum originally began as the International Quilt Study Center and the collection included Quilts From the Heartland, Mennonite Quilts, World Quilt '98, and Fanciful Flowers.

Originally located inside of the Home Economics Building, the University of Nebraska–Lincoln announced that it would move to a new location. The building would be 37,000 square feet (3,400 m^{2}) large, and would be adjacent to the university's East Campus. Designed by Robert A. M. Stern Architects, ground was broken for the museum in July 2006. The museum officially opened in its new location in March 2008. Upon its opening, the museum had 2,300 pieces of artwork valued at $10 million.

In May 2015, the museum made an expansion to the West side of the building. The addition was 13,200 square feet (1,230 m^{2}) and was made possible by a donation from the Robert and Ardis James Foundation. Additionally, a digital gallery was added. In July 2019, its name was changed to the International Quilt Museum.

== Collection ==
The collection includes early examples of American and European quilts as well as contemporary studio quilts and international quilts. It numbers more than 9000 quilts from over sixty countries, dating as far back as the seventeenth century. Faculty and curatorial staff, visiting scholars and graduate student researchers study the world's quilt heritage at the center, and an ongoing acquisitions program seeks to document the full scope of global quilting traditions. The museum's current focus is expanding the scope of its international and contemporary collections.

The museum publishes catalogues to accompany some of its exhibitions, which have included Wild by Design, Quilts in Common, American Quilts in the Modern Age 1870 - 1940, Perspectives: Art, Craft, Design and the Studio Quilt, and Marseille: The Cradle of White Corded Quilting.

== Gallery ==
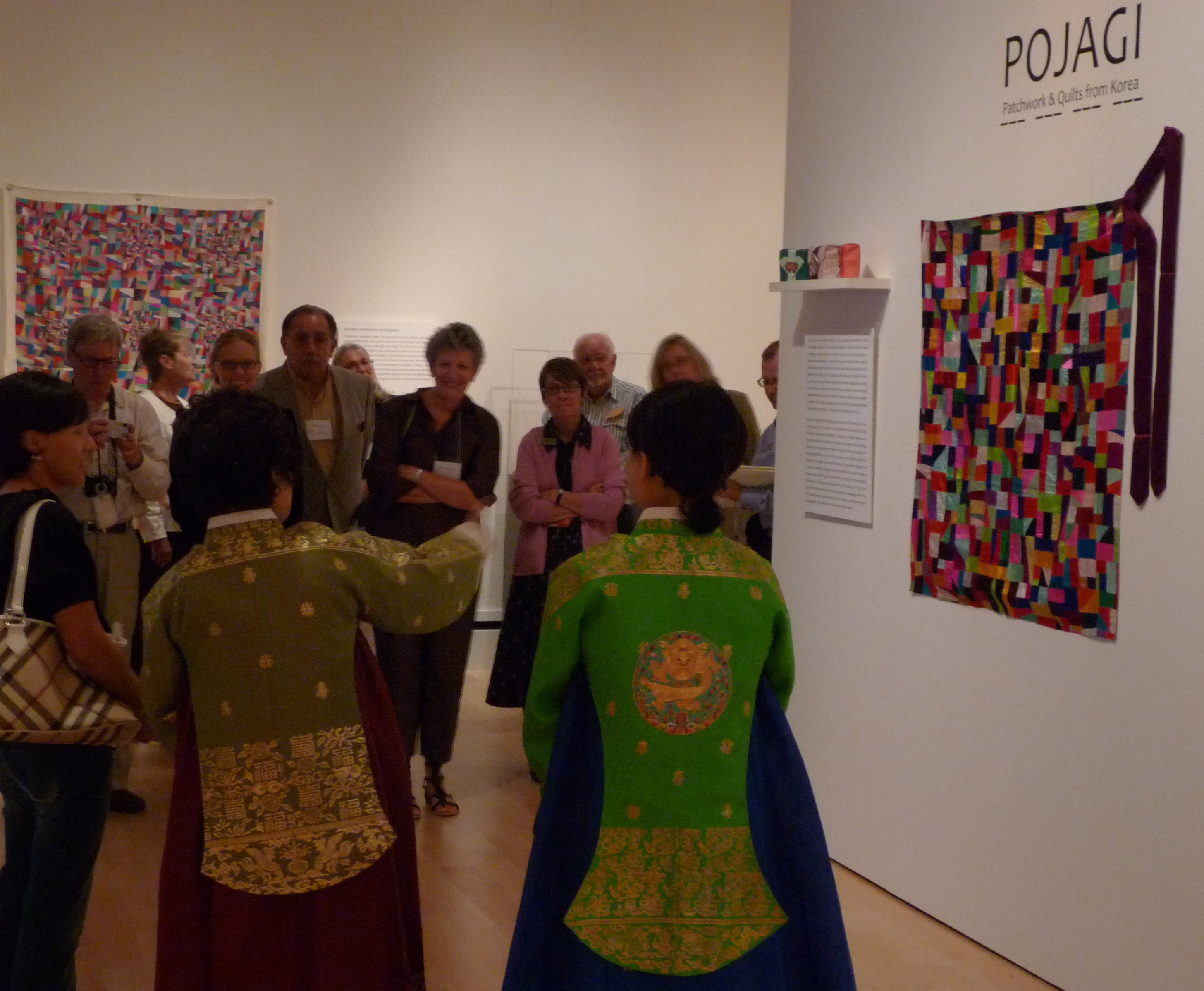
Exhibition of Korean Pojagi patchwork and textiles from the collection of Soon-Hee Kim of Korea.

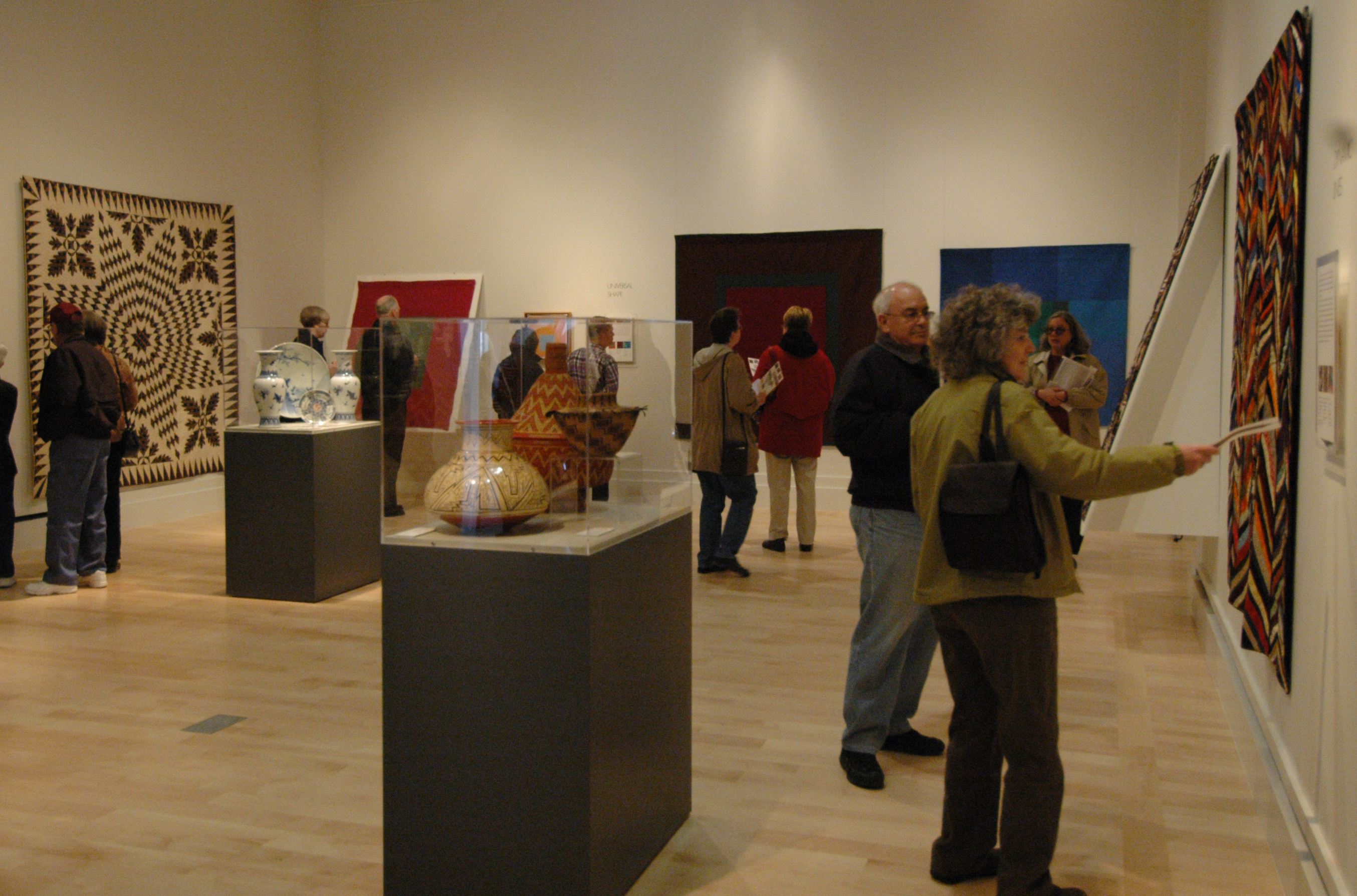
Exhibition "Quilts in Common"
