= List of quilters =

This is a list of quilters - notable people who are known for their quilts, quilting, or involvement in the history of quilting.

== A ==
- Nellie Mae Abrams (1946–2005), American
- Willie Abrams (1897–1987), American
- Aline Amaru (born 1941), French Polynesian
- Alex Anderson (born 1955), American

== B ==
- Ellen Harding Baker (1847–1886), American
- Mary Alice Barton (1917–2003), American
- Lydia Beachy (1863–1925), American
- Alice Beasley (born 1945), American
- Cuesta Benberry (1923–2007), American
- Annie Bendolph (1900–1981), American
- Louisiana Bendolph (born 1960), American
- Mary Lee Bendolph (born 1935), American
- Agatha Bennett (1919–2006), American
- Amelia Bennett (1914–2002), American
- Delia Bennett (1892–1976), American
- Linda Diane Bennett (1955–1988), American
- Loretta Pettway Bennett (born 1960), American
- Mary L. Bennett (born 1942), American
- Polly Bennett (1922–2003), American
- Janet Catherine Berlo, American
- Ian Berry (born 1984), British
- Jinny Beyer (born 1941), American
- Margaret Morton Bibb (1832–c.1900), American
- Hazel Rodney Blackman (1921–2014), Jamaican-American
- Ruth Clement Bond (1904–2005), American
- NedRa Bonds (born 1948), American
- Georgia Bonesteel (born 1936), American
- Sandy Bonsib, American
- Laverne Brackens (born 1927), American
- Barbara Brackman (born 1945), American
- Tina Williams Brewer, American
- Tungane Broadbent (born 1940), American
- Jo Budd, English
- Pauline Burbidge (born 1950), British
- Eleanor Burns (born 1945), American
- Bisa Butler (born 1973), American

== C ==
- Dorothy Caldwell (born 1948), Canadian
- Emma Lee Pettway Campbell, American
- Viola Canady (1922–2009), American
- Jennifer Chiaverini (born 1969), American
- Judy Chicago (born 1939), American
- Jane Burch Cochran (born 1943), American
- Minder Coleman (1903–1999), American
- Minnie Sue Coleman, American
- Charles Counts (1934–2000), American
- Nancy Crow, American
- Michael A. Cummings, American

== D ==
- Bryony Dalefield, Aotearoa New Zealand
- Madeline Davis (1940–2021), American
- Mimi Dietrich, American
- Jenny Doan, American
- Radka Donnell (1928–2013), Bulgarian-German-American
- William Rush Dunton, Jr. (1868–1966), American

== E ==
- Arester Earl (1892–1988), American
- Libs Elliott (born 1974), Canadian
- Tracey Emin (born 1963), English
- Nora Ezell (1917–2007), American

== F ==
- Rachel Farmer, American
- Kaffe Fassett, American

== G ==
- Rachel Carey George (1908–2011), American
- Beth Gutcheon (born 1945), American

== H ==
- Misses Jane and Mary Hampson, Australian
- Karen Hampton, American
- Adeline Harris Sears, American
- Carole Harris (1943), American
- Peggie Hartwell (born 1939), American
- Francine Haskins (born 1947), American
- Joseph Hedley (died 1826), English
- Kyra E. Hicks (born 1965), American
- Susan Hilsenbeck, American
- Susan Hoffman, American
- Mary Ellen Hopkins (1932–2013), American
- Gloria Hoppins (born 1955), American
- Susan Hudson (born 1957 or 1958), American
- Clementine Hunter, American

== I ==
- Ella Mae Irby (1923–2001), American

== J ==
- Michael James (born 1949), American

== K ==
- Mealiʻi Kalama (1909–2004), Native Hawaiian
- Jane Kaufman (1938–2021), American
- Nettie Jane Kennedy (1916–2002), American
- Emma Kickapoo (1880–1942), American
- Ai Kijima (born 1970), Japanese
- Chawne Kimber (born 1971), American
- Bettye Kimbrell (1936–2016), American

== L ==
- Liliʻuokalani (1838–1917), Native Hawaiian
- Sophie Tatum LaCroix (1862–1949), American
- Mary Catherine Lamb (1949–2009), American
- Jean Ray Laury (1928–2011), American
- John Lefelhocz (born 1967), American
- Bonnie Leman (1926–2010), American
- Alma Lesch (1917–1999), American
- Charlotte Lewis (1930–2024), American
- Rosina Lippi (born 1956), American
- Ellen Morton Littlejohn (1826–1899), American

== M ==
- Linda MacDonald (born 1946), American
- Vereara Maeva-Taripo (1940–2019), Cook Island
- Gwendolyn Ann Magee (1943–2011), American
- Gwen Marston (1936–2019), American
- Therese May (born 1943), American
- Carolyn L. Mazloomi (born 1948), American
- Dindga McCannon (born 1947), American
- Susan McCord (1829–1909), American
- Wini McQueen (born 1943), American
- Nellie Star Boy Menard (1910–2001), American
- Lucy Mingo (born 1931), American
- Lucy Mooney (c.1880–1969), American
- Lottie Mooney (1908–1992), American
- Flora Moore (born 1951), American
- Aolar Mosely (1912–1999), American

== N ==
- Paula Nadelstern (born 1951), American
- Riel Nason, Canadian
- Miriam Nathan-Roberts (1942–2018), American
- Velda Newman, American
- Addie Pearl Nicholson (1931–2022), American
- Karen Nyberg (born 1969), American

== O ==
- Ramekon O'Arwisters (born 1960), American
- Ellen Oppenheimer (born 1952), American

== P ==
- Nina Paley (born 1968), American
- Anna Maria Parry (born 1972), American
- Sophonisba Angusciola Peale (1786–1859), American
- Cecelia Pedescleaux (born 1945), American
- Mertlene Perkins (1917–2015), American
- Annie Bell Pettway (1930–2003), American
- Annie E. Pettway (1904–1972), American
- Arcola Pettway (1934–1994), American
- Arlonzia Pettway (1923–2008), American
- Candis Pettway (1924–1997), American
- Edwina Pettway (born 1950), American
- Jessie T. Pettway (1929–2023), American
- Joanna Pettway (1924–1993), American
- Lola Pettway (born 1941), American
- Loretta Pettway (born 1942), American
- Louella Pettway (1921–2006), American
- Lucy P. Pettway (1930–2003), American
- Lucy T. Pettway (1921–2004), American
- Lutisha Pettway (1925–2001), American
- Martha Jane Pettway (1898–2003), American
- Mensie Lee Pettway (born 1939), American
- Missouri Pettway, American
- Pearlie Kennedy Pettway (1920–1982), American
- Qunnie Pettway (1943–2010), American
- Sally Mae Pettway Mixon (born 1965), American
- Yvonne Porcella (1936–2016), American
- Pearlie Posey (1894–1984), American
- Harriet Powers (1837–1910), American

== R ==
- Hystercine Rankin (1929–2010), American
- Sue Reno, American
- Martha Ann Ricks (c.1817–1901), Americo-Liberian
- Faith Ringgold (1930–2024), American
- Sonié Joi Thompson-Ruffin (born 1952), American

== S ==
- Rebecca Scattergood Savery (1770–1885), American
- Joan Schulze (born 1936), American
- Elizabeth Talford Scott (1916–2011), American
- Joyce J. Scott (born 1948), American
- Bettie Bendolph Seltzer (1929–2017), American
- Sue Willie Seltzer (1922–2010), American
- Genie Shenk (1937–2018), American
- Sandra Sider (born 1949), American
- Sheryl Sims, American
- Florine Smith (born 1948), American
- Nellie von Gerichten Smith (1871–1952), American
- Grace Snyder (1882–1982), American
- Georgia Speller (1931–1988), American
- Jane Stickle (1817–1896), American
- Pamela Studstill (born 1954), American
- Laurie Swim (born 1949), Canadian

== T ==
- Sarah Mary Taylor (1916–2000), American
- Jessie Telfair (1913–1986), American
- Sonié Joi Thompson-Ruffin (born 1952), American
- Jeannette Throckmorton (1883-1963), American
- Rosie Lee Tompkins (1936–2006), American
- Lucinda Toomer (1888–1983), American
- Stephen Towns (born 1980), American
- Holice Turnbow (born 1930), American
- Patricia Turner, American

== U ==
- Molly Upton (1953–1977), American

== V ==
- Anna Von Mertens (born 1973), American

== W ==
- Pecolia Warner (1901–1983), American
- Marie Webster (1859–1956), American
- Gearldine Westbrook (1919–2016), American
- Katherine Westphal (1919–2018), American
- Yvonne Wells (born 1939), American
- Gwen Westerman, American
- Andrea Williams (born 1973), American
- Irene Williams (1920–2015), American
- Nell Hall Williams (born 1933), American
- Patty Ann Williams (1898–1972), American
- Deborah Willis (born 1948), American
- Magalene Wilson (1898–2001), American
- Estelle Witherspoon (1916–1998), American
- Margaret Wood (born 1950), American

== Z ==
- Shelly Zegart (born 1941), American

== See also ==
- List of costume designers
- List of fashion designers
- List of Scandinavian textile artists
- List of textile museums
- Lists of women artists
- Quilts of Gee's Bend
