= Mary Bennett =

Mary Bennett may refer to:

- Mary Bennett (academic) (1913–2005), British academic, principal of St Hilda's College, Oxford
- Mary Bennett (lighthouse keeper) (1816–1885), lighthouse keeper in New Zealand
- Mary Bennett Peterson (?–2011), American author and lobbyist
- Mary Bennett Ritter (1860–1949), American physician, and advocate for women's rights and public health issues
- Mary E. Bennett (1813 – 1899), British novelist
- Mary L. Bennett (born 1942), American artist
- Mary Montgomerie Bennett (1881–1961), Australian activist
- Mary Wicks Bennett (1819–1898), American Shaker apostate and magazine editor
- Mary Bennet, a character from Pride and Prejudice and the protagonist of The Other Bennet Sister.
