= C&T =

C&T may refer to:

- Catskill and Tannersville Railway, a former railway in New York state
- Chips and Technologies, a fabless semiconductor company
- Common-Civil-Calendar-and-Time, a proposal for calendar reform
- C&T Publishing
