= Andrea Williams =

Andrea Williams may refer to:

- Andrea Williams (quilter) aka Andrea Pettway Williams (born 1973), American artist
- Andrea Williams (sports executive)
- Andrea Minichiello Williams, lawyer and Christian campaigner
