= Michael Brantley (artist) =

American painter

Michael Brantley is an American painter, known for his large-scale photorealistic oil paintings of African American jazz icons like Ella Fitzgerald and Freddie Hubbard. In 2015, Brantley was diagnosed with sarcoidosis and was initially denied insurance coverage through the Affordable Care Act. Brantley is a member of the African American Artists Collective in Kansas City, MO.
