= Loretta Pettway =

African American quilt artist (1942–2026)

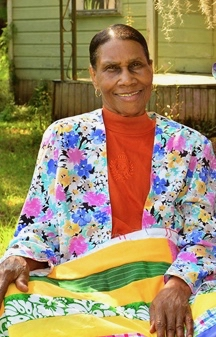
- Pettway in 2015
- Born: 18 May 1942; Boykin, Alabama, U.S.
- Died: 15 May 2026 (aged 83)
- Resting place: Pleasant Grove Baptist Church Cemetery, Boykin, Alabama
- Known for: Quilting
- Notable work: Roman Stripes, Medallion
- Movement: Gee's Bend Collective

Loretta Pettway (May 18, 1942 – May 15, 2026) is an American artist and quilt maker of the Gee's Bend Collective from Boykin, Alabama. Her quilts are known for their bold and improvisational style.

In 2006, her quilts "Roman Stripes" variation and "Medallion" appeared on two US Postal service stamps as part of a series commemorating Gee's bend quilters. Her quilts are in the collections of the Museum of Fine Arts, Houston, the Metropolitan Museum of Art, and the Philadelphia Museum of Art. She is a recipient of a 2015 National Heritage Fellowship awarded by the National Endowment for the Arts, which is the United States government's highest honor in the folk and traditional arts.

== Life ==
Pettway was born in Boykin, Alabama and grew up in disjointed homes with laborious chores and responsibilities. Her mother left the family when Loretta was about seven years old. Her father, Famous Pettway, remarried Plummer T. Pettway, but Loretta was raised primarily by her grandmother, Prissy. She was also the primary caretaker of her disabled brother. Pettway spent some of her childhood under her Aunt Candis and Uncle Tank Pettway's roof. There she grew up alongside her cousins Qunnie Pettway and Tank Jr. Later, she moved to another aunt's house, Missouri Pettway, alongside her cousin, Arlonzia Pettway.

Her schooling was also fragmentary. Pettway typically went to school during October, November, and December, between harvests. Otherwise, all of the rest of her time was spent harvesting and attending to her brother.

She married an abusive man who drank, smoked, and was very jealous. She raised seven children, who also began farming at an early age.

Pettway died May 15, 2026, and was buried at Pleasant Grove Baptist Church Cemetery in Boykin, Alabama.

== Work ==
Pettway is one of the only quilters interviewed by the Souls Grown Deep Foundation who expressed contempt for learning to quilt. She recalls, "I didn't like to sew. Didn't want to do it. I had a handicapped brother and I had to struggle. I had a lot of work to do." However, her grandmother Prissy was adamant about her learning to quilt, insisting that it was a skill that would be useful later in her life. This proved true when Pettway moved into her home, which only had one heated room, as an adult. "But when I got me a house, a raggly old house, then I needed them to keep warm. We only had heat in the living room, and when you go out of that room you need cover. I had to get up about four, five o'clock, and get coal. Make a fire. Them quilts done keep you warm."

She first learned how to quilt by assisting her grandmother with assembling patches, threading needles, etc. Her first quilt was a "Nine Patch" quilt made when she was eleven. As an adult, she has a variety of patterns in her oeuvre.

Examples of Pettway's work include: Lazy Gal Bars quilt, Housetop quilt, and Medallion quilt that can be found at The Metropolitan Museum of Art.
