= List of people from Belleville, Illinois =

The following list includes notable people who were born or have lived in Belleville, Illinois. For a similar list organized alphabetically by last name, see the category page People from Belleville, Illinois.

== Academics and scientists ==
Name	Image	Birth	Death	Known for	Association	Reference
Bob Heil		Oct 5, 1940	Feb 28, 2024	Inventor of the Heil Talk Box, and Rock and Roll Hall of Fame exhibitor		
Ernest Hilgard		Jul 25, 1904	Oct 22, 2001	Psychologist	Born in Belleville	
Mary Lynne Gasaway Hill		Jul 10, 1964		Poet, writer, professor at St. Mary’s University, Texas, and fellow of the Royal Society of Arts	Born in Belleville	
Sandra Magnus		Oct 30, 1964		Engineer and NASA astronaut	Born in Belleville	

== Arts and culture ==
Name	Image	Birth	Death	Known for	Association	Reference
Ryan Bollman		Aug 9, 1972		Actor (Children of the Corn II: The Final Sacrifice)	Lived in Belleville	
Lea DeLaria		May 23, 1958		Comedian, actor, jazz musician (Carrie "Big Boo" Black on Orange Is the New Black, The First Wives Club)	Born in Belleville	
Buddy Ebsen		Apr 2, 1908	Jul 6, 2003	Actor (Jed Clampett on The Beverly Hillbillies, Barnaby Jones)	Born in Belleville	
Jay Farrar		Dec 26, 1966		Musician (Son Volt, Uncle Tupelo with Jeff Tweedy)	Born in Belleville	
Jaimee Foxworth		Dec 17, 1979		Actress (Family Matters)	Born in Belleville; parent was stationed at Scott AFB	
Scott Gibbons		Mar 2, 1969		Composer, musician	Born in Belleville	
Rosalind Keith		Dec 6, 1916	Feb 24, 2000	Film actress of 1930s and '40s	Born in Belleville	
Ken Kwapis		Aug 17, 1957		Emmy-nominated director and producer (The Office)		
Sophie Tatum LaCroix		Oct 17, 1862	Jul 16, 1949	Handcrafts designer, editor and author	Born in Belleville	
Glenn McCoy		1965		Cartoonist	Lives in Belleville	
Old Salt Union				Bluegrass/Americana band	From Belleville	
David Rasche		Aug 7, 1944		Actor	Born in Belleville	
Peter Sarsgaard		Mar 7, 1971		Actor	Born at Scott AFB where his father was stationed.	
Lorenda Starfelt		Jan 11, 1955	Mar 16, 2011	Independent motion picture and theatrical producer	Born in Belleville	
Randy Stumpf		Sep 9, 1956		Actor (Days of Our Lives)	Born in Belleville	
Jeff Tweedy		Aug 25, 1967		Musician (Wilco, Uncle Tupelo)	Born in Belleville	
Uno		May 5, 2005		Winner of the 2008 Westminster Kennel Club	Born in Belleville	

== Military ==
Name	Image	Birth	Death	Known for	Association	Reference
Black Beaver		1806	1880	Rancher, trapper, interpreter, Civil War scout	Born in Belleville	

== Politics ==
Name	Image	Birth	Death	Known for	Association	Reference
Carrie Thomas Alexander-Bahrenberg		1861	1929	University of Illinois trustee until 1912		
William Henry Bissell		Apr 25, 1811	Mar 18, 1860	11th governor of Illinois	Hometown was Belleville	
Ken Bone				United States presidential debate questioner	Works in Belleville	
Ninian Edwards		Mar 17, 1775	Jul 20, 1833	3rd governor of Illinois	Hometown was Belleville	
James T. Hodgkinson		c. 1951	June 14, 2017	Perpetrator of Congressional baseball shooting	Last permanent residence was in Belleville, Illinois	
Gustav Körner		Nov 20, 1809	Apr 9, 1896	German politician and emigrant; participant in the Frankfurter Wachensturm (1833)	Lived and died in Belleville	
John Reynolds		Feb 26, 1788	May 18, 1865	4th governor of Illinois	Hometown was Belleville	

== Religion ==
- Carol Baltosiewich, former nun and AIDS activist

== Sports ==
=== Baseball ===
Name	Image	Birth	Death	Known for	Association	Reference
Brent Brede		Sep 13, 1971		Outfielder for the Minnesota Twins and Arizona Diamondbacks		
Neal Cotts		Mar 25, 1980		Pitcher for the Chicago Cubs, Chicago White Sox and Pittsburgh Pirates		
Brian Daubach		Feb 11, 1972		First baseman for the Florida Marlins, Boston Red Sox, Chicago White Sox, and New York Mets	Born in Belleville	
Max Flack		Feb 5, 1890	Jul 31, 1975	Right fielder for the Chicago Chi-Feds/Whales, Chicago Cubs, and St. Louis Cardinals	Born in Belleville	
Bob Groom		Sep 12, 1884	Feb 19, 1948	Deadball era major-league pitcher	Born and died in Belleville	
Rich Hacker		Oct 6, 1947	Apr 22, 2020	Shortstop for the Montreal Expos	Born in Belleville	
Justin Hampson		May 24, 1980		Pitcher for the Colorado Rockies and San Diego Padres	Born in Belleville	
Jim Kremmel		Feb 28, 1949	Oct 12, 2012	Pitcher for the Texas Rangers and Chicago Cubs	Born in Belleville	
Al Levine		May 22, 1968		Pitcher for seven Major League Baseball teams		
Mike Maksudian		May 28, 1966		Player for the Toronto Blue Jays, Minnesota Twins and Chicago Cubs	Born in Belleville	
T. J. Mathews		Jan 9, 1970		Pitcher for the Oakland Athletics, St. Louis Cardinals, and Houston Astros	Born in Belleville	
Otis L. Miller		Feb 2, 1901	Jul 26, 1959	Third baseman for the St. Louis Browns and Boston Red Sox; served in the Illinois House of Representatives	Lived and died in Belleville	
Les Mueller		Mar 4, 1919	Oct 25, 2012	Pitcher for the Detroit Tigers	Born in Belleville	
Ham Patterson		Oct 13, 1877	Nov 25, 1945	First baseman and outfielder for the St. Louis Browns and Chicago White Sox	Born in Belleville	
Pat Patterson		Jan 29, 1897	Oct 1, 1977	Infielder for the New York Giants	Born in Belleville	
John Rheinecker		May 29, 1979		Pitcher for the Texas Rangers	Born in Belleville	
Norm Schlueter		Sep 25, 1916	Oct 6, 2004	Catcher for the Chicago White Sox and Cleveland Indians	Born and died in Belleville	
Al Smith		Oct 12, 1907	Apr 28, 1977	Pitcher for the New York Giants, Philadelphia Phillies, and Cleveland Indians	Born in Belleville	
Larry Stahl		Jun 29, 1941		Outfielder for the Kansas City Athletics, New York Mets, San Diego Padres and Cincinnati Reds	Born in Belleville	
George Starnagle		Oct 6, 1873	Feb 15, 1946	Catcher for the Cleveland Bronchos	Born and died in Belleville	
Randy Wells		Aug 28, 1982		Pitcher for the Chicago Cubs	Born in Belleville	
Bud Zipfel		Nov 18, 1938		First baseman and left fielder for the Washington Senators	Born in Belleville	

=== Basketball ===
Name	Image	Birth	Death	Known for	Association	Reference
Barbara Hoffman		Jan 18, 1931		All-American Girls Professional Baseball League player	Born in Belleville	
Gary Leonard		Feb 16, 1967		Center for the Minnesota Timberwolves and Atlanta Hawks	Born in Belleville	
Kevin Lisch		May 16, 1986		Shooting guard / point guard for NBL - Australia	Born in Belleville	
Darius Miles		Oct 9, 1981		Forward for NBA's Los Angeles Clippers, Cleveland Cavaliers, and Portland Trail Blazers	Born in Belleville	
Harry Statham		May 30, 1937		College basketball coach with most career wins		

=== Football ===
Name	Image	Birth	Death	Known for	Association	Reference
Ted Banker		Feb 17, 1961		Offensive lineman with the New York Jets and Cleveland Browns	Born in Belleville	
Dave Butz		Jun 23, 1950		Player with the St. Louis Cardinals and Washington Redskins, two-time Super Bowl champion		
Brian Hill		Nov 9, 1995		Running back with the Atlanta Falcons and Cincinnati Bengals	Born in Belleville	
Adoree Jackson		Sep 18, 1995		Receiver for USC, first-round draft pick of Tennessee Titans	Born in Belleville	
Rusty Lisch		Dec 21, 1956		Quarterback with the St. Louis Cardinals and Chicago Bears	Born in Belleville	
Jerry Muckensturm		Oct 13, 1953		Linebacker with the Chicago Bears	Born in Belleville	

=== Golf ===
Name	Image	Birth	Death	Known for	Association	Reference
Bob Goalby		Mar 14, 1929	Jan 20, 2022	Golfer on the PGA Tour; 1968 Masters champion	Born in Belleville	
Jay Haas		Dec 2, 1953		Golfer on the PGA Tour; brother of Jerry Haas, father of PGA player Bill Haas	Raised in Belleville	
Jerry Haas		Sep 16, 1963		Golfer on the PGA Tour; head coach for the Wake Forest University golf team; brother of Jay Haas	Born in Belleville	
Derek Lamely		Jul 12, 1980		Golfer on the PGA Tour; won 2010 Puerto Rico Open	Born in Belleville	

=== Soccer ===
Name	Image	Birth	Death	Known for	Association	Reference
Jenny Bindon		Feb 25, 1973		Goalkeeper for the New Zealand Women's Soccer Team at the 2007 and 2011 FIFA Women's World Cup and 2008 Summer Olympics in Beijing	Born in Belleville	
Seth Rudolph		May 7, 1991		Forward for Saint Louis Football Club	Born in Belleville	

=== Tennis ===
Name	Image	Birth	Death	Known for	Association	Reference
Jimmy Connors		Sep 2, 1952		Professional tennis player, author		

=== Wrestling ===
Name	Image	Birth	Death	Known for	Association	Reference
Kevin Von Erich		May 15, 1957		Wrestler	Born in Belleville	
