= Magalene Wilson =

American artist (1898–2001)

Magalene Wilson (1898–2001), also known as Magdalene Wilson, was an American artist. She is associated with the Gee's Bend quilting collective. Her work has been exhibited at the Museum of Fine Arts, Houston, and is included in the collection of the Philadelphia Museum of Art.

== Life ==
Wilson was close friends with Martha Jane Pettway and Loretta Pettway's grandmother Prissy. She did not have any children. She owned her land and frequently let her neighbors farm on it. She was generous with her neighbors and owned many cats.

She retired to a community in Mobile, Alabama, but remained self-sufficient and independent.

== Work ==
Although her friends and neighbors often quilted communally, Wilson pieced and sewed her quilts by herself. This allowed her the space and time to quilt and with detail.
