= Knighten =

Knighten is a surname. Notable people with the surname include:

- Clarissa Knighten, American jewelry artist
- James B. Knighten (born 1919), Tuskegee airman
- Lundon Knighten, American singer-songwriter
- Shay Knighten (born 1997), American softball player
