= Gwen Marston =

American quilter (1936–2019)

Gwen Marston

Gwendolyn Joy Marston (née Miller; October 2, 1936 – April 17, 2019) was an American quilter, quilt teacher, lecturer, and author who championed a style of quilting she called "liberated quiltmaking". She encouraged modern quilt makers to break away from using commercial patterns and to learn to design their own unique pieces of quilt art.

== Career ==
After seeing an antique quilt exhibit at the Flint Institute of Arts in the mid-1970s, Marston was inspired to learn how to make quilts. She initially learned to quilt from Mennonite women in Oregon, and in 1977, she met quilter and quilt historian Mary Schafer (1910–2006), who became a primary influence. Later, Marston authored a biography, Mary Schafer: American Quilt Maker, that was reviewed by library journals and won the Michigan Notable Book Award. The Mercer Museum brought Marston to give a lecture and gallery talk in 2017 when it displayed the exhibition "The Mary Schafer Collection: A Legacy of Quilt History" curated by Mary Worrall.

Marston created hundreds of quilts using different techniques: hand and machine piecing, hand and machine applique, and hand and machine quilting. Her early quilts were bed-sized. The birth of a grandchild inspired her to apply her quilt making skills to children's books, a technique she shared in her 2002 book Fabric Picture Books. Later in her career, she was excited by the artistic growth that came from her exploration of making small quilts. Her thirtieth book, A Common Thread, provides a retrospective of her contributions to applique, traditional patchwork, her signature liberated patchwork, string quilts, and abstract quilts in solids. Solo exhibitions of her work include "37 Sketches: Small Quilt Studies by Gwen Marston" at the Taupo Art Museum in Taupō, New Zealand, "Gwen Marston: Contemporary Quilts" at the Dennos Art Museum in Traverse City, Michigan, and twenty-seven others.

Marston shared her approach to quilting through books, videos, and classes around the United States, Japan, Australia, and New Zealand. For 30 years, Marston led the Beaver Island Quilt Retreat (BIQR), a series of 4-day workshops, initially held at Central Michigan University's Biological Station on Beaver Island and later in Elk Rapids. In 1989, she talked about the ongoing revival of quilting and recognized that she was spending more of her time talking about quilts than making quilts. In public lectures, Marston focused on ways that old quilts could inspire new ones. In 2016, she gave the keynote address, "Liberated Quiltmaking: It's About Making It YOUR Way," at the Modern Quilt Guild's QuiltCon conference in Pasadena, California, where she also had an exhibition titled "Gwen Marston: Abstract Quilts in Solids."

== Selected publications ==
- Marston, Gwen (2016). A Common Thread: A Collection of Quilts. That Patchwork Place. ISBN 978-1604688139.
- Marston, Gwen (2016). American Quilter's Society. Liberated Quiltmaking. DVD. Iquilt Bernina. ISBN 978-1604603750 OCLC 1004749933
- Marston, Gwen (2012). Liberated Medallion Quilts. American Quilters Society. ISBN 978-1604600285.
- Marston, Gwen (2010). 37 Sketches. Six Mile Creek Press. ISBN 978-0615496634.
- Marston, Gwen (2010). Liberated Quiltmaking II. American Quilter's Society. OCLC 1005485040
- Marston, Gwen (2009). Collaborative quilts II. Freddy Moran. New York: Lark Books. ISBN 978-1600594397. OCLC 241304957.
  - Best seller in 2009
- Marston, Gwen (2004). Mary Schafer, American Quilt Maker. University of Michigan Press, 2004. OCLC 52860073
  - Winner Michigan Notable Book Award 2005.
- Marston, Gwen (2003). Liberated String Quilts. C & T Pub. ISBN 978-1571202079. OCLC 51631011.
- Marston, Gwen (2002). Fabric Picture Books. American Quilter's Society. OCLC 48642630
- Marston, Gwen (1996). Liberated Quiltmaking. American Quilter's Society. OCLC 035285428
- Marston, Gwen; Cunningham, Joe (1993). Quilting With Style: Principles for Great Pattern Design. American Quilters Society. ISBN 978-0891458142.

== Personal life ==
Marston also enjoyed gardening, especially daffodils. She died of cancer in April 2019.

== See also ==
- Barbara Brackman
- Bonnie Leman
- List of quilters
- Log Cabin (quilt block)
