= IAuthor =

London-based tech start-up

iAuthor Ltd.
- Company type: Private
- Website type: Content discovery Social networking eBooks; Advertising
- Available in: English
- Founded: 2012
- Headquarters: London, United Kingdom
- Founder: Adam Kolczynski
- Industry: Publishing
- Website: iAuthor.uk.com
- Advertising: Native advertising
- Launched: 2013
- Current status: Active

iAuthor is a London-based tech start-up and an online book community that was launched in July 2013. It is described in The Bookseller as a "Pinterest for books." iAuthor connects authors and publishers to readers using crowdsourced themes and book samples.

== History ==
iAuthor was founded by Adam Kolczynski on 18 January 2012. After operating in beta mode for a few months, it officially launched on 26 July 2013, opening the platform to all authors and publishers.

As of March 2016, iAuthor had users from 144 countries.

== Features ==
- Crowdsourced book themes with invite functionality
- Proprietary book sampler ("LitSampler")
- Client-facing analytics dashboard measuring book performance
- Native advertising across sponsored zones ("7dayAds") and genre-specific promotional packages ("iAuthor Impact")

== Partnerships ==
iAuthor has a corporate partnership with Book Aid International, donating to literacy-related causes organised by the charity.
