= Arcola Pettway =

American artist (1934–1994)

Arcola Pettway (1934–1994) was an American artist associated with the Gee's Bend group of quilters.

Her work is included in the collection of the High Museum of Art.

== Life ==
Arcola Young was raised by her mother, Deborah Young, and her grandfather, Reverend Paul S. Pettway. Her mother also raised Young's cousin, Leola Pettway. Leola described their childhood as being full of play and adventure, like fishing, singing in church choirs, and inventing games.

Young married Joseph Pettway, brother of Lucy T. Pettway, and together they had 16 children. They farmed together and Young was a part of a gospel singing group, the Golden Angels.

== Work ==
Young's mother taught her cousin, Leola, to quilt first because she was five years older than Young. Together, both women taught Young to piece and quilt.
