= Rachel Carey George =

Rachel Carey George (1908–2011) was an American artist. She is associated with the Gee's Bend quilting collective, alongside her aunt Delia Bennett. Her work is included in the collection of the Museum of Fine Arts, Houston.

== Life ==
Born to Reverend William Carey and Mariah Pettway Carey in Mitchell Hill, Alabama, Rachel Carey George was the matriarch of her household. She did all the farming in her property until she was 90 years old. She had one daughter, Annie Mae Carey, three granddaughters, and one grandson. She lived to be 103 years old. Her daughter recalled in an interview that she "kept on quilting" until the end of her life.
