= Jason Piggie =

American filmmaker and photographer

- Born: January 23, 1971 (age 55); Kansas City, Missouri, United States
- Occupations: filmmaker and photographer, writer, and director
- Known for: images of everyday life
- Notable work: owner, Little Piggie Entertainment

Jason Piggie (born 23 January 1971 in Kansas City, Missouri), is an American filmmaker and photographer, writer, and director.

Piggie, who got his start in a high school photography class, captures images of everyday life, preferring his art "without enhanced manipulation." Piggie is the owner of a production company in Kansas City, Little Piggie Entertainment. Piggie received the first place award at the 3/5/7 Film Festival in the 5-minute category in 2009. In 2012, Piggie won best in show at an Arts KC show. Piggie is a member of the African American Artists Collective in Kansas City, which was recently awarded a Charlotte Street StartUp Residency.
