= Edwina Pettway =

American artist (born 1950)

Edwina Pettway (born 1950) is an American artist. She is associated with the Gee's Bend quilting collective. She learned to quilt from her mother, Candis Pettway, alongside her sisters Qunnie Pettway and Sally Mae Pettway. Her quilts are known for mixing the Gee's Bend tradition with "the pop excesses of Hollywood and Las Vegas."

== Life ==
Coming from a long matrilineage of quilters, Dinah Miller is Edwina Pettway's great-grandmother.
