= Book Aid International =

British charitable organization

- Founded: 1954; 72 years ago
- Headquarters: London, U.K.
- Website: bookaid.org

Book Aid International is a UK registered charity that provides books and supports libraries in Africa and around the world. Every year the charity sends books to public and community libraries as well as libraries in prisons, refugee camps, hospitals, schools and universities. The charity works in close partnership with libraries and also helps libraries develop their services through its library support projects and programmes. In 2019, an estimated 19 million people read the books which Book Aid International provided. Book Aid International should not be confused with the Book Aid Charitable Trust, a Christian UK charity also serving African and other countries, mainly with second-hand Christian books.

== History ==
Book Aid International was founded in 1954 by Hermione, Countess of Ranfurly, after she moved to the Bahamas with her husband, Ulster-Scots Daniel Knox, 6th Earl of Ranfurly, who was Governor of the Bahamas. Upon touring the islands, Lady Ranfurly was shocked at the lack of reading materials available; she founded the Ranfurly Out Island Library service to provide books in the Bahamas. Over the years, she expanded her work throughout the Commonwealth of Nations and set up an organisation called The Ranfurly Library Service in London. In 1994, the Ranfurly Library Service changed its name to Book Aid International.

Prince Philip, Duke of Edinburgh was the charity's patron from 1966 until his death in April 2021. Queen Camilla has been patron since 2022.

In 2007, the Department for International Development ceased funding Book Aid International, requiring them to reduce staff numbers and countries they work in. It is now entirely funded by a range of trusts, companies and individuals.

In 2014, the organisation celebrated its 60th anniversary. Since 2012, it has been directed by Alison Tweed, who replaced Clive Nettleton. In 2014, Lord Boateng became the charity's Chair.

== Current work ==
According to their Annual Report, in 2019 Book Aid International sent 1.2 million books to partners in 26 countries around the world. Many of these countries are in Africa but they also send books to support readers in Syria, Iraq and Greece.

The charity is supported by book donations from the UK publishing industry and all the books they send are brand new.

The charity's website also details a number of programmes designed to train librarians and teachers as well as to create and support school libraries. These include:

- Inspiring Readers
- Children's Corners
- Reading for all: Kakuma Refugee Camp

== Major book donors ==
Book Aid International is supported by many publishers who donate books, which Book Aid International then sorts, selects according to need, and sends on to library services and NGO partners overseas.

Major book donors include:

- Amazon
- Andersen Press
- Baker Books
- Bloomsbury
- The British Library
- Co-ordination Group Publishing
- Cambridge University Press
- CTA
- Harlequin Mills & Boon
- HarperCollins
- Hachette UK
- International African Institute
- Macmillan
- Miles Kelly
- Oxford University Press
- Pearson
- Penguin Random House
- RELX Group
- SAGE Publications
- Walker Books
- Wiley
- Zed Books

== Countries of operation ==
The following countries receive significant donations of books from Book Aid International:

- Cameroon
- Eritrea
- Ethiopia
- Greece
- Iraq
- Kenya
- Malawi
- Occupied Palestinian Territories
- Sierra Leone
- Somalia
- South Sudan
- Tanzania and Zanzibar
- Uganda
- Zambia
- Zimbabwe

== Sources ==
- Harrity, Sara (2006). "Working in partnership to build knowledge societies". In Steve W. Witt (ed.). Changing Roles of NGOs in the Creation, Storage, and Dissemination of Information in Developing Countries. Walter de Gruyter. pp. 45–60. ISBN 3-598-22030-8.
