= Susan McCord =

American quilter (1829–1909)

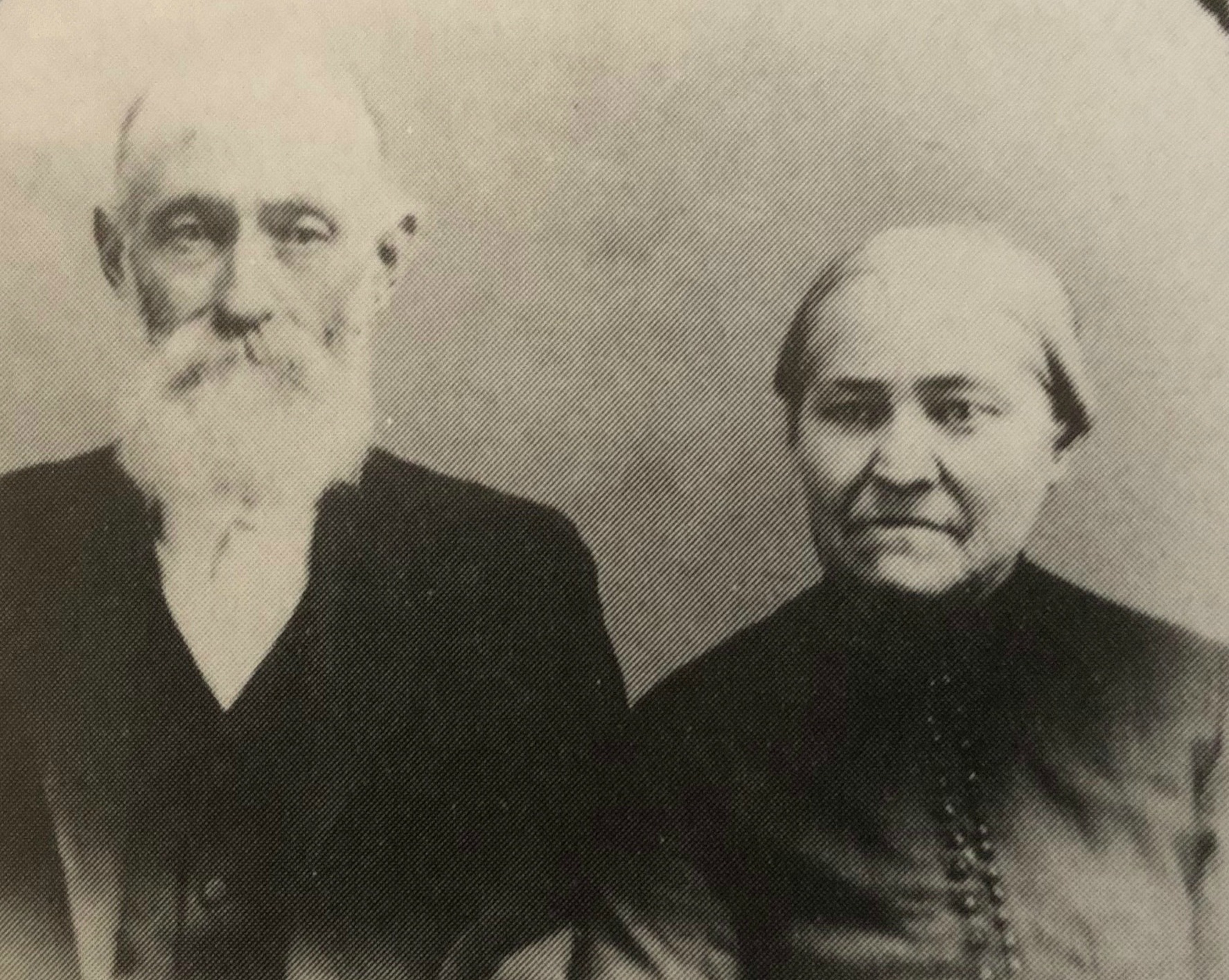
- Green & Susan McCord, 1885
- Born: Susan Noakes; October 7, 1829; Indiana, United States
- Died: 12 December 1909 (aged 80); Vernon, Indiana
- Known for: Artist; quilter
- Notable work: Vine quilt, circa 1885

Susan McCord (October 7, 1829 – December 12, 1909) was an American quilter. She is best known for her innovative designs and exquisite craftsmanship. Thirteen of McCord's quilts are included in the permanent collection of the Henry Ford Museum in Dearborn, Michigan.

== Biography ==
=== Early life ===
Susan Noakes was born on October 7, 1829, in Decatur County, Indiana to Amos and Mahala Noakes. In 1849, at the age of twenty, Noakes married schoolteacher, Green McCord in Hancock County, Indiana. In 1853, the McCord family moved to Iowa where they farmed for four years. In 1857, the family returned to Indiana and rented a farm near McCordsville, a town founded by Green McCord's family. They cleared twenty of the farm's eighty acres and built a small log cabin for their growing family.

Like other nineteenth century farmwives, McCord was responsible for the care, feeding, and clothing of her large family of nine as well as domestic chores. She managed the dairy, poultry and vegetable garden. McCord was also an avid flower gardener and participated in community gatherings and sewing bees. She hand sewed and knitted clothing and accessories for her family, embroidered linen and bedcovers, and created at least thirteen quilts during her lifetime.

=== Quilting ===
McCord created her quilts with left-over material that she had on hand, including pieces of her family's worn-out clothing. The fabrics she most often used were roller-printed cotton calicos, wool flannel and dress velvets. For the backing of her quilts, McCord often pieced together small scraps of muslin. McCord found inspiration for her quilt designs from the world around her. Quilt historian Barbara Brackman writes, "McCord was an artist. She saw everyday things in the way that other's didn't, drawing inspiration from her flower garden, the dishes in her china cabinet, the leaves on the trees in the farmyard."

McCord produced all of her quilts between 1860 and 1900. She was an imaginative quilt maker. She based each of her quilts on traditional patterns, but interpreted the patterns in her own unique way. She often crafted her quilts with original details and techniques that were new to quilt making. Her color choices, attention to detail, and unique interpretation of traditional designs made her work exceptional. McCord was also a needleworker. She used thousands of tiny, even stitches in her work, typically 10 stitches to the inch.

=== Later life and death ===
In December, 1909, at the age of 80, McCord contracted pneumonia after being kicked by a cow she had been milking; she lay on the frozen ground for hours before being discovered. She died December 12, 1909. McCord and her husband are buried in the Oaklandon Cemetery in Marion County, Indiana. McCord's quilts were passed down to members of her family.

== Recognition ==
=== American folk art revival ===
During the 1970s, the nationwide celebration of the United States Bicentennial inspired a renewed interest in American History and American folk art. In 1971, the Whitney Museum of American Art in New York City held the first major quilt exhibition in the United States. Quilt collecting and quilt making soon became so popular in America, a new word, "quiltmania" was born. Handmade quilts that had been stashed in basements and attics were brought out of storage and re-examined. "Grandma's quilts" were now being viewed as important and possibly valuable antiques.

1n 1973, McCord's granddaughter, Ruth Canaday, sold ten of her grandmother's quilts to the Henry Ford Museum. The museum later acquired two more McCord quilts. The last quilt belonging to the McCord's family, the Triple Irish Chain quilt, originally made for McCord's daughter, Millie McCord Canaday in 1900, was sold to the Henry Ford Museum by her great-great-grandson's family in 2012.

=== Exhibition history ===
On display at the Henry Ford Museum during the early 1970s, Susan McCord's quilts soon gained national attention. In 1981, McCord'a work was featured in a major art exhibition of 100 American quilts at the Oakland Museum of California. The four month long show, titled American Quilts, A Handmade Legacy, broke all previous attendance records. Placed in a prominent position near the entrance of the exhibit was McCord's most famous quilt, Vine, described in an exhibition art review as "a masterful work" and the "Sistine Chapel of quilts". Made from clothing remnants from her children and grandchildren, the quilt consists of thirteen panels of appliqué vines. Each vine is made with over three hundred leaves and strip-pieced buds, with over 9.000 pieces hand-sewn in intricate detail.

McCord's Vine quilt was included in the one hundred quilt, "World of Quilts" exhibition, held at Oakland University, Rochester Hills, Michigan in September, 1983. The show included some of the best examples of American quilts from museums and public and private collections throughout the world.

== Works ==
Thirteen Susan McCord quilts are in the permanent collection of the Henry Ford Museum.

- Harrison Rose Floral Quilt, circa 1860
- Floral Urn Quilt, circa 1860
- Turkey Tracks Quilt, circa 1880
- Ocean Waves Quilt, circa 1880
- Crazy Quilt, circa 1880-1900
- Vine Quilt, circa 1880-1890
- Diamond Field Quilt, circa 1890
- Feather Star Quilt, circa 1890
- Crazy Quilt, circa 1895
- Pine Tree Quilt, circa 1900
- Triple Irish Chain with Vine Border Quilt, circa 1900
- Fan Variation Quilt, circa 1900
- Hexagon Mosaic Quilt, circa 1900
