= African American Artists Collective KC =

The African American Artists Collective is a group of Black and African American artists in Kansas City that serves to connect and provide opportunities for Black artists in Kansas City and surrounding communities. The product of a 2014 meeting at Gates Barbecue with Congressman Emanuel Cleaver II and his assistant Jim Vaughan, Kansas City artists Glenn North, Diallo Javonne French, Gerald Dunn, Jason Piggie, NedRa Bonds and Sonié Joi Thompson-Ruffin started hosting regular meetings and gaining press coverage for their work in the Kansas City community.

Active members include Michael Toombs, Jason Piggie, Tyrone Aiken, Michael Brantley, Sonié Joi Thompson-Ruffin, NedRa Bonds, Michael Patton, Ramona Davis, Frank Norfleet, Harold Smith, Joseph A. Newton, Everett Freeman, Gerald Dunn, Michelle Beasley, LeRoy Beasley, Clarissa Knighten, Joseph T. Newton, Jason Wilcox, Leonard Le'Doux, Jr. and Kreshaun Mckinney.

The organization mentors artists and provides an outlet for them to showcase their work.
