= Sally Mae Pettway Mixon =

American artist (born 1965)

Sally Mae Pettway Mixon (born 1965) is an American artist. She is associated with the Gee's Bend quilting collective, alongside her mother, Candis Pettway, and her sisters Qunnie Pettway and Edwina Pettway.

Her work Blocks and Strips (2003) is in the permanent collection of the National Gallery of Art, where it was featured in the exhibition Called to Create: Black Artists of the American South (September 18, 2022 – March 26, 2023, curated by Harry Cooper). Her work was also featured in the Assembly: New Acquisitions by Contemporary Black Artists exhibit at The Blanton Museum of Art (December 11, 2021 – September 4, 2022).
