= Loretta Pettway Bennett =

American artist and quilter (born 1960)

Loretta Pettway Bennett (born December 29, 1960) is an American artist. She is associated with the Freedom Quilting Bee, where her mother, Qunnie Pettway, worked, and with the Gee's Bend quiltmakers. She is a prolific artist and culture-bearer, dedicated to propagating her community's traditions for future generations.

== Early life ==
Loretta Pettway Bennett was born on a farm in Gee's Bend, Alabama, to Qunnie Pettway and Tom O. Pettway. She and her siblings frequently worked on her grandfather, Tank Pettway's, farm growing cotton, corn, peanuts, and sweet potatoes, among other crops. Bennett remarks on the naming traditions of Gee's Bend using her family as an example:

"Aunt Lucy was the sister of my father, Tom O. Pettway, Jr. An interesting thing is that Aunt Lucy's middle name was Tomo. Because so many people in Gee's Bend have the name of Pettway, people get middle names that let others know who their fathers are, so nobody marries a close cousin by mistake. My father and his father carry the middle initial O. for Ottaway, a name that goes back to an original Pettway slave called Ottaway."

Bennett's family home did not receive running water or paved roads until 1975, when she was 15 years old. Previously, the family would haul water buckets from neighbors' homes or nearby wells and springs. Gee's Bend schools went through desegregation in Bennett's seventh grade year, and were shut down shortly thereafter. In order to continue her education, Bennett was required to take a crowded school bus two hours each morning and night to reach schools in neighboring counties. This arduous trek made participating in extracurricular activities nearly impossible. Nonetheless, Bennett graduated and married her high school sweetheart, Lovett "Bennett" Bennett on July 7, 1979.

== Marriage, travels, and return to Gee's Bend ==
Bennett's husband enlisted in the U.S. Army immediately after graduation, and they spent the next twenty years moving with the military. During her husband's military career, Bennett and her family lived in Germany, El Paso, Texas, and Georgia. While living in Germany and Texas, Bennett and her family traveled throughout Europe and the American southwest. They raised three boys and eventually settled down again in Gee's Bend, Alabama, after Bennett's grandmother, Candis Pettway, died in 1998. Bennett trained and worked as a medical and dental assistant while finding time to return to quilting and collaborate with her mother, Qunnie.

== Gee's Bend ==
The Gee's Bend quiltmakers are an all-female African-American group who have been taught quilting since the twentieth century in an Alabama town now called Gee's Bend (now Boykin). Both her mother, Qunnie, and her grandmother, Candis Mosley Pettway, are Gee's Bend quilters. Bennett's mother introduced her to the quilting tradition when she was five or six years old, although "At that age we were only allowed to thread the needles for the quilters in my grandmother's and my mother's quilting group." Every summer, her mother and aunts would train more sewing into her skill set, little by little. Her first completed quilt was a baby blanket, which was a home economics' project for her teacher's arriving grandchild. One of her known contributions to the Gee's Bend group is a jean-themed quilt made out of her husband and son's trousers. This technique reflects the group's main ideology, which is 'to make something shine from something that has been thrown away".

== Career ==
Throughout her travels in Europe and the American Southwest, Bennett marveled at each culture's distinct use of color. In regards to Germany, she noted that "The Germans were not big on having a lot of different colors, especially not on their houses, cars, and clothing, compared to Americans. But in the springtime things were different. I got to see another side of Germany, as many houses were decorated with flower boxes of red geraniums and pansies sitting on the window ledges, with white and black-trimmed houses in the background." Some of her pieces, such as her early 2000s, duo-tone blocks and strips works, remind the viewer of Bauhaus ways of color usage, or the organization of Piet Mondrian. She exchanged craft traditions with local Germans often, recalling that her neighbors taught her to knit and she sold a few of her mother's quilts among her friends in Germany.

Truly understanding the depth of Gee's Bend's quilts national importance overwhelmed Bennett when she first saw the quilts displayed at the Houston Museum of Fine Arts in 2002. She describes that moment as, "There my eyes were opened, and it touched me in a way as to question myself: Can I make a quilt that someday might hang on the wall of a museum?" Determined to carry on her ancestor's legacies, Bennett applied for and received a fellowship grant from the Alabama State Archive Council on the Arts to study the fine details of Gee's Bend quiltmaking. From this fellowship, her and her mother created a "Pine Burr" quilt, the state quilt of Alabama. Bennett donated this quilt to the Alabama Council of the Arts, where it now hangs on the walls of the Alabama Department of Archives and History.

Bennett's work is in the permanent collections of the Studio Museum in Harlem, The Legacy Museum and the Binghamton University Art Museum Her quilts Sew Low and Vegetation are part of the Eskenazi Health Art Collection.

== Artwork ==
Bennett has worked on countless of quilts throughout her career. Her first quilt, which she made at age 13, was a flower garden pattern. Bennett completed about 25 quilts between 2003 and 2006. Bennett usually designs her patterns on paper first, then colors them with crayons. She then pieces the patterns into quilts using old garments she collects from family and friends or scavenges at thrift shops, upholding the Gee Bend's concept of creative reuse. She builds them at home, using various rooms for different parts of the process. One of her distinct styles as an artist involves blowing up a single quilt square to the full size of a quilt, rather than repeating it as a small pattern.

Some of Bennett's notable quilts are:

- Two-Sided Geometric Quilt (2003)
- Work Clothes Strips (2003)
- Strips (2005)
- Medallion (2002)
