= Ella Mae Irby =

American quilt artist (1923–2001)

Ella Mae Irby (1923–2001) was an American artist. She is associated with the Gee's Bend quilting collective, along with her mother, Delia Bennett, and her daughter Linda Diane Bennett. Her work has been exhibited at the Museum of Fine Arts, Houston.

== Early life ==
Irby describes growing up in rural poverty during the early 20th century as difficult and often futile:

We farmed. Lived on the Brown plantation, under what they called "landlords." Cotton, corn, peas, sorghum syrup, hogs, cows ... Back at that time you worked for thirty cents, forty cents a day, and out of that you pay the landlords. ... Time was hard. They call it "advancing" back in those days.

Irby and her family were obligated to pick cotton in exchange for rent on the plantations' grounds on which they lived and sharecropped.

Irby had her first child, and fellow quilter, Lou Ida Bennett when she was 28 years old. She married Addison Irby when she was 32 years old.

== Work ==
Irby learned to sew from her mother, who used to dye and fashion church ensembles for her children from fertilizer sacks. Quilting was taught through the matriarchal lineage of her family and was widely practiced.
