= Linda Diane Bennett =

American artist (1955–1988)

Linda Diane Bennett

Linda Diane Bennett (1955–1988) was an American artist associated with the Gee's Bend group of quilters.

Her work is included in the collection of the Metropolitan Museum of Art.

== Early life ==
Like her mother, Ella Mae Irby, and her grandmother, Delia Bennett, Linda Diane Bennett was born and raised in Gee's Bend, Alabama. She balanced year-round school and farming, along with her parents and siblings. Once completing high school, she became deputy sheriff of Wilcox County, Alabama. She also worked in the courthouse. Bennett died unexpectedly at her job at the courthouse in 1988.

== Work ==
Bennett borrowed heavily from her mother and grandmother's aesthetic and practice. She worked quietly and without a "horse" or frame—working completely free-hand from her lap.
