= Velda Newman =

American artist

Velda Newman is a contemporary American quilter from Nevada City in Northern California, specializing in close-up depictions of the natural world. Common subjects for her quilts are based in nature focused on flowers, fruit, and fish. She does much of her work by hand including stitching and dying of the fabric.

Newman has received numerous national and international quilting awards, including her quilt "Hydrangea" being listed as one of "The 20th Century's 100 Best Quilts." Newman is also the author of two books, A Workshop with Velda Newman: Adding Dimension to your Quilts and Velda Newman: A Painter's Approach to Quilt Design.
