= Florine Smith =

American artist (born 1948)

Florine Smith (born 1948) is an American artist associated with the Gee's Bend group of quilters.

Her work is included in the collection of the Fine Arts Museums of San Francisco.

== Work ==
Florine Smith sketches her patterns before beginning to cut and piece together her quilt. This is a rare method of quilting in Gee's Bend, but once Smith begins to cut and sew, she moves to an improvisation of her own pattern. "Her patterns are frequently dictated in part by the physical limitations of her fabrics—since corduroy is prone to raveling and fraying, her quilts typically are made with large, simple rectangular pieces."

Smith travels around the country teaching quilting workshops that rely on minimal tool usage and simple techniques. She is a national ambassador for the Gee's bend quilting tradition and legacy.
