= Emma Lee Pettway Campbell =

American artist

Emma Lee Pettway Campbell (1928–2002) was an American artist associated with the Gee's Bend group of quilters. She was included in the 2013 History Refused to Die exhibition at the Metropolitan Museum of Art. Her work is included in the collection of the Metropolitan Museum of Art, to which it was donated by the Souls Grown Deep Foundation.
