= Pearlie Kennedy Pettway =

African American quilter (1920–1982)

- Born: 1920; Boykin, Alabama, U.S.
- Died: 1982 (aged 61–62)
- Known for: Quilting
- Notable work: "Bars" Work-Clothes Quilt (ca. 1950), Triangles Creating Squares-Within-Squares Motif (ca. 1960)
- Movement: Gee's Bend Collecive

Pearlie Kennedy Pettway (1920–1982) was an American quilter. She was among the quilters of Gee's Bend. Her works are in the Metropolitan Museum of Art.

Pearlie Kennedy was born in Boykin, Alabama (Gee's Bend) in 1920. She had a brother, Herman Kennedy. She married Horace Pettway, who was the brother of her brother's wife, Mary Elizabeth Pettway.

Pettway created her Triangles quilt around 1960. The quilt, also known as Triangles Creating Squares-within-Squares (Housetop) Motif, is made from cotton sacking material. It is included in the collection of the Metropolitan Museum of Art, a gift of the Souls Grown Deep Foundation in 2014. Once clothing was no longer able to be mended, Pettway would use the material from coverall pants, dresses, and skirts to create quilts. Her quilt Bars, made c. 1950, was crafted using cotton and denim work-clothes. According to her daughter Florida Irby, Pettway also sewed clothing using 25 lb. flour sacks and cloth that she acquired in Camden, using the leftover fabric to make quilts.

Pettway died in 1982 in Boykin.
