= Mary E. Bennett =

- Born: 1813
- Died: December 1, 1899; Fulham
- Spouse: John Bennett
- Relatives: John Saunders

Mary E. Bennett (1813 – December 1, 1899) was a British novelist.

Mary Bennett was born in 1813, likely the daughter of John Saunders an Sarah Northcote of Exeter. Her brother was novelist and publisher John Saunders and she worked with him on the poetry anthology Songs for the Many, by Two of the People (1834). In 1838 she married novelist and publisher John Bennett and they would have four daughters. The Bennett's collaborated on editing the Boys' and Girls' Companion starting in 1857.

A number of Bennett's works are novels which the Dictionary of National Biography characterizes as "historical melodramas in the style of Harrison Ainsworth", such as The Cottage Girl (1838) and The Gipsey Bride (1840). One of these, The Jew's Daughter (1837), is a reworking of the antisemitic legend of Little Saint Hugh of Lincoln. In Bennett's tale, the title character, Judith, is innocent of the murder of Hugh and freed by kind. She converts to Protestant Christianity and marries Hugh's father.

She lived in poverty following the deaths of her brother and husband. She died on 1 December 1899 in Fulham.

== Bibliography ==
1. The Canadian Girl: or, The Pirate of the Lakes. A Story of the Affections. 1 vol. London: John Bennett, 1838.
2. The Jew's Daughter: or, The Witch of the Water-side. 1 vol. London: John Saunders, 1839.
3. The Gipsy Bride: or, The Miser's Daughter. A Tale of the Sixteenth Century. 1 vol. London: W. Nicholson & Sons, 1841.
4. The Cottage Girl: or, The Marriage-Day. 1 vol. London: William Bennett, 1842.
5. Madge Gordon: or, the Misletoe Bough. London, 1843.
6. The Boy's Own Book of Stories from History. London: 1848.
7. Jane Shore: or, The Goldsmith's Wife. 1 vol. London: Henry Lea, 1849.
8. Don't Tell: or, Mistaken Kindness. 1 vol. London: Henry Lea, 1858.
9. Martha Bell: or, The Old Abbey Farm. 1 vol. London: Henry Lea, 1860.
10. Never Mind: or, The Lost Home. 1 vol. London: Henry Lea, 1860.
11. The Orphan Sisters; or, the Lover's Secret. London: 1860.
12. Stella. 3 vol. London: John Maxwell, 1864.
13. The Book of Birthdays, or Anniversary Poetry of Human Life. London: 1868.
14. Elinor Clare; or, the Haunted Oak. London: 1868.
