= Lottie Mooney =

American artist (1908–1992)

Lottie Mooney (1908–1992) was an American artist associated with the Gee's Bend group of quilters. In 2010 her 1940 quilt "Housetop"—four-block "Half-Log Cabin" variation appeared in a US postage stamp series commemorating the quilters of Gee's Bend.
