= Gloria Hoppins =

American artist (born 1955)

- Born: 1955 (age 70–71); Boykin, Alabama, U.S.
- Occupation: Artist
- Parent(s): Richard Pettway; Linda Pettway

Gloria Hoppins (born 1955) is an American artist associated with the Gee's Bend group of quilters.

Her work is included in the collection of the Brooklyn Museum.

== Life ==
Born in Gee's Bend, Hoppins' parents were Linda and Richard Pettway. Hoppins comes from a rich lineage of quilt-makers, such as her grandmother, Virginia Pettway, her mother, Linda Pettway, and her sister Lucy L. Witherspoon. She remains active in her community, singing in the gospel choir group Ye Shall Know the Truth.
