= Candis Pettway =

American artist (1924–1997)

Candis Mosely Pettway (November 25, 1924 – May 22, 1997) was an American artist. She is associated with the Freedom Quilting Bee and the Gee's Bend group of quilters, alongside her daughters Qunnie Pettway, Sally Mae Pettway, and Edwina Pettway.

== Life ==
Candis Mosely married Tank Pettway and together they raised sixteen children. For a time, they also took care of their niece Loretta Pettway. After most of her children grew up, she began working as kitchen staff at the local elementary school. In her late 50s she developed heart problems and could no longer work. She died in 1997 at the age of 73.

== Work ==
After she fell ill from heart complications, Pettway frequently gathered a small quilting bee at her home to make painstakingly meticulous quilts. Her bee typically comprised her aunt Allie Pettway, Lucy Mingo, and Allie's daughter, Lola Pettway.
