= Patty Ann Williams =

American artist (1898–1972)

Patty Ann Williams (1898 – 1972) was an American artist associated with the Gee's Bend group of quilters.

In 2006 her quilt Medallion with checkerboard center appeared on a US Postal service stamp as part of a series commemorating Gee's bend quilters.

== Life ==
Patty Ann Williams was the mother of Liza Jane Williams, Eddie Lee Williams, and Cornelius Williams, and the grandmother of Patty Irby. Patty Ann raised her children and her grandchildren in an off-grid house tucked into the woods of Rehoboth, Alabama. They did not receive electricity until the mid-1960s. Before that, they cooked their food and heated their house by a wood-burning stove. Especially towards her older years, Patty Ann stayed in the house, cooking, while her kin worked in the fields on their tenant farm.

== Work ==
Williams' quilts were made to keep her children and grandchildren warm. Her grand-daughter, Patty Irby, recalled that, instead of concentrating on artistic value, "They never really thought about it; whatever was too old to wear, they just tore it up to make quilts." Although most of their quilts were made from repurposed materials, some of their quilts were made from scraps sold in bulk at a discount from Selma, Alabama.
