= Sandy Bonsib =

American quilter and quilting instructor

Sandy Bonsib is an American picture framer and quilting instructor who resides in Issaquah, Washington. She is a frequent quilting teacher, has been featured on PBS, and is the author of multiple books on quilting technique, including Quilting Your Memories, Quilting More Memories, Folk Art Quilts, etc., primarily for Martingale and Company.

== Bibliography ==
- Memory Quilts: 21 Heartwarming Projects with Special Techniques
- Sweet Treats: 12 Delectable Quilts from 2 Easy Blocks
- Quilting Your Memories: Inspirations for Designing With Image Transfers
- Quilting More Memories: Creating Projects With Image Transfers
- Tried And True: New Quilts From Favorite Blocks
- Folk Art Quilts: A Fresh Look
- Flannel Quilts
- Americana Quilts
