= Mary L. Bennett =

American artist (born 1942)

- Born: 1942 (age 83–84); Gee's Bend, Alabama, U.S.
- Movement: Gee's Bend quilters
- Family: Delia Bennett (grandmother)

Mary L. Bennett (born 1942) is an American artist. She is associated with the Gee's Bend quilting collective. Bennett came from a family of quilters originating with the matriarch of the family her grandmother, Delia Bennett. Her work is included in the collection of the Museum of Fine Arts, Houston, and National Gallery of Art.

== Early life ==
Bennett was born to mother Lucille Bennett and father Finest Major. She was raised by her grandmother Delia Bennett in the brown's Quarters region of Gee's Bend. She began work at age 10 or 11 working in her uncle, Stalling Bennett's, farm. She received very little schooling, and ceased farm work after the death of her grandfather. At the age of 12 or 13 she began teaching herself to quilt by watching her grandmother.
