= Diallo Javonne French =

American film director

- Born: 1971, Kansas City, Kansas
- Nationality: American
- Education: Clark Atlanta University
- Known for: Filmmaking, photography
- Notable work: May This Be Love, Kansas City Dreamin': Music in the Shadows
- Awards: Urban Mediamakers Film Festival

Diallo Javonne French (born 1971 in Kansas City) is a filmmaker and photographer. His film May This Be Love aired on the BET program Lens on Talent in 2009 and won first place at the Urban Mediamakers Film Festival.

== Early life ==
French grew up in Kansas City, Kansas. He started out as a musician but switched to filmmaking at 19 years old when he bought an 8mm camera from a pawn shop. He taught himself production shooting creating 8mm and 16mm short films. From 1994 to 1996, French attended Clark Atlanta University in Atlanta, Georgia. While in Georgia, he worked as a music video production assistant for “Creep” by TLC, “Call Therapy” by Goodie Mob, “Benz or a Beemer” by Outkast, and “Tonight” by Xscape. In 2001 French returned to Kansas City and began working at the American Jazz Museum in the historic 18th and Vine district which sparked his interest in jazz photography.

== Film career ==
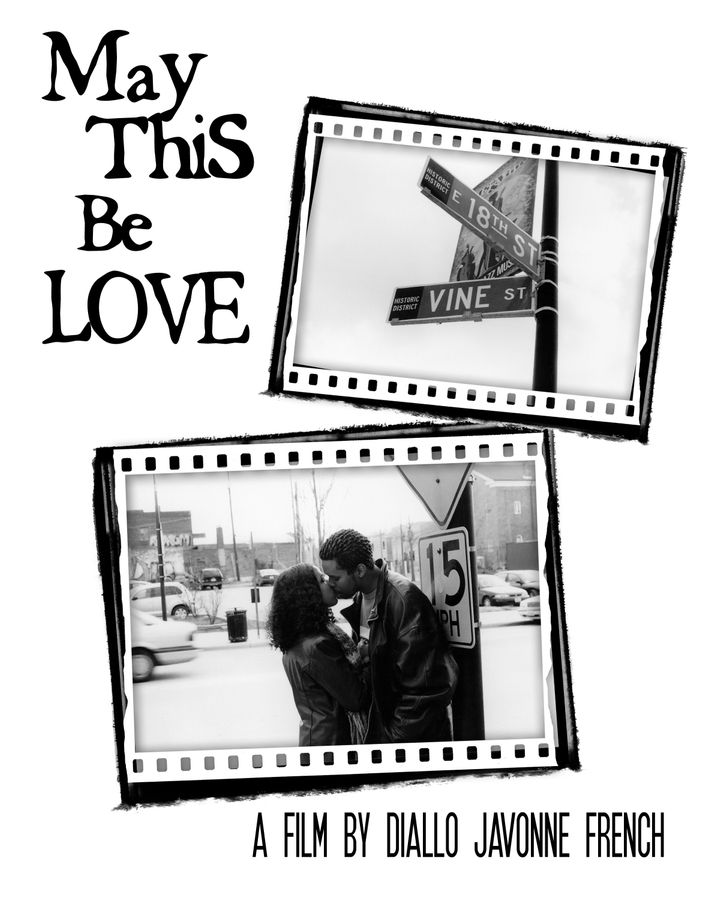
Poster for the film May This Be Love.

=== May This Be Love (2006) ===
In 2006 French wrote and directed the short film ‘’May This Be love’’, starring Kevin “Kre8” Browne and Keisha McGautha. The film, shot in black and white 35 mm, follows the story of two lovers set against the backdrop of jazz music and a poem by Kansas City poet Glenn North. May This Be Love won first place at the Urban Mediamakers Film Festival in 2007 and aired on the BET series Lens on Talent in 2009. It was shown at the San Francisco Film Festival and the Spaghetti Junction Urban Film Festival.

=== Pay Respects (2015) ===
A selectee of the Kansas City Film Festival in 2016, ‘’Pay Respects’’ is an experimental short film about the history of African American music.

=== Kansas City Dreamin’ : Music in the Shadows (2016) ===
Kansas City Dreamin’ is a documentary about French capturing the Kansas City Jazz community through black and white photography over a decade and interviews with musicians especially Bobby Watson. French also included Kansas City natives Janelle Monae, Marva Whitney and Tech N9ne, to “inspire the next generation, those kids who are in Paseo [High School] now” with their music.

=== A Song For You (2019) ===
A love story about a soul singer and what inspires him to make music. It stars Kansas City native Anthony Saunders who is a singer songwriter. The film includes music from Kansas City jazz, R&B, and hip hop artists, and "a percentage of the film's proceeds will go towards music education in the Kansas City area".

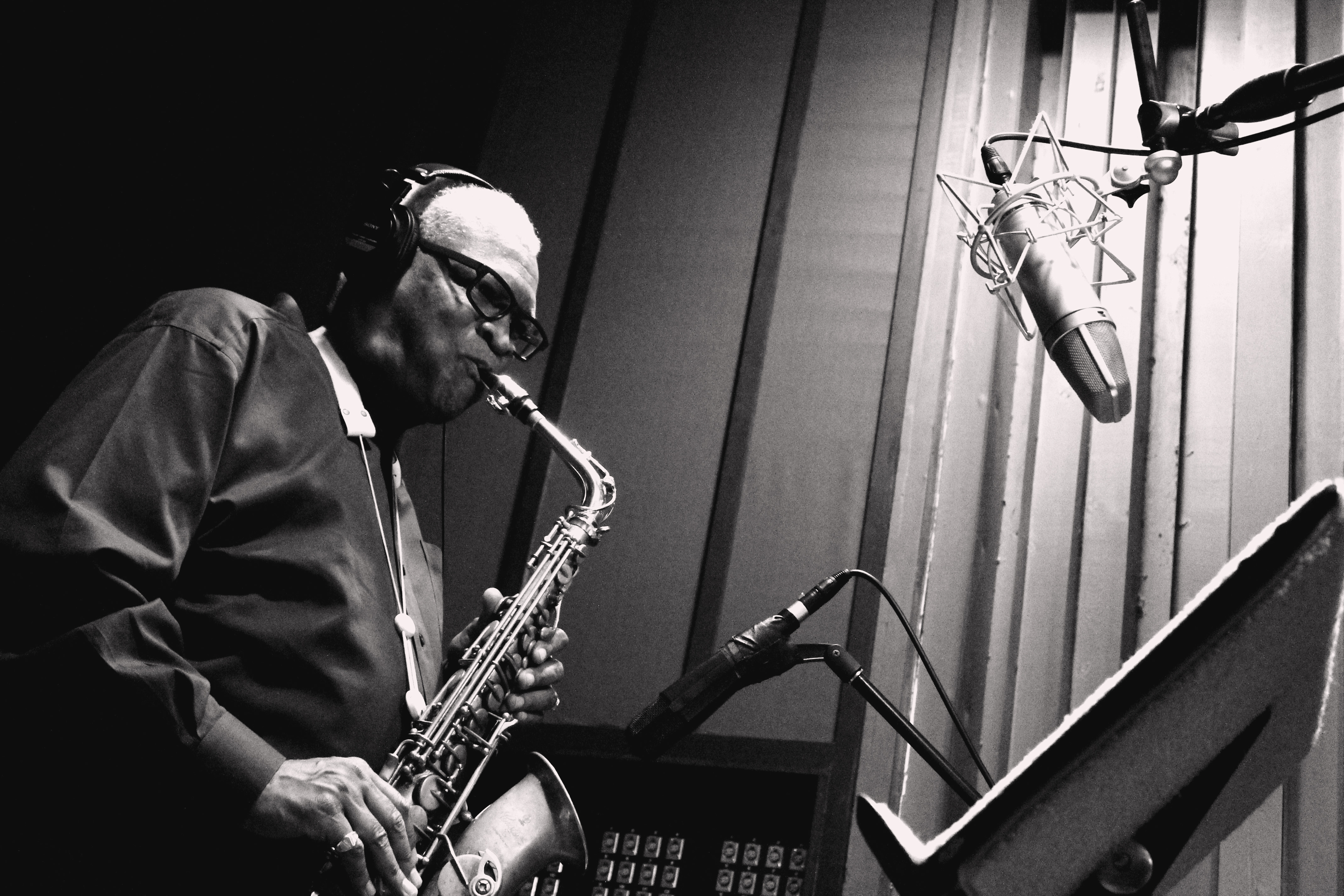
Photograph of Jazz Musician Bobby Watson taken by French

== Photography career ==
French's photography has been showcased in venues such as the American Jazz Museum, The Box Gallery, Buttonwood Art Space, and on Hallmark cards. His photographs, shot in black and white without studio lighting, capture the Kansas City Jazz scene. Saxophonist Bobby Watson once told French, “You really captured something. You’re not just taking pictures, you’re documenting,” something that French says he will always remember.

== Style and influence ==
French uses black and white film to create a sense of timelessness in his films and photography with a focus around music and romantic love. Being influenced by jazz music, French says "photographing jazz musicians in their element, usually in a dimly lit atmosphere, never using flash, only natural light, allows me to become a part of the music while I'm shooting; attempting to capture a pure moment of musical expression."

== Solo exhibitions ==
- 2013-2014, KC Swing: Jazz Photography, The Box Gallery, Kansas City MO
- 2013, Jazz Photography, Vine Street Studio, Kansas City MO

== Group exhibitions ==
- 2018 What's Going On, Leedy-Voulkos Art Gallery, Kansas City, MO
- 2017 Arts KC, ArtsKC, Kansas City MO
- 2015 Jazz Then & Now, American Jazz Museum, Kansas City, MO
- 2011 The Note Illustrated Buttonwood Art Space, Kansas City MO
- 2011 Reflections of Jazz American Jazz Museum, Kansas City MO

== Screenings ==
- 2017 National Archives at Kansas City
- 2017 ArtsKC
- 2016 Black Archives of Mid America
- 2009 BET airing

== Awards and recognitions ==
- 2016 Selectee Kansas City Film Festival
- 2014 Trailblazer honor Kansas City Jewish Film Festival
- 2010 Selectee Kansas City Urban Film Festival
- 2007 Selectee San Francisco Film Festival
- 2007 Selectee Spaghetti Junction Urban Film Festival
- 2007 1st-place winner Urban Mediamakers Film Festival
- 2006 Selectee Urban Film Series
