= Paula Nadelstern =

American artist, quiltmaker, author, and teacher (born 1951)

Paula Nadelstern (born 1951, Bronx, NY) is an American artist, quiltmaker, author and teacher known for her kaleidoscope-themed quilts.

Nadelstern has achieved international recognition, including a one-person exhibition at the American Folk Art Museum in New York City in 2009, Kaleidoscope Quilts: The Art of Paula Nadelstern. This exhibition marked the first one-person show at that museum of work by a contemporary quilt maker.

One of her quilts is in the permanent collection of the American Folk Art Museum and was included in the exhibition Self-Taught Genius: Treasures from the American Folk Art Museum, which toured nationally from 2014 to 2017.

She is the author of numerous books including Paula Nadelstern's Kaleidoscope Quilts: An Artist's Journey Continues; Kaleidoscope Quilts: The Workbook; Puzzle Quilts: Simple Blocks, Complex Fabric; Kaleidoscopes & Quilts and Snowflakes & Quilts.

== Awards ==
- New York Foundation for the Arts grants, 2001, 1995
- Bronx Council for the Arts BRIO Awards, 2018, 1996
