= Lola Pettway =

American artist (born 1941)

- Born: 1941 (age 84–85)

Lola Pettway (born 1941) is an American artist. She is associated with the Gee's Bend quilting collective, along with her mother, Allie Pettway. Her work has been exhibited at the Museum of Fine Arts, Houston and the Frist Art Museum, and is included in the collection of the Metropolitan Museum of Art.

== Life ==
From a long line of quilters, Lola's grandmother was Henrietta Pettway and her mother was Allie Pettway. Her father was John the Baptist Pettway.

She was raised alongside nine sisters and four brothers. She began taking on family responsibilities at a young age. She began cooking at nine, working in the fields at ten, and quilting around the same age. She was very competitive with her older brother, Ebenezer: "...if he picked two hundred pounds, I’d pick two hundred, too."

Lola married and raised twelve children.

== Work ==
Preferring the more active parts of making a quilt, Lola preferred to quilt rather than to piece it together. She recalled the immense work that went into completing a quilt saying:

"We had to use four frames and hang up in the loft. I pieced some quilts but I’d rather quilt. Rather quilt than put it up, ’cause there’s so much beating on the cotton to spread it out and then whip it onto the frame. Set the frame on blocks to whip it in. Piecing and quilting takes a lot of sitting down. I don’t like to be sitting down too long a time."
