= Mary Bennett Peterson =

Mary Bennett Peterson (died November 23, 2011, in Washington, D.C.) was an American author and lobbyist.

Peterson was born in Cleveland. In 1949, she graduated from the College of Wooster in Wooster, Ohio, and then went on to study economics at New York University. From 1964 to 1973, she wrote reviews for The Wall Street Journal′s ″Reading for Business″ column. She also worked for the William H. Donner Foundation in New York City and as a stockbroker in Princeton, N.J. In 1971, she published the book The Regulated Consumer. Introduced by Milton Friedman, it made the case against consumer protection by government in favor of free-market policies. From 1973 until the 1990s, she was a lobbyist and consultant for General Motors.

== Publications ==
- The Regulated Consumer. Ottawa, Illinois: Green Hill Publishers, 1971 (PDF at mises.org)
