= Jessie Telfair =

American textile artist (1913–1986)

- Born: January 1, 1913; Parrott, Georgia, U.S.
- Died: October 3, 1986 (aged 73); Parrott, Georgia, U.S.
- Known for: Freedom Quilt

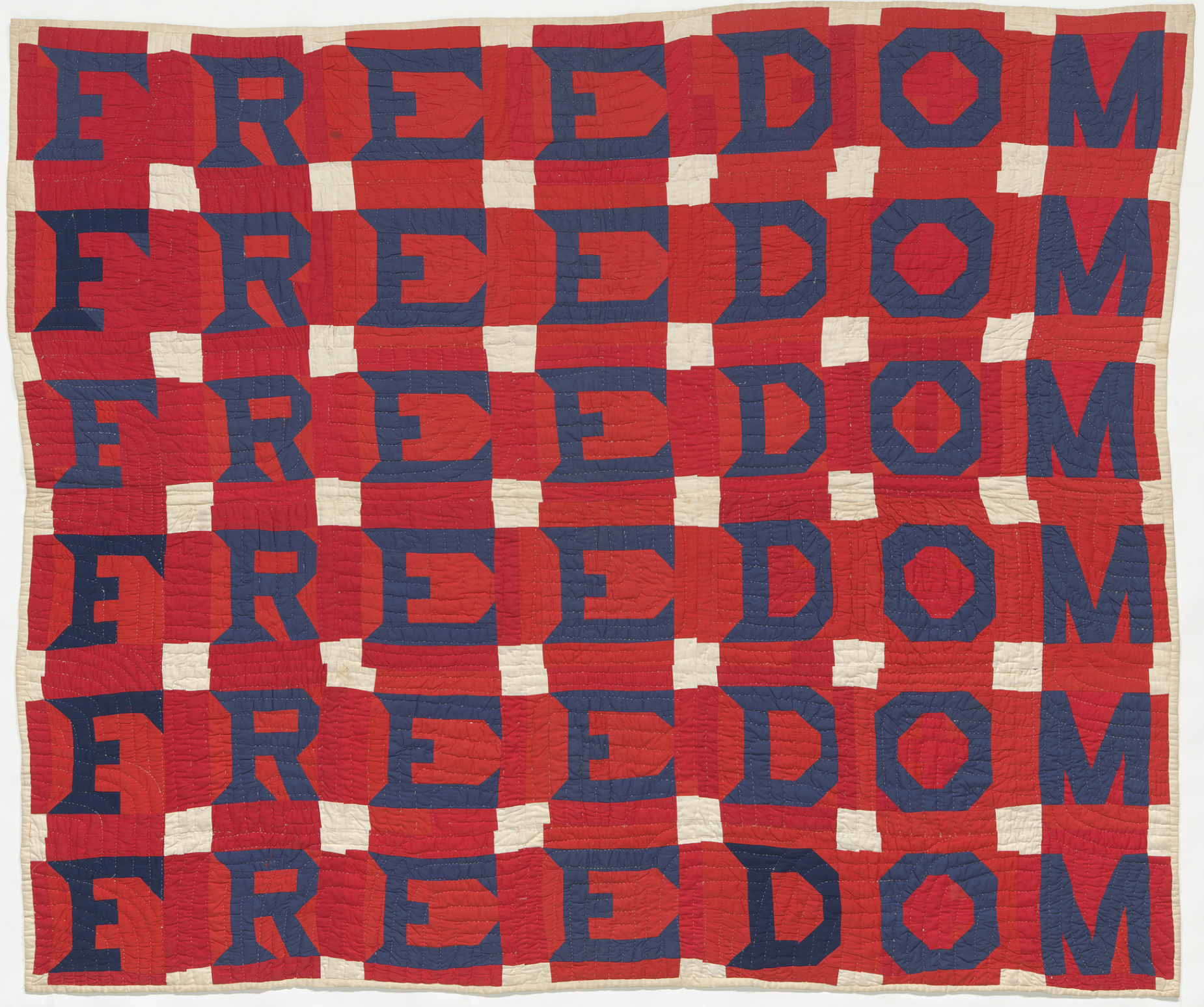
Freedom Quilt by Jessie Telfair

Jessie Bell “Sis” Williams Telfair (January 1, 1913 – October 3, 1986) was an American textile artist known for her quilt art.

Telfair was born in Terrell County, Georgia, the daughter of Ada Oxford Williams and Jim Williams, a farmer and carpenter. She learned to quilt from her mother. She married Samuel David Telfair, a farmer, and they had two daughters.

In 1963, Telfair decided to register to vote in her hometown of Parrott, Georgia, after encouragement from the by the Student Nonviolent Coordinating Committee. She was fired her from her job as an elementary school cafeteria worker. She made a red, white, and blue quilt in 1975 which she called Missing Pieces which had the word FREEDOM on it six times as an affirmation of her personal freedom. The quilt is a 73-inch-by-87-inch pieced and appliqued cotton quilt. Telfair exhibited her quilts at local folk festivals during her lifetime. Her original quilt was purchased by American folklife dealer and collectors Dr. and Mrs. Ng in 1981.

== Legacy ==
Telfair died in 1986, at the age of 73, in Georgia. Her Freedom quilt was on the cover of the James Renwick Alliance's Fall 2020 issue of Craft Quarterly. One of her quilts was sold at auction in 2023 for $98,400.

Her first quilt is in the collection of the National Museum of African American History and Culture and was part of their traveling exhibition American Perspectives. Three similar quilts with an additional seventh "freedom" on them were created in the 1980s. They are held by the American Folk Art Museum, the High Museum of Art in Atlanta and the Virginia Museum of Fine Arts.
