= Joanna Pettway =

American artist (1924–1993)

- Born: 1924; Gees Bend, Alabama
- Died: 1993 (aged 68–69); Gees Bend, Alabama
- Known for: textile artist

Joanna Pettway (1924 - 1993) was an American quilt artist and daughter of Gees Bend quilter Martha Jane Pettway.

== Biography ==
Pettway was born in 1924 in Gees Bend, Alabama. She was one of twelve children of Martha Jane and Little Pettway, living her whole life in Gees Bend. She is associated with the Gee's Bend group of quilters.

Joanna Pettway's work is in the collection of the Birmingham Museum of Art, the Montgomery Museum of Fine Arts, and the Philadelphia Museum of Art.
