= Lucy Mooney =

American artist and quilter (c.1880–1969)

Lucy Mooney (c. 1880 – 1969) was an American artist. She is associated with the Gee's Bend quilting collective and worked for the Freedom Quilting Bee. Despite losing an arm before she began working at the Bee, she was an accomplished quilter. Pete Seeger owned one of her quilts. Her work has been exhibited in the Museum of Fine Arts, Houston and the Frist Art Museum.

== Life ==
Mooney and her husband Needom worked as domestic attendants to the Sandy Hill house, the former Van de Graaff plantation in Gee's Bend. W.C. Travis was their employer in residence at the time.
