= Mensie Lee Pettway =

American artist (born 1939)

Mensie Lee Pettway (born 1939) is an American artist associated with the Gee's Bend group of quilters.

Her work is included in the collection of the National Museum of African American History and Culture and the Milwaukee Art Museum.

== Life ==
The daughter of accomplished quilter America Irby, and granddaughter of Hannah Wilcox, Mensie Lee Pettway grew up with much communal support. She farmed most of her life and went to school during the off season (November–February). She completed high school at 21 years old. Afterwards, she married Robert Lee Pettway, farmed with him, and raised seven children.

Mensie Lee enjoyed picking cotton and after helping her family harvest their own, she often went to a white family's house, the Joe McHugh family, and picked 200 pounds (91 kg) of cotton in one day. She recalls, "I loved cooking and pulling cotton. I could pull two hundred pounds in a day. You get three dollars a hundred back then. That was a lot of money around 1958 when I was in the tenth grade."

Mensie Lee still lives in Alberta, Alabama.

== Work ==
Mensie Lee was one of the founding members of the Freedom Quilting Bee when it was first established at Estelle Witherspoon's house. Her primary job was cutting patterns for other members to sew. She could cut three or four patterns in one day, and often helped other women sew the patterns to keep up with demands. Her grandmother, Hannah Wilcox, would top and quilt the patterns. She worked at the Bee during its entire existence.

Even after Mensie Lee returned home from the Bee at the end of the day, she would work on her own quilts. More free-form and improvisational, her patterns began as "Nine Patch" quilts, but morphed during the process into, what the artist deemed, "This and That" patchwork. She described her method:

"I may start off looking like planning a "Nine Patch," but then I take this, take that, take patches, blocks, strips, and seeing where I am going, laying my pattern as I go. I start out with about an eighteen-inch block. That block give you a start with the color and design. I may put that block at the end or in the middle, and then I may go around it and keep going around until it got big enough. Sometime I may make a bunch of blocks and put them together. Sometime I may start it at the bottom and go up like a stepladder. But not ever the same way twice."

Her method yielded quilts with finger-print uniqueness, where no two quilts, or even two sides of the same quilt, looked alike.
