= Lydia Beachy =

American quilter (1863–1925)

Lydia Miller Beachy
- Born: 1863; Grantsville, Maryland
- Died: 1925 (aged 61–62); Arthur, Illinois
- Known for: quilting

Lydia Miller Beachy (1863–1925) was an American quilter born in Grantsville, Maryland. Her work is included in the collections of the Smithsonian American Art Museum and the Illinois State Museum.
