= Viola Canady =

American artist (1922–2009)

- Born: Viola Canady; November 3, 1922
- Died: March 21, 2009 (aged 86)
- Known for: Quilting
- Notable work: Cathedral Window Quilt

Viola Canady (November 3, 1922 – March 21, 2009) was an African American quiltmaker. Canady discovered her passion for quilting through exposure to its processes as a child. She was the co-founder of the Daughters of Dorcas and Sons Quilting Guild of Washington, D.C. Canady created a wall hanging for the Charles Sumner school and it is exhibited at the Sumner museum. One of Canady's most notable pieces is the Cathedral Window Quilt.

== Biography ==
Viola Canady was born on November 3, 1922, to Charlie Williams and Lillie Grady. She grew up in Goldsboro, North Carolina, before moving to Washington, D.C. in 1945. In 1960, she began to work as a tailor for the US Army sewing uniforms, most notably working on the uniform of General Douglas MacArthur. In 1979, she retired from the Army before co-founding the Daughters of Dorcas and Sons Quilting Guild in 1980. In addition to her career as a tailor, she made, showed, and sold her products. She also taught for the National Quilters Association. As women started to express interest in quilting, Canady started to teach them at her local church. This marked the birth of the Daughters of Dorcas and Sons Quilting Guild.

== Daughters of Dorcas and Sons Quilting Guild ==
=== Background ===
Viola Canady learned to sew and quilt by helping her mother and grandmother put together quilt tops to sell. The majority of quilts they made were sold to white women who would display them as their own work. She grew very passionate about African American quilting and finding people to express the beauty of quilting. Canady has stated, "I couldn't find ... any black people who quilted" and that "most of the women I'd ask didn't want to quilt because they connected it with poverty, with the country, when everybody had to sleep on quilts". Canady thought that society had lost a lot of people who participated in the African American quilting tradition. She understood quilting as a key part of African American history, stating, "quilting is what we were about. If you wanted to stay warm, you had to quilt". To Canady, quilting had a special historical significance within the community.

=== Guild ===
The Daughters of Dorcas and Sons Quilting Guild was a group of amateur quiltmakers who were primarily African American. The guild is a division of the National Quilting Association. The Daughters of Dorcas and Sons Quilting Guild is the oldest African American quilting group. The group is named after the biblical character Dorca who was raised from the dead to work as a seamstress for the poor. They added the word "Sons" after three men joined the organization. In 1997, the group was made up of about 100 women and three men. They met weekly at church called the Calvary Episcopal Church where Viola and fellow members would teach their mastery in quilting to members of their community and create coverlets to help sick and homeless families. Within the guild, Viola was an influential organizer, teaching quilting and crafting techniques to her peers and local school children.

== Artistic work ==
After being inspired by the sky and her prayers, Canady created a wall hanging that depicted Charles Sumner School. She made the project by putting together hundreds of pieces of fabrics in a stained-glass style. The project was very meaningful to her because the Sumner School was opened in 1872 to educate black children in the District of Columbia. Many works by Canady and her group have been displayed at the Sumner museum. The museum turned to her to work on an artwork about the Sumner School. The work hangs in the museum's great hall.

Canady was well known for her jewel-toned quilts, particularly her Cathedral Window quilt in the Anacostia Community Museum. Her works are also included in the collection of the DC Commission on the Arts and Humanities.

Some of her other works include pieces called Kente Boy, African Woman, and African Lady with Braids.

== See also ==
- African-American art
- History of quilting
