= Charles Counts =

American potter, designer, textile artist, quilter, teacher, writer and activist

Charles Counts (1934–2000) was an American potter, designer, textile artist, quilter, teacher, writer, and activist. Counts worked to preserve the art forms of his native Appalachia, and later moved to Nigeria where he taught until his death.

== Early life and education ==
Counts was born in Lynch, Kentucky. Charles' ancestors were some of the early pioneering settlers of Russell County, Virginia, descending from John & Mary Counts of Glade Hollow, VA 1789. His parents were Arthur Richard Counts and Erma Colley Counts.

He moved with his parents to Oak Ridge, Tennessee in 1944. Counts graduated from Oak Ridge High School in 1952 and graduated from Berea College, Kentucky. Since 1893 Berea College has supported traditional Appalachian crafts and maintained workshops that teach technique and produce craft items. Students have the opportunity to study art, learn traditional skills and earn their tuition. Counts earned a master's degree in pottery and weaving at Southern Illinois University, Carbondale, in 1957, and then studied under Bauhaus-trained master potter, Marguerite Wildenhain at Pond Farm in Guerneville, California. He also did advanced work in ceramic technology at the University of Southern California under Carlton Ball and Susan Peterson.

== Early career ==
After two years in the U. S. Army, Counts returned to the Oak Ridge, Tennessee area in 1959 and opened a pottery at Beaver Ridge. In 1963 Counts moved his operation to Lookout Mountain, Georgia. A small artist's colony had sprung up at the New Salem Community near Rising Fawn, Georgia. The arts community provided a focal point for collectors and contributed to the economic success of the artists and crafts people living in the area. An annual event, the Plum Nelly Clothesline Crafts Fair, was organized at Rising Fawn by a print maker within the artist's community. Charles Counts received federal funding for an apprentice ceramics program for local people at their studio, The Pottery Shop. This community involvement led to a collaboration with a group of local traditional quilt makers, The Rising Fawn Quilters. Historians have posited that ceramics and weaving along with the Back-To-The-Land Movement of the 60s and 70s had a profound influence on the development of the studio art quilt.

== Artistic solidification ==
The Bauhaus Movement had a lasting effect on 20th century art and craft and influenced Charles Counts' work. The spare Bauhaus functional design principles were introduced to the United States as its exponents fled Nazi domination of Europe Visiting Japanese craftsmen's reverence for beauty, design, quality and utility also influenced crafts persons, including Charles Counts, after World War II After the passage of the G.I. Bill in 1944, craft and arts came together on college campuses across the nation. Counts was heir to two historic traditions, that of medieval Germany and Japan, including apprenticeship, hands on learning, practical and functional design and good workmanship. These ethics and aesthetics applied equally to the other art forms in which Counts worked. Counts' "discipleship" following his apprenticeship with Marguerite Wildenhain shows clearly with stark realistic representation of natural images used for three dimensional motifs on pots. Counts translated his motifs from nature on three dimensional pots to two dimensional murals created with ceramic "tiles" to tufted rugs and quilt designs, He adopted applique forms with curving lines of quilting stitches, frames of color unifying his quilt and images on batik dyed fabrics, Counts took advantage of products of local fabric mills and developed a partnership with the Rising Fawn Quilters, traditional Appalachian craftspeople who brought needlework skill that complemented the non-traditional character of Count's designs. Counts bemoaned the fact that established designs had creates a loss of creativity in traditional quilts. His designs were very different from traditional geometric quilts. After the "sandwich" of quilt top, wadding or batting and the backing fabric were placed into the quilting frame and the quilt was rolled around the side bars of the quilting frame making the center of the quilt accessible. Then Counts drew the quilting design directly on the exposed area of fabric of the center of the top using a ballpoint pen. As each section was completed the quilt was unrolled and Counts continued to mark the design on the exposed section.

== Promotion of Appalachian craft and art ==
Charles Counts was concerned that traditional crafts of Appalachia would be lost with the cultural changes devolving from migration from rural America to cities and from the mountain South to manufacturing regions of the North. In an article for the Summer 1977 edition of Appalachian Heritage Counts noted that because his mother preferred "new store bought items to home-made, rural things were a part of his inheritance, a strong force that affected him deeply but experienced indirectly." He promoted the economic benefits of producing crafts to supplement household income in depressed areas safeguarding the dignity of the craftspeople involved. Since 1956 Charles Counts was a member and supporter of the Southern Highland Craft Guild whose mission is still to keep alive the Appalachian tradition of making traditional and contemporary arts and crafts. He also worked with the Smithsonian Institution to produce a 1971 report, "Encouraging America's Handcrafts: What Role in Economic Development." published by the U. S. Department of Commerce on the possibilities that handcrafts could revitalize the economy in depressed areas of the Appalachians.

== Teaching career ==
In 1965 the Counts had received federal funding to teach ceramics to local people.that led to his joint venture with local quilters. Counts also taught workshops and classes at the University of Tennessee, Chattanooga and Dalton State College in Georgia. Counts briefly published a newsletter called the Southeastern Craftsman in 1965 and contributed to Appalachian Heritage and other art and craft magazines. By the 1980s Charles Counts was increasingly drawn to Nigeria and its craft traditions. In he began teaching at Ahmadu Bello University in Zaria, Nigeria. Eventually Counts accepted a full-time teaching position at Maiduiguru University in Nigeria only returning to the United States infrequently. In 2000 Charles Counts died from the complications of malaria in Nigeria and is buried in Oak Ridge, Tennessee.

== Honors and organizations ==
- 1965 Board of Trustees, Southern Highland Handicraft Guild
- 1967 Chairman, Georgia Arts Commission
- 1968 Chairman of the Board, Economic Opportunity Authority of Northwest Georgia
- 1968 Officer of Georgia Mountain Arts
- 1973 Georgia Governor's Award
- 1995 Fellow of the American Craft Council.

== Exhibitions ==
- High Museum of Art. Atlanta, Georgia 1971.
- "The Life and Works of CHARLES COUNTS (1934–2000)." January 16 - May 2, 2010. Folk Art Center, Asheville, NC.
