= Henrietta Pettway =

Henrietta Pettway (1894–1971) was an American artist. She is associated with the Gee's Bend quilting collective. Her work is included in the collection of the Philadelphia Museum of Art. Her surviving quilts, dating from the 1920s, demonstrate how long the improvisational method has been in use in Gee's Bend.

== Life ==
Not much is known about Henrietta Pettway's life as a young person, but her life was told through an interview with her daughter-in-law, Allie Pettway. Pettway's son, John the Baptist, married Allie Pettway in 1934 and together they raised thirteen children in Henrietta's house with her assistance. Allie and John the Baptist worked in the fields and Henrietta took care of the children, especially once she got older.

== Work ==
The classic Gee's Bend improvisational method of quilting pre-dates Henrietta's practice and is very evident in her surviving quilts. Her most common pattern was a center medallion "Log Cabin" style, locally referred to as a "Hog Pen Pole" in which a center focal point is surrounded by concentric squares or patterns.
