= Nettie Jane Kennedy =

American artist

- Born: Nettie Jane Bendolph; 1916
- Died: 2002 (aged 85–86)
- Occupation: Artist
- Known for: Quilting
- Spouse: Hargrove Kennedy (m. 1936)

Nettie Jane Kennedy (1916–2002) was an American artist associated with the Gee's Bend group of quilters.

== Early life ==
Nettie Jane Bendolph was the youngest of Indiana and Patrick Bendolph's 16 children. Being the youngest, she had no interest in or capabilities to farm alongside her older siblings. Her family primarily grew cotton, corn, peas, pinders (a local term for peanuts), millet for syrup, and raised cows and hogs.

At 20 years old, she married Hargrove Kennedy, who was named after Hargrove Van de Graaff, the owner of the Gee's Bend estate. Hargrove and Nettie Jane worked for the estate and sharecropped off of their land. They were married for more than 65 years.

== Work ==
Kennedy learned to quilt from her mother and sister, both named Indiana. She initially learned to quilt on scrap cloth, which her father brought home, and repurposed work clothes. Her work is included in the permanent collections of the Metropolitan Museum of Art and in the Museum of Fine Arts Houston.
