= Wini McQueen =

- Born: 1949 (age 75–76); Neptune Township, New Jersey
- Education: Howard University
- Known for: quilting

Wini "Akissi" McQueen (born 1943) is an American quilter based in Macon, Georgia. Her artistic production consists of hand-dyed accessories and narrative quilts. Her techniques for her well-known quilts include an image transferring process. In her work, she tackles issues of race, class, society, and women. Her quilts have featured in many museum exhibitions, including the Museum of African American Folk Art, the Taft Museum, the Bernice Steinbam Gallery, and the William College Art Museum. In 2020, her quilts were featured in a retrospective dedicated to her textile art at the Museum of Arts & Sciences in Macon, GA.

== Early life and education ==
McQueen was born in 1943 in Neptune Township, New Jersey. She grew up in Durham, North Carolina. She attended Howard University, graduating in 1968, and lived in Washington, DC.

== Works ==
McQueen's quilt Ode to Edmund is an homage to South Carolina slave Edmund G. Carlisle, who taught himself to read and write. The red, white, and blue quilt incorporates textual accounts from former slaves and daguerreotypes of slaves photographed in 1850 on a South Carolina plantation. The quilt's geometric pattern was inspired by traditional West African textiles. McQueen refers to her works as "urban kente".

McQueen frequently uses photocopy transfer panels in her quilts. Her Family Tree quilt arranges "pictorial patches in a rough cruciform cluster but maintains the integrity of the vertical and horizontal axes."

The Tubman Museum in Macon commissioned a quilt from McQueen. Her story quilt, She, was completed in 1994 and depicts the lives of women from the area dating back to the 1800s. Three of McQueens quilts are in the collection of the Museum of Arts and Sciences in Macon. In 2014, McQueen was part of a three-artist exhibition at the Macon Arts and Sciences Museum titled Quilts, Textiles, and Fibers In Macon Georgia. Other exhibitions McQueen has been a part of include Stitching Memories. African-American Story Quilts at Williams College Museum of Art in 1989 and the Baltimore Museum of Art; American Resources: Selected Works of African American Artists at Bernice Steinbaum Gallery in 1989; Ties that Bind: A TransAtlantic Journey at Blackbridge Hall Art Gallery in 2009; and Black Artists of Georgia: Selections from the Tubman Museum at the Arts Clayton Gallery in 2010. McQueen's 2015 exhibition If Walls Could Talk was featured on the opening day of Macon's Tubman Museum. It included 125 narrative panels concerning Middle Georgians and Maconites. The panels combined quilting and photo transfers with other treatments.

McQueen is an outreach teacher with the art and history program at the Tubman Museum. She has given public lectures at the Lanier Center of the Arts. McQueen was an Artist in Residence at the Georgia National Fair in 1990 and 2014.

== Awards and accolades ==
- Two-time recipient of the Georgia Council for the Arts Award.
- Lila Wallace Reader's Digest Grant, documenting the narrative traditional of textiles in the Ivory Coast. McQueen expressed the value of such experiences in an interview with Macon Magazine, "I watched the sun set behind Mount Korogo in rural northern Cote d’Ivoire while the women prepared their bobbins for spinning work the next day – that’s my real resume. That’s the meat of it.”
- Curated two large-scale exhibits – one in Macon, one in Africa – documenting crafts in African-American communities.
