= Martha Jane Pettway =

American artist (1898–2003)

Martha Jane Pettway (1898–2003) was an American artist associated with the Gee's Bend group of quilters. Pettway was born in Gee's Bend, Alabama and lived her entire life there. Her work is included in the collection of the Philadelphia Museum of Art and the Metropolitan Museum of Art.

== Life ==
Martha Jane and her husband Little Pettway were outspoken civil rights leaders in the Gee's Bend community. They were the first family to receive a Roosevelt House and persuaded other Gee's bend families to participate in New Deal public assistance projects. Little Pettway was the community liaison that spearheaded the breakup and reassignment of negligent plantation owners' lands to the families of Gee's Bend. Through the Agricultural Adjustment Administration's reassignment of land, Martha Jane and her family received 75 acres of arable swamp and dry land.

She often took her children and husband to marches in Selma during the civil rights movement.

Together Martha Jane and Little raised fifteen children – five boys and ten girls. She taught all of her daughters to quilt, which beget some famous quilters like Plummer T. Pettway and Joanna Pettway. Her daughter-in-law, Louella Pettway, was also a professional quilter.

Martha Jane lived to be 103 and spent her latter years living in Mobile, Alabama.

== Work ==
Martha Jane's quilts were a vital part of her children's comfort and warmth at home and were primarily made of repurposed work clothes. Most of her and her daughters' quilts would only last a year because they were being used so extensively by such a large family. Thus, it was important that all of her daughters learn to quilt and replenish the family's supplies. Martha Jane's son Nathan (also Louella Pettway's husband) remembers sleeping under his sisters quilts well into adulthood.
