= Sophie Tatum LaCroix =

American artist, writer (1862–1949)

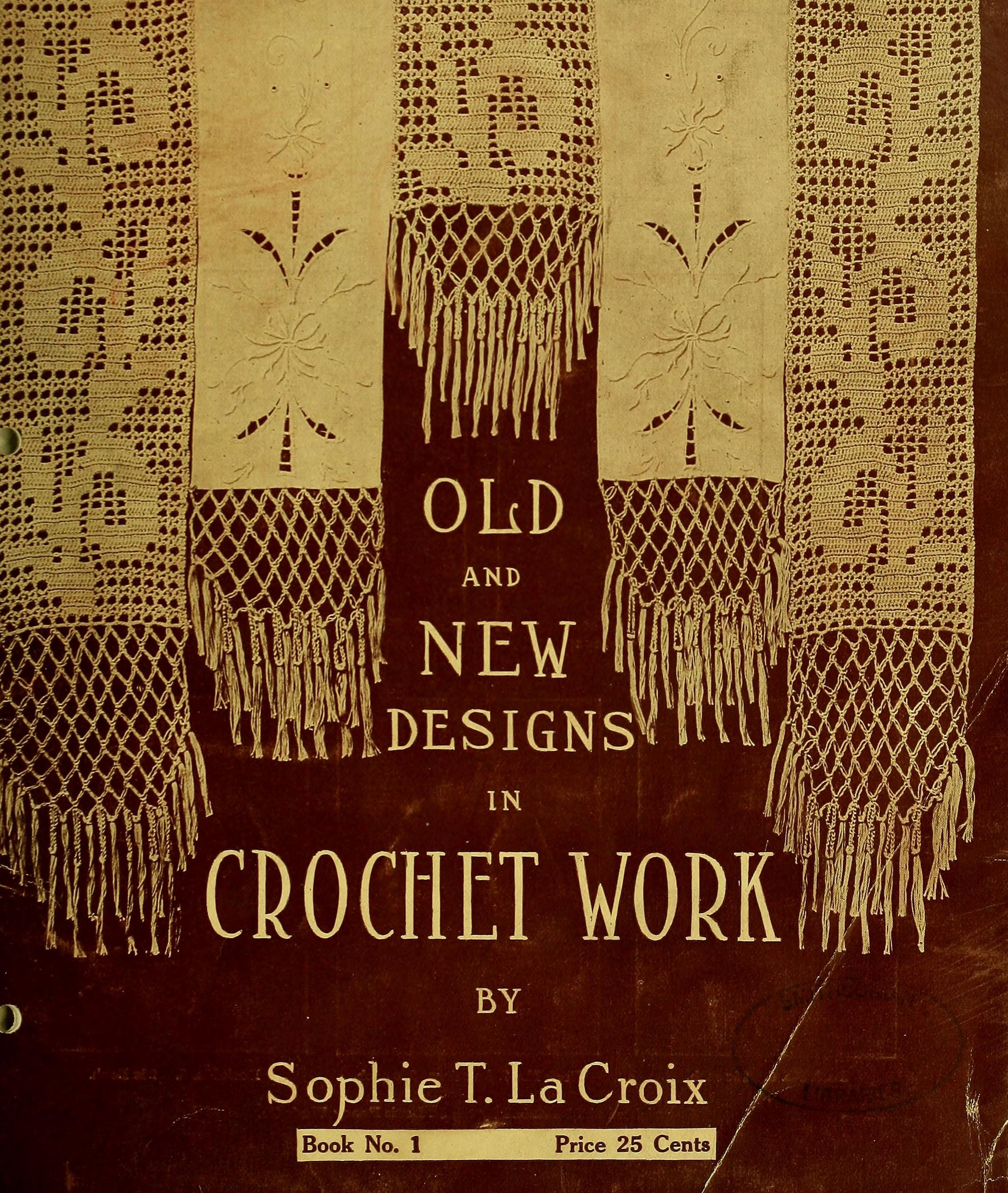
- Cover of Old and New Designs in Crochet Work (1914).
- Born: October 17, 1862; Belleville, Illinois, United States
- Died: July 16, 1949 (aged 86); St. Louis, Missouri, United States
- Known for: crochet, tatting, beadwork, quilting, needlework and embroidery
- Notable work: Old and New Designs craft series

Sophie Tatum LaCroix (October 17, 1862 – July 16, 1949) was an American handcrafts designer, editor and author of 18 books on crochet, tatting, beadwork, quilting, needlework and embroidery in the early 1900s.

== Life and family ==
Miss Sophie T. LaCroix was born in Belleville, Illinois to Rene. M. LaCroix, a Canadian merchant, and his wife Mary, née Hopkins, from Virginia. She had at least five siblings, including Susan (born c. 1845), Laura O. (born c. 1848, a teacher), Cornelia (born c. 1858, a store clerk), Estella (born c. 1860) and Maurice D. (born c. 1866, who worked in a printing office). She was the step granddaughter of John Reynolds (4th governor of Illinois) through her father, whose mother Mrs LaCroix had married Reynolds when her son was a child.

== Career ==
LaCroix was a stockholder, proprietor and instructor of St. Louis Fancy Work Co. until her retirement in 1921. She never married and died at her home at 5726 McPherson Avenue, St. Louis, Missouri from Myocarditis, a condition she had been suffering from for a number of years.

== Legacy ==
Librarian Gilbert Witte has catalogued LaCroix's Old and New Designs craft series, which was published by the St. Louis Fancy Work Co. in the early decades of the 20th century. First edition copies are now part of the collection of the Tennyson Library of Crochet & Related Arts, part of the University of Illinois Rare Books & Manuscripts Library and in the Smithsonian's collection.

Quilt historian Barbara Brackman writes that LaCroix's 1915 book of quilt patterns Martha Washington Patchwork Quilt Book 'captured the cultural confusion American needleworkers faced' and was one of the few that 'attempted a new recipe for the American melting pot'. While LaCroix's name is credited on the book's cover, the Quilt Index, a joint project of partners including the Library of Congress American Folklife Center, attribute the quilt designs to Ann Conway, also of St. Louis, with LaCroix as editor.

== Publications ==
- Old and new designs in crochet work (1914)
- Old and New Designs in Tatting and Crochet Braids (1914)
- Old and New Designs in Crochet Work 100 Christmas Novelties (1914)
- Martha Washington Patchwork Quilt Book (1915)
- Smocking: a treatise on ornamental shirring (1915)
- Old and new designs in crochet work : bedspreads ([1918?])
- Old and new designs in crochet corset covers and nightgown yokes ([19--])
- Old and new designs in crocheted towels, pillow-cases, sheets ([19--])
- Old and new designs in crochet work : yokes & collars ([19--])
- Cross-stitch Designs ([19--])
- Old and New Designs in Hardanger Embroidery ([19--])
- Old and New Designs in Tatting ([19--])
- Old and New Designs Edgings & Insertions for Towels, Pillow-cases, Sheets ([19--])
- Old and New Designs in Crocheted Centerpieces, lunch sets and alphabets ([19--])
- Old and New Designs in Crochet Seamless Yokes, Hats, Baby Yokes ([19--])
- Plain and Fancy Knitting ([19--])
- Old and New Designs in Crocheted Edges for hemstitched sheets, towels, slips, scarfs & centers; bedspread, lunch set and large table covers ([19--])
- Old and New Designs in Bead Work; sautoir chains, beaded necklaces, bags, purses, slipper buckles, watch fobs, etc. ([19--])
