= Gearldine Westbrook =

American artist (1919–2016)

Gearldine Westbrook (1919–2016) was an American artist associated with the Gee's Bend group of quilters.

== Life ==
Westbrook grew up surrounded by quiltmakers. She learned to quilt from her grandmother, her mother, and her sisters. She worked on her and her husband, Miree Westbrook's, farm most of her life. Her in-laws were Fannie and Eddie Westbrook, as well as the known quilter, Amelie Bennet. Her neighbor, Mensie Lee Pettway was another avid quilter.

Westbrook could trace her lineage back many generations through south western Alabama, including her great-grandfather, who was a Civil War soldier.

== Work ==
Westbrook's materials were a patchwork of all of her family's belongings. Some of her earliest quilts were made from her great-grandfather's overalls, relative's work-uniforms, and old socks. Preferring not to use patterns, Westbrook's improvisational style comes from determination and "sitting down and putting them together, just get me a needle and some thread and sitting down and just went to work. I was just doing the best I could. When you sit down you got to get yourself a mind of your own, figure out a way to put them together."

Her work is included in the collections of the Art Institute of Chicago and the Fine Arts Museums of San Francisco.
