= Lutisha Pettway =

American artist (1925–2001)

Lutisha Pettway (1925–2001) was an American artist associated with the Gee's Bend group of quilters.

Her work is included in the collection of the Museum of Fine Arts Houston.

== Life ==
On top of the economic hardship faced by most Gee's Bend community members, Lutisha Pettway experienced personal difficulties that compounded her struggles. Her mother died when she was very young and her father was left to take care of her and her siblings. He remarried a woman whom was not interested in tending to his children, so most of the domestic responsibilities fell on Lutisha.

Pettway never married. She farmed alongside her father until members of the Rentz Realty & Investments agency seized her father's land. After that, Lutisha moved to Mobile, Alabama where she worked as a domestic attendant for white families. This substantial increase in pay allowed here to send money to her father in Gee's Bend to counter child care costs for her nine children, including her son with Down Syndrome. She worked in Mobile for six and a half years, and she returned to Gee's Bend when her father fell ill. After he died, he left his land to Lutisha's brother Yancy.

Lutisha died in 2001 at 76 years old.

== Work ==
Fluent in many textile arts, Lutisha was a learned quilter, knitter, and weaver. She learned to weave cloth at school and taught herself to quilt and knit. Her quilts were a necessity to keep her children warm during the winter and were mostly made of repurposed work clothes. She relied on the sewing machine to piece her quilts when she developed arthritis, but she did most of her work by hand before that.
