= Mertlene Perkins =

American artist (1917–2015)

Mertlene Perkins (1917–2015) was an American artist. She is associated with the Gee's Bend quilting collective. Her work has been exhibited at the Museum of Fine Arts, Houston and is included in the collection of the Metropolitan Museum of Art.

== Early life ==
Perkins' mother and father were Maggie Tripp and Isom Martin, respectively. Her mother was a farmer and her father worked on the railroad. She loved being with her mother, so she began to help on the farm the earliest that she could, around eight years old. They mostly raised cotton, corn peanuts, and potatoes.

She attended school for nine years in Prairie, Alabama She married Herman Perkins when she was nineteen. They raised twelve children together, nine of which survived to adulthood.

== Work ==
Perkins learned to quilt from her mother and grandmother. Quilting was a source of enjoyment for Perkins. Following the tradition of Gee's Bend improvisation style, she remarks that "I just make up my own quilts. I really don't follow nobody's ideas but mine."
