= Ellen Morton Littlejohn =

Ellen Morton Littlejohn (c. 1826 - 1899) was an enslaved African-American quilt maker.

== Life ==
Littlejohn was enslaved by Marmaduke Beckwith Morton, who owned an estate called "The Knob" in Russellville, Kentucky. Her mother, "Aunt Eve", had raised Morton and eleven of his siblings, before he went on to own Eve and her daughters, Ellen and Margaret. Littlejohn was known as "Aunt Ellen" during her life. Contemporary accounts praise Littlejohn's ability as a seamstress.

After slavery was abolished, Littlejohn remained at Morton's estate, where she lived and worked until his death in 1887.

== Works ==
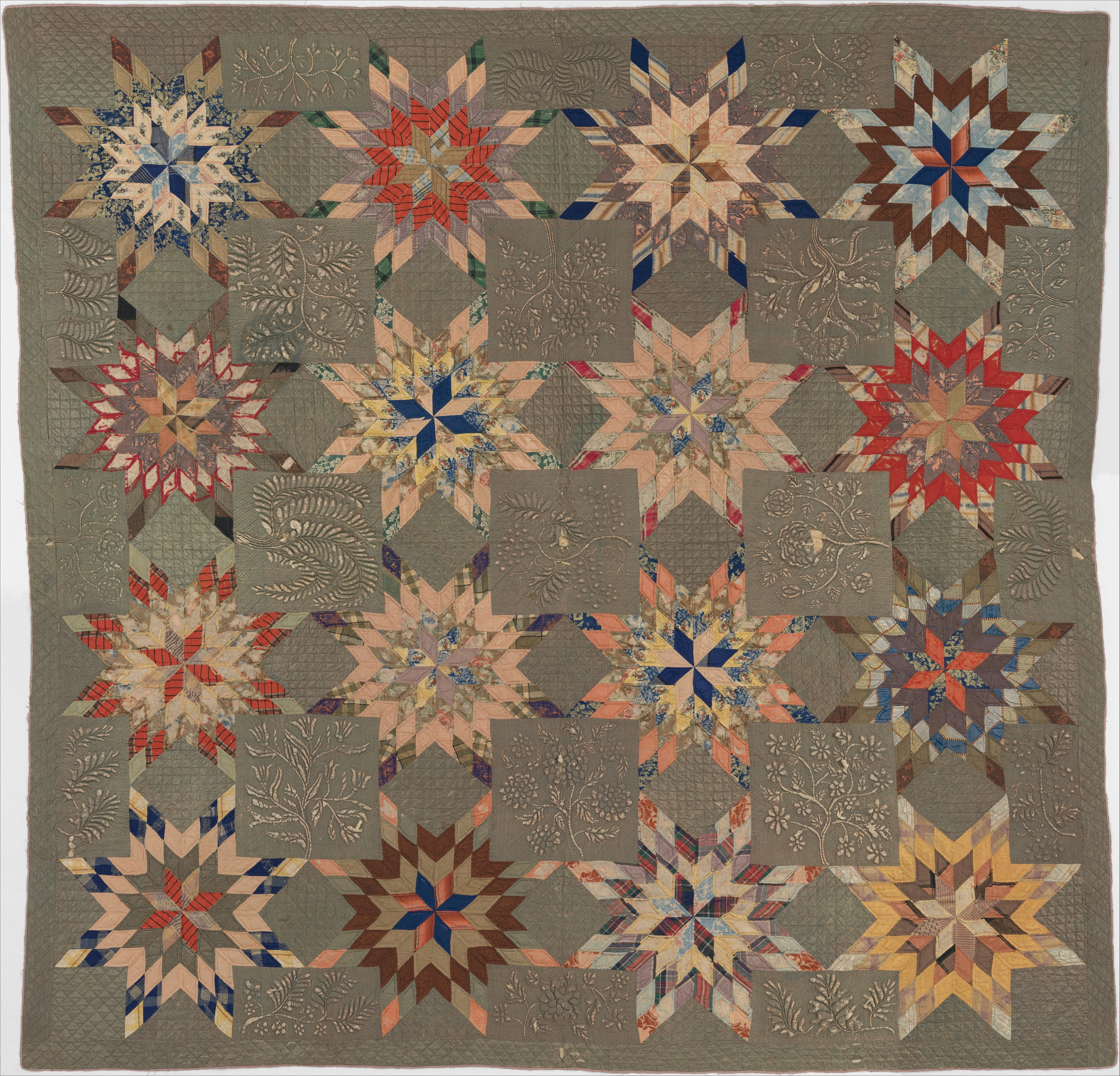
Littlejohn's Star of Bethlehem quilt (c. 1837–1850)

One of Littlejohn's quilts, which she made with her sister, Margaret Morton Bibb, and which uses a variation of the Star of Bethlehem design, is housed at the Metropolitan Museum of Art. It originally was made for Elizabeth Caldwell Morton, Marmaduke's wife, and was used in one of the bedrooms of the Morton's estate.

Another quilt attributed to Littlejohn and Bibb, “Whig Rose and Swag Border Quilt,” was also made for Elizabeth Morton, and is now housed at the Amon Carter Museum of American Art. It was made around 1850. Scholars think the "Whig roses" design was a nod to the Whig Party, with which the Morton family was affiliated. For many years, the quilt had been attributed to Elizabeth, but examination of the quilt's back revealed a note which attributed the quilt's creation to enslaved women in the household.
