= Clarissa Knighten =

American jewelry artist

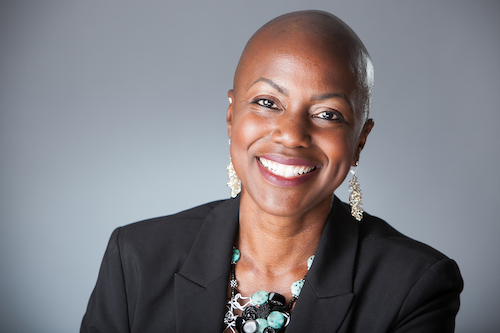
Photo Portrait of Artist Clarissa Knighten by Maksim Stepanov 2017

Clarissa Knighten is a designer in Kansas City, MO specializing in wearable art. Her designs and jewelry include both commercial and bold expressive pieces for fashion show runway and gallery exhibitions. She calls her work "sculptural art" finding her direction in natural elements such as shells, bone, and driftwood in combination with stones and manmade elements like buttons, bike chain, and leather. The foundational inspiration for her work is a combination of nature and American roots. The repurposing of objects and the use of bold textures with crocheted wires and natural items create a stunning effect.

== Background ==
Clarissa Knighten's family traveled all over the country when she was young because her father was a Chief Master Sergeant in the Air Force, as reported in the Kansas City Star. Knighten left Corporate America in 2017 after nearly twenty years in marketing to become the CEO of Rissa’s Artistic Design, and a commercial model. Knighten started working full time as a professional artist participating in her first Kansas City fashion week in 2018. She is a member of the African American Artists Collective KC. She founded Rissa’s Artistic Design in 2007 as a way to navigate mental health. Part of Knighten’s purpose behind R.A.D. is to help people understand that they can use life’s challenges to do something positive and impactful. In an interview with Michael Mackie she explains, "Her wares run the gamut from 'earthy to edgy to elegant...Take one look and you’ll spy her jewelry has a voice and an expressive story of resilience. 'I would like to help people understand jewelry is art and in every form heals,' Knighten says." In 2019, Knighten was the closing collection in the West 18th Street Fashion Show, and was one of four designers invited to return to the 20th Anniversary Show, which was captured in the documentary film Summer in Hindsight – Directors Cut.

== Recognition & Speaking Engagements ==
- First Place, Jewelry, Mid-Winter Artist Fair Kansas City, MO Feb 2018, 2020
- Designer with Kansas City Fashion Week, Kansas City, MO 2018-2020
- Fashion Week Featured Artist, Omaha, NE 2020.
- Charlotte Street Residency with the African American Artists Collective, KC MO 2018
- InterUrban ArtHouse ArtWorks Artist Profile Overland Park, KS Aug 2020
- Guild It & Global Entrepreneur Week – Chat with the Artist, KC, MO Nov 2019
- KCUR-FM 89.3 NPR Kansas City – Clarissa Knighten, Artist KC, MO 2019
