= Lucy P. Pettway =

American quilter (1930–2003)

Lucy P. Pettway (1930–2003) was an American quilter. She is associated with the Gee's Bend quilting collective. Pettway's quilt titled Housetop - Nine-Block Half-Log Cabin Variation, is the permanent collection of the National Gallery of Art.

== Early life and education ==
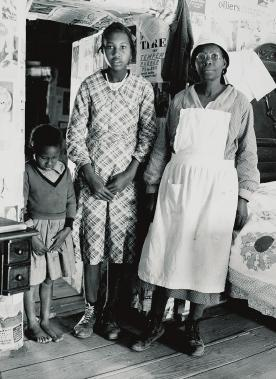
Lucy P. Pettway (left), her sister Bertha Pettway, and their grandmother Lucy Mooney, 1937.

Pettway was born to Nelson and Catherine Mooney Pettway. Her mother died when she was four years old after which she went to live with her grandparents, Needom and Lucy Mooney.

Pettway and her grandparents lived in Alabama. They moved from Primrose to Rehobeth and lastly to Gee's Bend where Pettway's grandmother was a cook at the Pettway Plantation house.

Pettway attended Pleasant Grove Missionary Baptist Church and earned a degree from Alabama State University.

== Quilting ==
Pettway was a quilter and was part of the Gee's Bend quilting collective.

== Collections ==
- National Gallery of Art: Washington DC

== Exhibitions ==
- Called to Create: Black Artists of the American South - National Gallery of Art: 2022

== Personal life ==
Pettway and her husband, Willie Quill Pettway, had five children.
