= Bryony Dalefield =

New Zealand photographer and visual artist

Bryony Dalefield (born 1951) is a New Zealand photographer and visual artist based in Wales. Her photographs are held in the collections of the Auckland Art Gallery Toi o Tāmaki and the Museum of New Zealand Te Papa Tongarewa.

== Early life ==
Dalefield was born in 1951 in Palmerston North, New Zealand, and grew up on a farm in the Manawatū region. In 1976, she travelled to the United Kingdom to work. During the 1990s she lived and worked in the village of Wye on the English-Welsh border.

== Education ==
Dalefield studied photography at the Elam School of Fine Arts in Auckland.

== Career ==
After graduating from Elam, Dalefield worked as a photographer in New Zealand. Her photographs were featured in New Art: Some Recent New Zealand Sculpture and Post-Object Art, edited by Jim Allen and Wystan Curnow in 1976.

She began making quilts around 1979 after seeing an exhibition in the UK in which quilting was presented as an artistic medium. Her quilts have included motifs such as eyes, hands, scissors and trees, along with Māori-inspired designs. Regarding works presented in her solo exhibition Provided with Eyes, she said that her quilting

has taken me to various countries and through stages in my life. I think they reflect that, to me they a story about a journey. [...] What I like is the size. Quilting is done on a larger scale and designed to be wrapped around the body. All my work is larger than me.

Dalefield works mainly with tartans (a nod to her Scottish ancestry), chintz, calico and glazed cotton, fabrics that are all prone to fading. She describes herself as a quilter "greedy for pattern".

Notable exhibitions:

- No Man's Land: Extending the Boundaries of Women and Art in Aotearoa at Dowse Art Museum, Lower Hutt, 1993. This exhibition, curated by Laurence Hall, celebrated the centennial of Women's suffrage in New Zealand, and featured work from 47 artists known for their innovations in craft and materials. Dalefield presented a work titled Do we stand on their shoulders or do they ride on ours?
- Provided with Eyes at Dowse Art Museum, Lower Hutt, 1994. For this exhibition, Dalefield brought to New Zealand a collection of 33 quilts from an exhibition that had first shown at the Glynn Vivian Art Gallery in Swansea, Wales. The exhibition was then shown at other galleries around New Zealand (including Auckland Museum) before heading back to the UK for a national tour. Dalefield wrote a text to accompany the exhibition, also titled Provided with Eyes.
- Contact at Michael Lett Gallery, 2013. This exhibition presented fifty black and white photographs by Dalefield, documenting the 1974 performance of Jim Allen's work Contact at the Auckland Art Gallery Toi o Tāmaki.
- Cusp at Ruthin Craft Centre, Denbighshire, 2017. This group exhibition presented works from seven Welsh artists whose works mingle art and craft. Other artists included Claire Curneen, Paul Emmanuel, Nigel Hurlstone, Christine Mills, Beth Elen Roberts and Sean Vicary.

Written works:

- Provided with Eyes (1994), a work written and designed to accompany the exhibition of quilts of the same name. ISBN 978-0-903189-53-8.
