= Sonié Joi Thompson-Ruffin =

American artist and community organizer (born 1952)

Sonié Joi Thompson-Ruffin (born 1951 in Joplin, Missouri) is an American fiber artist, author, designer, community organizer, and curator. Ruffin creates quilts using fabric, symbolism, and references to African textile motifs that explore issues dealing with human rights, race, and gender. Her work has been exhibited across the United States, Africa, and Europe, at the Renwick Gallery of the Smithsonian American Art Museum, the White House Rotunda, and the Nelson-Atkins Museum of Art. She has been a resident artist at the Charlotte Street Foundation and a resident curator at the American Jazz Museum. Thompson-Ruffin is one of the founding members of the African American Artists Collective, a group of African American artists in Kansas City. Thompson-Ruffin was selected to create the Nelson Mandela memorial coverlet by the South African Consulate and the Grace and Holy Trinity Cathedral. Her work is held in collections such as the Spencer Museum of Art in Lawrence, Kansas, and others. Her work has been featured on the front covers of New Letters literary journal and of KC Studio Magazine.
