= Margaret Morton Bibb =

American artist (1832–c. 1900)

Margaret Morton Bibb (c. 1832 - 1900/1910) was an enslaved African-American quilt maker.

== Life ==
Bibb was enslaved by Marmaduke Beckwith Morton, who owned an estate called "The Knob" in Russellville, Kentucky. Her mother, "Aunt Eve", had raised Morton and eleven of his siblings, before he went on to own Eve and her daughters, Margaret and Ellen. Bibb was known as "Aunt Margaret" during her life, and acted as the family cook for many years.

== Works ==
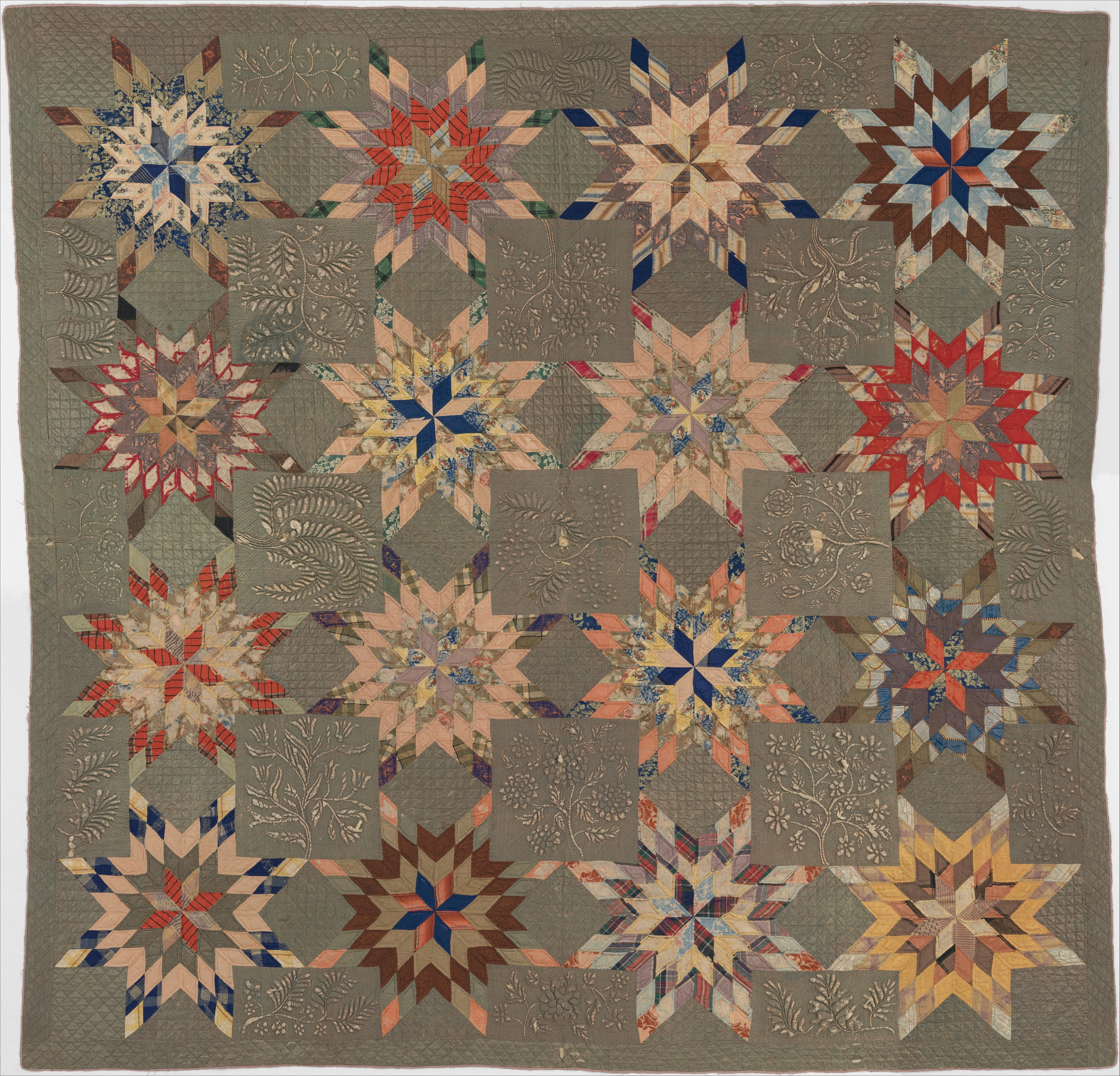
Bibb's Star of Bethlehem quilt (c. 1837–1850)

One of Bibb's quilts, which she made with her sister, Ellen Morton Littlejohn, and which uses a variation of the Star of Bethlehem design, is housed at the Metropolitan Museum of Art. It originally was made for Elizabeth Caldwell Morton, Marmaduke's wife, and was used in one of the bedrooms of the Morton's estate.

Another quilt attributed to Bibb and Littlejohn, “Whig Rose and Swag Border Quilt,” was also made for Elizabeth Morton, and is now housed at the Amon Carter Museum of American Art. It was made around 1850. Scholars think the "Whig roses" design was a nod to the Whig Party, with which the Morton family was affiliated. For many years, the quilt had been attributed to Elizabeth, but examination of the quilt's back revealed a note which attributed the quilt's creation to enslaved women in the household.
