= C&T Publishing =

Book publisher based in Concorde, US

- Founded: 1983
- Founder: Carolie and Tom Hensley
- Country of origin: United States
- Headquarters location: Concord, California
- Distribution: Simon & Schuster (USA); Search Press (UK)
- Publication types: Books
- Nonfiction topics: quilting, sewing, and crafting
- Imprints: Stash Books, Kansas City Star Quilts, FunStitch Studio
- Official website: www.ctpub.com

C&T Publishing is a midsize, family-run, independent publisher of quilting, sewing, and crafting books based in Concord, CA. It was founded in 1983 by Carolie and Tom Hensley, owners of The Cotton Patch, a quilting and sewing supplies store in Lafayette, CA. Roberta Horton, a friend of Carolie's, wanted to publish a book on Amish-inspired quilting, so Carolie and Tom raised money from friends and followed do-it-yourself advice from a library book to publish their very first book, An Amish Adventure. The first edition sold 90,000 copies. The business grew from there, and Carolie and Tom's sons, Todd and Tony Hensley, purchased it from their parents in 1990. Since then, C&T has introduced two new imprints: Stash Books and FunStitch Studio, as well as a website, Patternspot.com, where quilt patterns can be posted and purchased directly by consumers. C&T Publishing has also made efforts to become more environmentally friendly, becoming a certified Bay Area Green Business especially in light of the trend for green quilting projects. In Summer 2015, C&T also acquired Kansas City Star Quilts. Authors published with C&T include Barbara Brackman, Yvonne Porcella, and Michael James. C&T Publishing books are distributed in the book trade by Simon & Schuster and in the UK by Search Press (since 2014).

== Stash Books ==
The 2010 launch of this imprint, which publishes handmade fabric arts books at lower price points than C&T's other books, signaled C&T's new focus on the book trade (the company had previously sold mainly to quilt stores and craft chains and through craft distributors). The books have minimalistic aesthetic with a lot of white space and set-shot photography. Publishers Weekly called the launch "a key factor in driving up sales" for C&T Publishing, leading to a 47% increase in sales in 2010. 10 of the books published in 2010 under Stash Books were reprinted within the following year. As of 2014, Stash Books made up about half of the publisher's catalogue. One of the books from this imprint, Sew Adorkable by Samarra Khaja, won the Gold in the Craft Book category in the PubWest Book Design Awards in 2016.

== FunStitch Studio ==
The success of the Stash Books imprint led to the creation of FunStitch Studio, an imprint aimed at kids ages 8–14, in 2013. This imprint released 12 titles within its first year, and C&T Publishing's best-selling book of 2013, We Love to Sew, by Annabel Wrigley came from this imprint. The imprint then released 10 titles in 2014. Due to the success of this imprint and Stash Books, C&T Publishing was named one of Publishers Weekly's 11 Fast-Growing Independent Publishers for 2013. Two of the books from this imprint, The Amazing Stitching Handbook for Kids by Kristin Nicholas and Girl's Guide to DIY Fashion by Rachel Low, won the Silver and Gold respectively in the Craft Book category in the PubWest Book Design Awards in 2016.

== Kansas City Star Quilts ==
C&T Publishing acquired Kansas City Star Quilts, a small publishing company based in Kansas City, on July 10, 2015. This deal also included the two imprints of Kansas City Star Quilts, My Stars and Star Stitch.

== Other Products ==
All new C&T titles launch simultaneously in print and ebook format, and many out-of-print titles have been released as ebooks. The company saw a 100% increase in ebook sales in 2010 and ebook sales nearly doubled in 2013.

The company also has print-on-demand program for out-of-print books, which it began in mid-2009. The success of this program–it saw a nearly 1000% increase in sales in 2010–was one of the factors contributing to C&T Publishing being named one of Publishers Weekly’s fastest-growing independent publishers in 2013.

In the digital realm, C&T Publishing operates Patternspot.com, a site “that allows users to upload and sell their own quiltmaking and craft sewing design patterns,” Patternspot.com was launched in August 2011. The company receives a portion of the revenue from each sale, and the site also allows the publisher to monitor upcoming trends.

Beginning in 2009, C&T has also released mobile apps through the iTunes App Store, mostly content from its books and DVDs reformatted and packaged for mobile devices.

Aside from its books and digital-based enterprises, the company also has products, including kraft•tex, a specialty paper made to look and feel like leather, and gifts, including postcards, notebooks, journals, calendars, and bags.
