= Lucy T. Pettway =

American artist (1921–2004)

Lucy T. Pettway (1921–2004) was an American artist. She is associated with the Gee's Bend quilting collective. Her work has been exhibited at the Museum of Fine Arts, Houston and the Frist Art Museum, and is included in the collection of the Metropolitan Museum of Art.

== Life ==
Lucy T. Pettway was the fourth of 14 children born to Mary Ann and Tom O. Pettway. She farmed on her family's property and spent the rest of her life primarily farming and quilting. Her family's farm harvested common crops like cotton, corn, peas, peanuts, sugarcane, and millet (sorghum). Much like her father's assistant, Lucy was a reliable farmhand, doing work like plowing that the other girls were not allowed to do.

Her schooling was augmented by the harvesting seasons. She typically went to school between the very end of November and the beginning of March. She stopped attending school at the age of twenty because by then she was already married, with one child, and had only progressed to the fifth grade. In Gee's Bend, however, this was normal and she recalled many people older than her in her final fifth grade class.

Wilcox County built a dam near Miller's Ferry, which flooded her family's 10 acres, thus destroying their farm. After that, Lucy spent most of her time piecing quilts.

== Work ==
Lucy began making quilts under her mother's and aunts' instruction when she was twelve years old. The first quilt she completed was in the locally named "Lazy Gal" style, which consisted of long strips sewn vertically. The second style she created was a "Nine Patch," which is nine separately designed quilt rectangles pieced together. Initially, like most young quilters, her primary material was repurposed clothing.

Lucy T.'s Great-Aunt Lucy worked for a white employer in Camden, Alabama. They gave her a quilting book which contained numerous, detailed patterns. From this book, Lucy T. learned patterns rarely seen in other Gee's Bend quilts, such as "Stars," "Monkey Wrench," "Snowball," etc. Her oeuvre in the Souls Grown Deep Foundation collection is incredibly diverse, boasting more than 10 different pattern types in a 14 quilt collection.

Never one to idle, Lucy brought material to piece and quilt into the fields with her if she ever had spare time. She always made new blocks and patterns during her lunch breaks. She did not stop quilting until her mid-70's when she developed high blood pressure, which made it incredibly hard for her to focus on her patterns. She described her "head swimming" from her illness. Lucy died at the age of 83.

Many of Lucy T.'s neighbors in the Gee's Bend quilting community were impressed by the displays and ranges of Lucy T.'s quilts that hung on her clothesline, a method the local quilters used to exhibit their works.
