= Arlonzia Pettway =

American artist (1923–2008)

Arlonzia Pettway (1923–2008) was an American artist associated with the Gee's Bend group of quilters. She began quilting at age 13.

In 2006, her quilt "Chinese Coins" variation appeared on a US Postal service stamp as part of a series commemorating Gee's Bend quilters. Her work is included in the collection of the Museum of Fine Arts, Houston and the High Museum of Art in Atlanta, Georgia.

== Life ==
Arlonzia Pettway was raised on the Pettway Plantation by her father and mother until 1941, when her father died. At 18, she and her brother Ike took over the responsibilities of the farm after their father's death. They primarily raised cotton, corn, peas, and sweet potatoes. Later, they also raised cucumbers and turnips for a company in Montgomery, Alabama. In 1940, Pettway's childhood log-cabin style home was replaced with a "project house" by the federal government. It included three bedrooms, a kitchen, dining room, and two bathrooms with no running water. The family did not get indoor plumbing until 1974, nor electricity until 1964. They bought their first telephone in 1976.

Pettway married Jennie Pettway's son, Bizzell, when she was 20 years old. They farmed and raised twelve children together – four girls and eight boys – in Pettway's family home. Her husband died in 1964 and she died in 2008.

== Work ==
Considering herself a resourceful person, Pettway made most of her things herself. She believed her skills were inherent, saying: "I just had a head for doing anything. It was just born in me to make things." She recalled making, beds, bookshelves, TV cabinets and planters out of river buoys. When she was nine years old, she made dresses for her and her sister out of blue taffeta, which were the pride of her mother. Her mother likely taught her to sew and quilt before the age of nine.
