= Andrea Williams (quilter) =

American artist (born 1973)

Andrea Pettway Williams (born 1973) is an American artist. She is associated with the Gee's Bend quilting collective, along with her mother, Lorraine Pettway. Her work has been exhibited at the Museum of Fine Arts, Houston, and is included in the collection of the Philadelphia Museum of Art. She is a sixth-generation quilter.

== Exhibitions ==
Williams's work has been featured in exhibitions examining the history and contemporary significance of quilting in American art. Her work was included in Stitching the Revolution: Quilts as Agents of Change, an exhibition organized by the Mattatuck Museum that explored quilting as a medium for social and cultural change.
