= Missouri Pettway =

American artist

- Born: 1902
- Died: 1981
- Known for: Quilting
- Movement: Gee's Bend Collective

Missouri Pettway (1902-1981) was an American artist. She is associated with the Gee's Bend quilting collective. In 2002, she was heavily featured in The Quilts of Gee's Bend, an art book published in association with The Museum of Fine Arts, Houston. In 2020, the National Gallery of Art acquired two of Missouri Pettway's quilts, along with work by other quilters from Gee's Bend.

Before this 2020 acquisition, her 1942 work titled "Blocks and Strips Work-Clothes Quilt" had previously been featured in a 2016 exhibition by The New Museum of Contemporary Art, The Keeper. This piece was created shortly after the death of her beloved husband, Nathaniel, after his nearly year-long battle with a terminal illness. This utility quilt was stitched from pieces of her late husband's work clothes as a comforting way for her to honor his memory.

Her 1971 work titled "Path through the Woods" (Quiltmaker's Name) was featured in the Gallery's 2022 exhibition, Called to Create: Black Artist of the American South, September 18, 2022 – March 26, 2023, curated by Harry Cooper.
