= Louella Pettway =

American artist (1921–2006)

Louella Pettway (1921–2006), also known as Luella Pettway, was an American artist. She is associated with the Gee's Bend quilting collective and the Freedom Quilting Bee. Her work has been exhibited at the Museum of Fine Arts, Houston and is included in the collection of the Columbus Museum.

== Life ==
Louella Pettway was the youngest child of one son and six daughters born to Elizabeth and Sim Carson. She and her siblings raised crops typical of Gee's Bend farms: cotton, corn, sweet potatoes, peanuts, and peas. She went to school until the first grade. Her mother passed when she was still young and her father raised her and most of his grandchildren by himself.

== Work ==
Louella did not grow up making quilts, though she learned to sew from her mother, who made all of her children's clothing. Louella began quilting after she married, and made quilts consistently until she developed arthritis. She recalls making quilts and giving them away; she made them for enjoyment as well as utility.
