= Barbara Brackman =

American art historian (born 1945)

Barbara Brackman (born July 6, 1945) is a quilter, quilt historian and author.

Barbara has written numerous books on quilting during the Civil War including Facts & Fabrications: Unraveling the History of Quilts and Slavery, Barbara Brackman's Civil War Sampler, Barbara Brackman's Encyclopedia of Appliqué, America's Printed Fabrics 1770-1890, Civil War Women, Clues in the Calico, Emporia Rose Appliqué Quilts, Making History–Quilts & Fabric from 1890-1970, and Quilts from the Civil War, all published by C&T Publishing. Her Encyclopedia of Pieced Quilt Patterns contains more than 4000 pieced quilt patterns, derived from printed sources published between 1830 and 1970.

She also wrote articles for Quilter's Newsletter starting in 1975, when she met Bonnie Leman in Denver.

She was inducted into the Quilters Hall of Fame of Marion, Indiana in 2001.

== Works ==
- Patterns of Progress: Quilts in the Machine Age, Autry Museum of Western Heritage, 1997, ISBN 9781882880034
- Quilts from the Civil War. C&T Publishing. 1997. ISBN 978-1-57120-033-4.
- Prairie Flower: A Year on the Plains. Kansas City Star Books. 2001. ISBN 978-0-9712920-0-0.
- Women of Design: Quilts in the Newspaper. Kansas City Star Books. January 1, 2004. ISBN 978-0-9746012-9-8.
- America's Printed Fabrics 1770-1890. C&T Publishing. 2004. ISBN 978-1-57120-255-0.
- Making History–Quilts & Fabric from 1890-1970. C&T Publishing. 2008. ISBN 978-1-57120-453-0.
- Clues in the Calico. C&T Publishing. 2009. ISBN 978-1-57120-918-4.
- Facts & Fabrications-Unraveling the History of Quilts & Slavery: 8 Projects - 20 Blocks - First-Person Accounts. C&T Publishing Inc. November 5, 2010. ISBN 978-1-60705-386-6.
- Civil War Women: Their Quilts Their Role. C&T Publishing Inc. November 5, 2010. ISBN 978-1-57120-809-5.
- Barbara Brackman (November 5, 2010). Barbara Brackman's Encyclopedia Of Applique: 2000 Traditional and Modern Designs, Updated History of Applique, New! 5 Quilt Projects. C&T Publishing Inc. ISBN 978-1-60705-100-8.
- Barbara Brackman's Civil War Sampler: 50 Quilt Blocks with Stories from History. C&T Publishing Inc. December 1, 2012. ISBN 978-1-60705-567-9.
- Emporia Rose Appliqué Quilts. C&T Publishing. 2014. ISBN 978-1-60705-890-8.
