= Qunnie Pettway =

American artist (1943–2010)

Qunnie Pettway (1943–2010) was an American artist associated with the Gee's Bend group of quilters and who worked for the Freedom Quilting Bee. Her mother, Candis Pettway, taught her to quilt, and she passed the skill on to her daughter Loretta Pettway Bennett. She specialized in creating traditional quilt patterns out of scraps she brought home from the Bee.

== Life ==
Pettway was surrounded by dedicated quilt-makers throughout her life. Her mother, Candis Pettway, and her sister were her first mentors. Later, she learned classic patterns at Estelle Witherspoon's house, where up to 20 women would quilt together.

She later developed diabetes, and as her eyesight began to fail, she only made quilts from simple patterns. She died in 2010.

== Work ==
Recognized for her innovation, Pettway's style is marked by her improvisational versions of traditional patterns. Her favorite method was the "Crazy Z" quilt, composed of corduroy from the Freedom Quilting Bee.
