= Delia Bennett =

American artist (1892–1976)

Delia Bennett

Delia Bennet (1892–1976) was an American artist. She is associated with the Gee's Bend quilting collective, and is said to be "the matriarch of perhaps the largest family of quilt producers in Gee's Bend. Her work is included in the collection of the Philadelphia Museum of Art.

== Early life ==
Born in 1892 to S.S. Pettway and Pleasant Pettway, Delia Bennett was raised on the Brown plantation in Gee's Bend, Alabama. She married Eddie Bennett, and they raised seven girls and four boys together. Bennett and her husband were subsistence farmers, growing food in their backyard. They were forced to grow cotton for free in exchange for living on the plantation grounds, which were owned by the Spurlin family in Camden, Alabama.

== Exhibitions ==
- 2019 - Souls Grown Deep: Artists of the African American South, Philadelphia Museum of Art
