= Flora Moore =

American artist

Flora Moore (born 1951) is an American artist associated with the Gee's Bend group of quilters.

Her work is included in the collection of the High Museum and the National Gallery of Art.

== Early life ==
Moore was born in Rehobeth, Alabama to Isaac James and Creola Young. Growing up, her main responsibilities were to harvest cotton and attend school. She worked on the farm "until [she] got big enough to know what it was about, and then [she] didn’t want to do that no more." Her education was disrupted during desegregation when the Gee's Bend High School was shut down in order for integration with Wilcox County schools. She finished the eleventh grade.

== Work ==
She used to do yard work for her cousin Estelle Witherspoon, a pillar of Gee's Bend's quilting community. In fact, seeing the quilts hanging in Witherspoon's yard, an early gathering place for quilters before the Freedom Quilting Bee collective started, was what inspired Moore to learn to quilt as a teenager. She began quilting under the instruction of Witherspoon and her aunt Ma Willie Abrams. Despite their mentorship, Moore still describes her work and patterns as following her own internal compass. The free-form, improvised quilting style is iconic of Gee's Bend artists. Moore describes her methods and artistic practices in an interview with The Souls Grown Deep Foundation:

"Sometimes you sit down and be thinking you going to put it this way, according to how you feel about it. You might know how somebody else do it, but you tell yourself, I’m going to do it different. When you sit, you don’t know how it going to come out, and you don’t think it will come out like that. I made that quilt out of corduroy. I just put it my way; I didn’t put it the way the pattern went."

Moore often made her work from sturdier materials such as corduroy and clothes donated to the quilting bee.

Moore's quilt Medallion was featured in the National Gallery of Art's special exhibition Called to Create: Black Artists of the American South, which opened on September 18, 2022.
