= Bettie Bendolph Seltzer =

American artist (1939–2017)

Bettie Bendolph Seltzer (1939–2017) was an American artist. She was associated with the Gee's Bend quilting collective, along with her mother, Annie Bendolph, and her mother-in-law, Sue Willie Seltzer. She worked at the Freedom Quilting Bee.

== Life ==
Bettie was married to the son of Sue Willie Seltzer, Benjamin Seltzer. She was the postmaster for Boykin, Alabama, a job which she loved. Efficient and timely, Bettie describes her leadership within the post office:

"It ain't easy but I love the job. I work six hours a day every day except Sunday. They come in there, get the mail, and go. Don't nobody stand around and gossip. When I'm in the post office, wearing that postal uniform, I'm postmaster. They don't look at me like I'm Bettie. I might see my best friend run in there, get the mail, and out. They don't chat. I like it like that."

== Work ==
Quilting in Gee's Bend was both a means for survival and community bonding. Bettie's mother, Annie Bendolph, taught Bettie to make quilts out of old clothes, fertilizer sacks, dress tails, and meal and flour sacks. Bettie learned to make quilts at about ten years old, when she and her mother would join other women at each other's houses to sew just one or two families' quilts at one time. "The ladies then piece their quilts at home and go to each other house to help quilt."

For the first time, The Freedom Quilting Bee allowed women in Gee's Bend to sew with new cloth. After the bee, Bettie never returned to repurposed material because it was too difficult to sew.
