= Bendolph =

Bendolph may refer to:

- Annie Bendolph (1900–1981), American artist and quilter
- Louisiana Bendolph (born 1960), American visual artist and quilt maker
- Mary Lee Bendolph (born 1935), American quilt maker
