= Nell Hall Williams =

American textile artist (1933–2021)

- Born: February 14, 1933; Near Gee's Bend (now Boykin), Alabama
- Died: December 26, 2021 (aged 88)
- Known for: Quilting
- Movement: Gee's Bend quilters
- Children: Doris Mooney

Nell Hall Williams (February 14, 1933 – December 26, 2021) was an American artist associated with the Gee's Bend group of quilters. Her work is included in the collection of the Virginia Museum of Fine Arts and the Baltimore Museum of Art.

== Biography ==
Nell Hall Williams was born on February 14, 1933, near Gee's Bend (Boykin), Alabama. Her mother, Pearlie Hall, was raised in Gee's Bend.

Williams began making quilts with her mother as a child, and once recalled helping her until "nine or ten at night." Many of her early quilts were made from leftover and used fabrics, including bleached flour sacks and discarded clothing. She lost most of these quilts in a house fire in her adulthood.

Williams had a daughter, Doris Mooney.

She died on December 26, 2021.

== Works ==
- Stacked Bricks (c. 1955; also known as Stacked Bricks in columns with borders on two sides) – This quilt is made of silk garment linings and is one of the only quilts that survived the house fire.
- Medallion of Blocks and Strips (1960s)
- Pattern to Joseph's Coat (c. late 1960s) – Piecing for this quilt was done by Nell Hall Williams and Lucy Mingo. It was quilted by Ella Mae Irby, Doll James, and Sam Square.
- Blocks and Strips (1971)
- Housetop (1990s)
- My Way (undated)
- Stacked Bricks (undated)
