= FQB =

FQB may refer to:

- Freedom Quilting Bee, quilting cooperative in Alabama, United States
- FQB, station code for Faqirabad railway station, Pakistan
- FQB, French Universal Dependencies syntactic treebank dataset
