= Anne Young =

Anne Young may refer to:

- Anne B. Young, American physician and neurologist
- Ann Eliza Young (1844–1917), polygamist
- Anne Sewell Young (1871–1961), American astronomer
- Anne Young (academic), professor of biomaterials
- Anne Young (nurse) (1907–1976), Irish nurse
- Anne Young (rugby union) (born 2000), Scottish rugby union player
- Anne Gunn (1756 – c. 1813), née Young, Scottish music teacher and inventor

== See also ==
- Annie Young (died 2018), American politician
- Annie Mae Young (1928–2013), American artist
- Annie Young-Scrivner, Chinese-American business executive
- Anna Irwin Young (1873–1920), American professor of mathematics, physics and astronomy
- Anna Young Smith (1756–1780), née Young, American poet
