= Mary Lee Bendolph =

American quilt maker (born 1935)

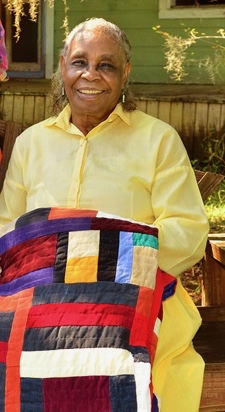
- Bendolph in 2015
- Born: 1935 (age 90–91); Boykin, Alabama, U.S.
- Known for: Quilting
- Notable work: Strings (2003–04), Past and Gone (2005)
- Movement: Gee's Bend Collective
- Children: Louisiana Bendolph (daughter in law)

Mary Lee Bendolph (born 1935) is an American quilt maker of the Gee's Bend Collective from Gee's Bend (Boykin), Alabama. Her work has been influential on subsequent quilters and artists and her quilts have been exhibited in museums and galleries around the country. Bendolph uses fabric from used clothing for quilting in appreciation of the "love and spirit" with old cloth. Bendolph has spent her life in Gee's Bend and has had work featured in the Philadelphia Museum of Art as well as the Minneapolis Institute of Art in Minnesota.

In 1999 the Los Angeles Times featured Bendolph in the Pulitzer Prize-winning article "Crossing Over", about the effort to reestablish ferry service across the Alabama River.

== Biography ==
Bendolph grew up in Gee's Bend, Alabama. She was raised in the quilting tradition, first taught by her mother, Aolar Mosely, at the age of 12, just two years before she began having children. She gave birth to her first child at age 14, which prevented her from going to school after the sixth grade. She married Rubin Bendolph in 1955 and they had eight children. In 1965, Bendolph participated in a march led by Martin Luther King, Jr. in Camden, Alabama. After retiring in 1992, Bendolph has devoted more time to quilt making.

During the Civil Rights Movement, the quilts from Gee's Bend gained national recognition when the women took part in the Freedom Quilting Bee. Quilts were sold across the United States and were used to bring back money to the community. The tradition of quilt making by enslaved females stretches back to the 18th century.

== Career ==
The quilts of Gee's Bend combine the styles of traditional African American quilts with a simple geometric style that has been compared to Amish quilts and modern artists such as Henri Matisse and Paul Klee. The Gee's Bend quilters began to attract critical attention in the late 1990s, leading to a major exhibition at the Whitney Museum of Modern Art, and numerous subsequent exhibitions and publications.

Like her fellow Gee's Bend members, Bendolph elevated common textiles (such as denim and corduroy) into vibrant and dynamic compositions. Attention from the formal art world has contributed to Bendolph's self-perception as an artist, in turn leading to a conscious attempt to make new work, such as her series of intaglio prints, which she made in collaboration with her daughter-in-law, Louisiana, in 2005.

In 2006 her quilt "Housetop" variation appeared on a US Postal service stamp as part of a series commemorating Gee's bend quilters.

Bendolph is one of the Gee's Bend quilters featured in the 2011 episode "Gee's Bend: The Most Famous Quilts in America", which was part five of a nine-part series titled Why Quilts Matter: History, Art & Politics.

She is a recipient of the 2015 National Heritage Fellowship awarded by the National Endowment for the Arts, which is the United States government's highest honor in the folk and traditional arts.

In 2020, the National Gallery of Art acquired one of Bendolph's quilts, along with work by eight other quilters from Gee's Bend.

== Exhibitions ==
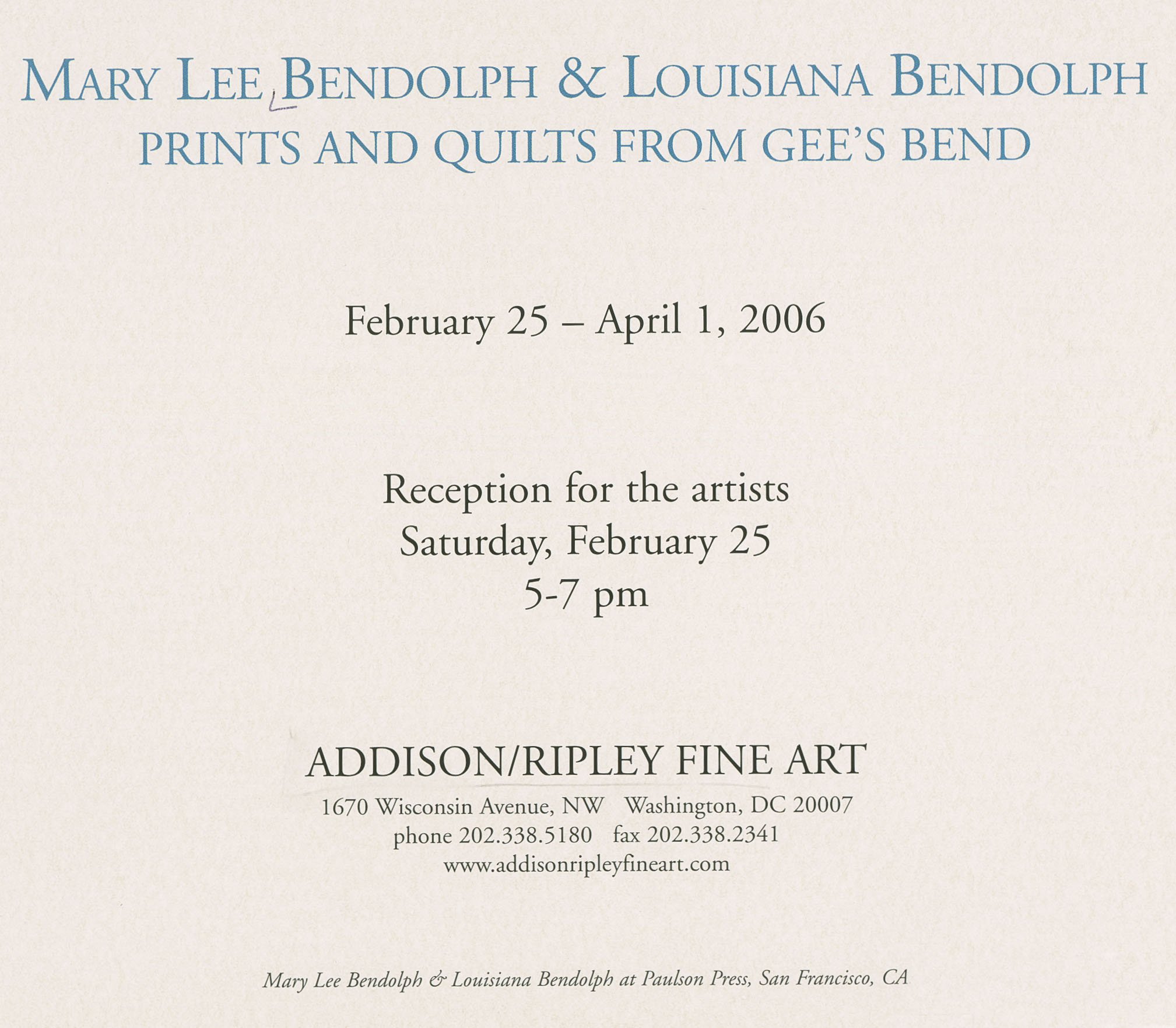
Addison/Ripley Fine Art exhibition announcement.

- The Quilt's of Gee's Bend, Whitney Museum of American Art, NYC, 2002.
- Recent Prints from Gee's Bend, Mary Lee Bendolph & Louisiana Bendolph, Elizabeth Leach Gallery, Portland, OR, October 6 – 29, 2005.
- Mary Lee Bendolph & Louisiana Bendolph: Prints and Quilts from Gee's Bend, Addison/Ripley Fine Art, Washington, DC, February 25 – April 1, 2006.
- Prints from Gee's Bend, Mary Lee Bendolph & Louisiana Bendolph, Solomon Projects, Atlanta, GA, April 20 – May 27, 2006.
- Gee's Bend: The Architecture of the Quilt, Museum of Fine Art, Houston, TX, 2006.
- Gee's Bend Quilts and Beyond, Museum of International Folk Art, Santa Fe, NM, Nov. 16, 2007 – May 11, 2008.
- Knoxville Museum of Art, July 10 – Sept. 21, 2008.
- Loveland Museum & Gallery, CO, Nov. 15, 2008 – Feb. 8, 2009.
- Missouri Historical Society, Apr. 12 – Sept. 13, 2009.
- Quilt's from Gee's Bend, Elizabeth Leach Gallery, Portland, OR, July 2 – August 1, 2009.
- Berman Museum of World History, AL, Oct. 2, 2009 – Jan. 3, 2010.
- Flint Institute of Arts, MI, Jan. 23 – Apr. 18, 2010.
- Piece Together: The Quilts of Mary Lee Bendolph, Mount Holyoke College Art Museum, South Hadley, MA, January 23 – May 27, 2018.
- Personal to Political: Celebrating the African American Artists of Paulson Fontaine Press, traveling exhibition, September 1, 2018 – August 20, 2022.
- Georgia Museum of Art, Athens, Georgia, November 2019.
- Making Community: Prints from Brandywine Workshop and Archives, Brodsky Center at PAFA, and Poulson-Fontaine Press, Pennsylvania Academy of the Fine Arts, Philadelphia, March – April 12, 2020.
- The Power of She, Franklin G. Burroughs-Simeon B. Chapin Art Museum, Myrtle Beach, South Carolina, June – August 30, 2020.
- Sarah Shepard Gallery, Larkspur, California, June – August 1, 2020.
- Power in My Hand: Celebrating Women's Suffrage, Palmer Museum of Art, State College, Pennsylvania, September 29 – December 13, 2020.
- Called To Create: Black Artists of the American South, National Gallery of Art, Washington, DC, September 18, 2022 – March 26, 2023.
- Piece Work: An Exhibition of Contemporary Gee's Bend Quilts, Oliver Art Center, Frankfort, Michigan, February 14 – March 22, 2025.

== Collections ==
- High Museum of Art, Atlanta
- Huntington Library, San Marino, California
- Minneapolis Institute of Art
- Museum of Modern Art, New York
- National Gallery of Art, Washington, D.C.
- Princeton University Art Museum, Princeton

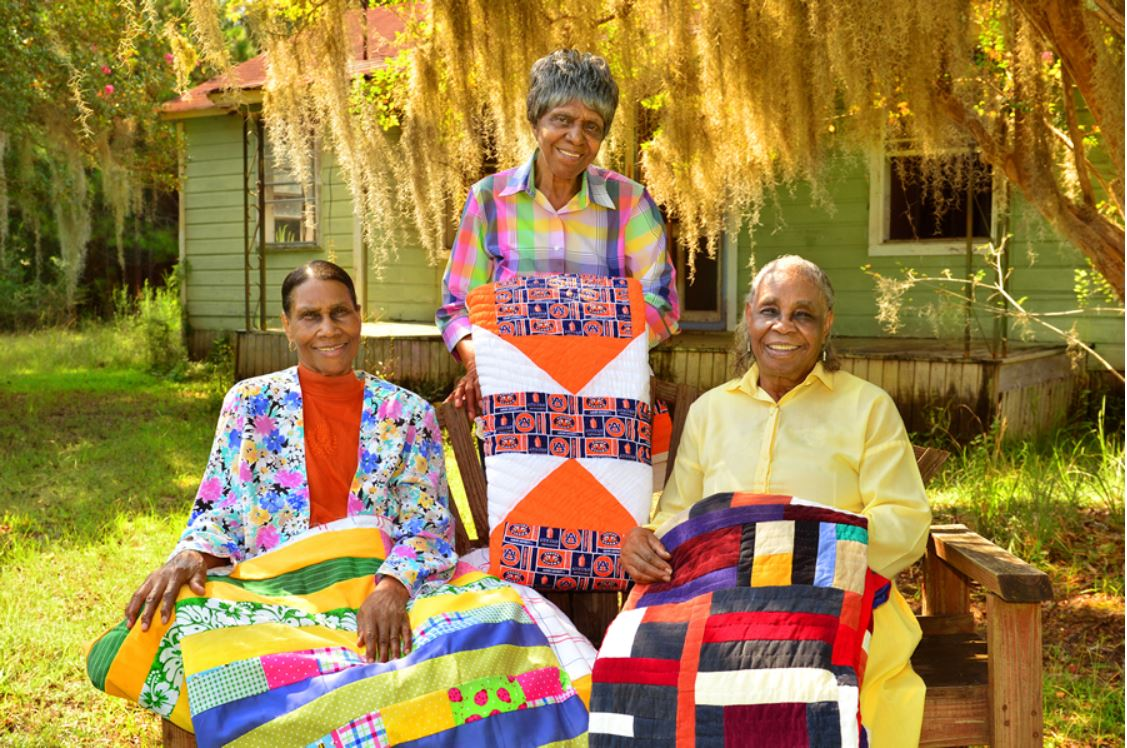
Three of the quilters of Gee's Bend (left to right): Loretta Pettway, Lucy Mingo and Bendolph

== See also ==
- Gee's Bend
- The Quilts of Gee's Bend
