= Pettway =

Pettway may refer to:

- Deborah Pettway Young (1916–1997), an American textile artist
- Jerry Pettway, an American basketball player
- Jessie T. Pettway, an American textile artist
- Ken Pettway (born 1964), American player of gridiron football
- Kenny Pettway, an American football player
- Vincent Pettway, an American boxer
