= Sue Willie Seltzer =

American artist (1922–2010)

Sue Willie Seltzer (1922–2010) was an American artist. She is associated with the Gee's Bend quilting collective. Her work has been exhibited at the Museum of Fine Arts, Houston and the National Gallery of Art, and is included in the collection of the New York Metropolitan Museum of Art and the Philadelphia Museum of Art.

== Life ==
Sue Willie Seltzer and her three siblings were raised by a single mother. Her mother needed the children to help support the family, so the children often went to Orrville to pick cotton for white families or their mother's brothers and sisters. Seltzer and her brother, being the oldest, were required to pick at least one hundred pounds of cotton per day. Being that Orrville was a twelve-mile walk away, or half a day's walk, this work would need to be completed very quickly.

Seltzer had at least one son, Benjamin, who married the former Boykin Postmaster, Bettie Bendolph Seltzer. Bettie Bendolph Seltzer was also a member of the Gee's Bend quilting collective and daughter of fellow quilt maker Annie Bendolph.

== Work ==
Seltzer began quilting later in life than some other members of the Gee's Bend quilting collective. In a 2002 interview, she recalled starting to quilt with the collective when she was thirty or forty years old. She learned by watching her peers join together and make quilts for one another. A true improvisational artist, Seltzer often borrowed other people's blocks, to piece together into one quilt. She would also take apart pillow-case sewing kits and use those materials for her quilts. She preferred large blocks and bold contrasts to small, meticulous pieces.

== Exhibitions ==
- The Quilts of Gee's Bend. 21 Nov. 2022- 9 Mar. 2003. Whitney Museum of American Art. New York, NY.
- The Quilts of Gee's Bend. 14 June 2003- 31 Aug. 2003. Mobile Museum of Art. Mobile, AL.
- Called to Create: Black Artists of the American South. 18 Sept. 2022- 26 Mar. 2023. National Gallery of Art. Washington, DC.
