= Minnie Sue Coleman =

American artist

Minnie Sue Coleman (October 11, 1926 – January 3, 2012) was an American artist. She was one of the Gee's Bend quilt-makers, along with her mother, Minder Coleman. In 2006, her quilt "Pig in a Pen" medallion appeared on a US Postal service stamp as part of a series commemorating Gee's bend quilters.
