= America Irby =

== Biography ==
America Irby (1916-1993) was an African American artist. She was associated with the Gee’s Bend quilting collective in Alabama. She participated in “string quilt” making, a way of making quilts without patterns that were often constructed from scrap cloth and found material. America Irby’s work is in the permanent collection of the Museum of Fine Arts, Houston.

America Irby was daughter of Lucy Burpo and Jake Irby. Her daughter Mensie Lee Pettway (1939) was also associated with the Gee’s bend quilting collective.

== List of Exhibitions ==
=== Gee's Bend: The Architecture of the Quilt ===
Museum of Fine Arts, Houston

June 4 – September 4, 2006

=== The Quilts of Gee's Bend ===
Museum of Fine Arts, Houston

September 6 – November 10, 2002
