= Annie Mae Young =

American artist (1928–2013)

Annie Mae Young (1928–2013) was an American artist associated with the Gee's Bend group of quilters. Her daughter, Nellie Mae Abrams, was also a quilter.

== Early life ==
Born in 1928 in Alberta, Alabama, Young was one of twelve children born to Lula and Albert Pettway. Albert Pettway grew cotton, corn, peas, sweet potatoes, and sorghum cane. Young mostly worked in the house with her mother cooking, cleaning, or tending to their personal garden. Young attended school until the 7th grade. The school she and her siblings attended was eight miles (13 km) away from their home and required them to walk arduously the entire way. Young began quilting at approximately age 13, when her father brought home scraps of fabric from Camden. Young married Lucius Young at age 16, and they had nine children. Lucius died in a car accident in 1970. Thereafter, Young began to cook and perform housework for a white family in Gastonburg, Alabama.

== Work ==
Young never joined the Freedom Quilting Bee because, in her words, "When they open up the quilting bee up there, they didn't want the kind of sewing and piecing I do, and I didn't like what they was doing. They had to do things too particular, too careful, too many little blocks. So I never did have nothing to do with them."

In 1997, a photograph of Young's Strip Medallion quilt, now in the collection of the Metropolitan Museum of Art, led art historian William Arnett to begin collecting the work of quilters from Gee's Bend (Boykin, Alabama). Arnett helped to establish the quilters on the national stage.

In 2006 her quilt Blocks and Strips appeared on a US Postal service stamp as part of a series commemorating Gee's Bend quilters. Her work is included in the collections of the Metropolitan Museum of Art, Houston Museum of Fine Arts, the Seattle Art Museum, and the High Museum of Art.

== Later life ==
In 2007, Young accused William Arnett and his son of failing to compensate her for the sale of her quilts and the production of images of her quilts. She filed a lawsuit against various parties seeking a share of the profits from the quilt enterprise. In 2008, a lawyer for Young said that the suits had "been resolved".
