= Nellie Mae Abrams =

American artist (1946–2005)

Nellie Mae Abrams (Photograph by Abrams Family)

Nellie Mae Abrams (1946–2005) was an American artist. She is associated with the Gee's Bend quilting collective. Her art has been exhibited at the Museum of Fine Arts, Houston and the Gund Gallery at Kenyon College, and is included in the collection of the Minneapolis Institute of Art and the Philadelphia Museum of Art. She was the daughter of Annie Mae Young, who was also a quiltmaker.
