= Deborah Pettway Young =

American artist

Deborah Pettway Young (1916–1997) was an American artist associated with the Gee's Bend group of quilters.

== Life ==
Pronounced "D-bora", Deborah Pettway Young was the daughter of Louvenia and Paul Pettway. Her mother died when Deborah was seven years old, and she was thereafter raised by her father. He remarried twice, but Deborah had trouble adjusting to life with both of her step-mothers.

She married Nettie Young's father and together they raised three girls: Nettie Young, Lola Saulsberry, and Arcola Pettway. She was active in her church community and sang in church.

== Work ==
Young was a versatile textile artist. Never working from prefabricated patterns, she could see a dress or quilt and replicate it herself without guidance. Her daughter, Lola Saulsberry, expressed her shock at her mother's international recognition as an artist when she said in an interview, "I never dreamed that people would pay attention to her and Arcola's quilts. They were just making them to keep warm."

Her work is included in the collection of the Fine Arts Museums of San Francisco.
