= Minder Coleman =

American artist (1903–1999)

- Born: October 11, 1903
- Died: May 16, 1999 (aged 95)

Minder Pettway Coleman (October 11, 1903 – May 16, 1999) was an American artist. She was one of the Gee's Bend quilt-makers, along with her older sister Delia Bennett and her daughter Minnie Sue Coleman.

== Life ==
Mrs. Coleman was born in Wilcox County, Alabama in October 1903, and lived just one mile from the famous Gee’s Bend in the Freedom Quilting Bee’s hay day. Coleman was an active citizen of Gee's Bend, Alabama. Minder learned to quilt as a small child, and soon realized she had a knack for the art. Mrs. Coleman was a farmer her whole life, and also spent some years working at a cloth factory, and later an okra factory. While working at the cloth factory, she would collect the discarded scraps of fabric, and save them for use in her quilts. She also frequently used flour and fertilizer sack fabric in her quilts. Once she joined the Freedom Quilting Bee, she donated the scraps she had collected to her fellow quilting artists. Minder’s most famous quilting style is the Double Wedding Ring; she also created her own pattern that resembled two eggplants joined together. She was as the president of the Gee's Bend Farms agricultural cooperative, established by the Farm Security Administration in the 1930s, and was vice-president of the Freedom Quilting Bee, established in 1966. She was also a member of Gee's Bend's weaving cooperative in the 1930s.

== Career ==
Quilters communed and worked together at Coleman's house before the Freedom Quilting Bee was founded, so it is no wonder that Coleman worked there full-time from 1966- 1978. Along with Mattie Ross and Patsy Mosely, Coleman wove draperies 76 inches wide and 250 inches long for the Roosevelt White House. She also wove a blue- and- white striped cloth for a suit for Franklin Delano Roosevelt, of which local lore holds that he was buried in. Mrs. Coleman did not receive pay for her work for the Freedom Quilting Bee Co-operative, nor did she receive money for the sale of her quilts. She instead gave the money to the Quilting Bee to be used for the creation of a new center for the quilters. Mrs. Coleman continued to work full-time for the Bee until 1978 when her husband became ill, and subsequently died later that same year.
