= Sanjwal railway station =

Railway station in Pakistan

Sanjwal Railway Station سنجوال ریلوے اسٹیشن
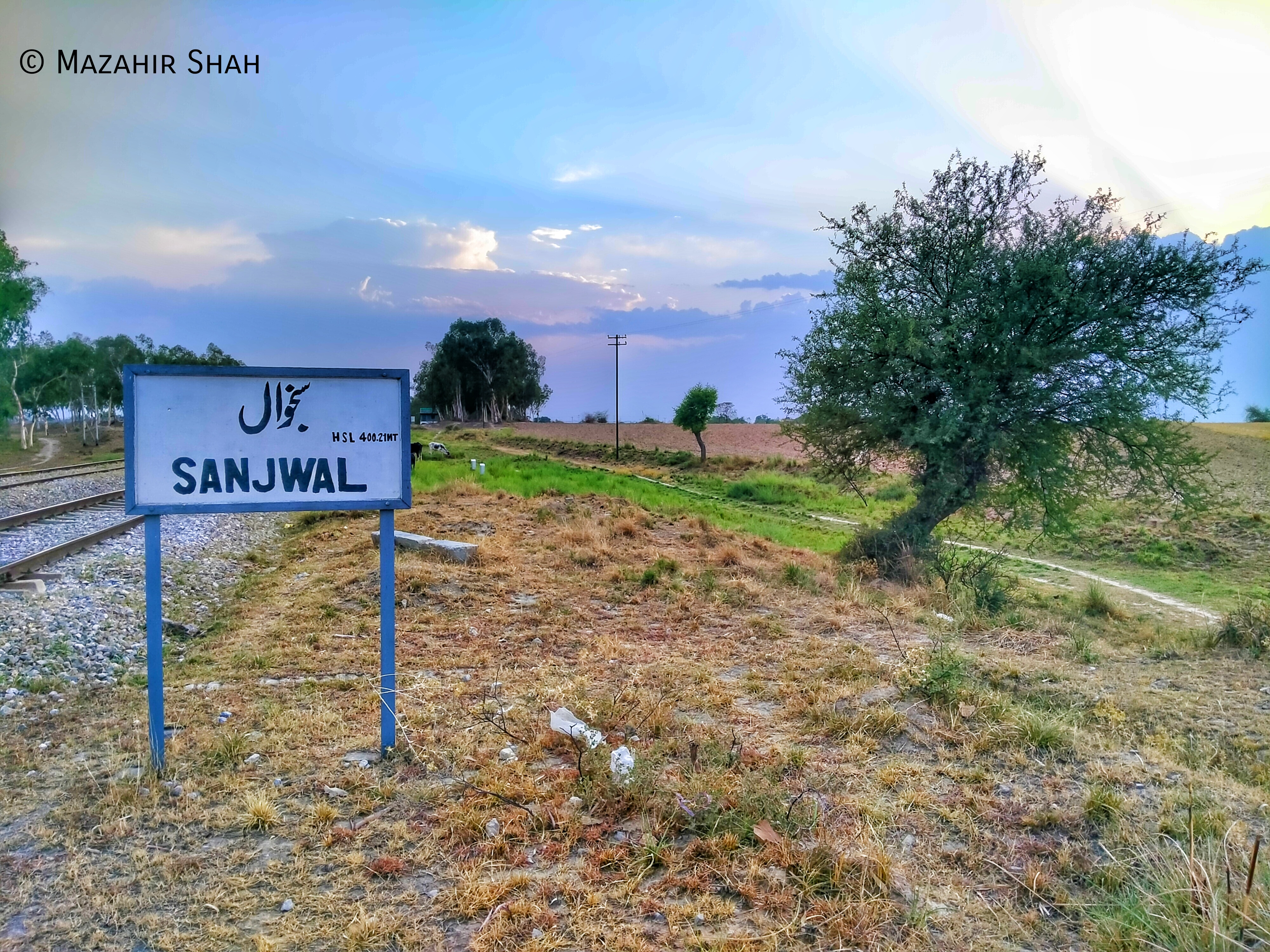

General information
- Coordinates: 33.8110°N 72.4406°E
- Owner: Ministry of Railways
- Line: Karachi–Peshawar Railway Line

Other information
- Station code: SJU

Services
Preceding station	Pakistan Railways	Following station
Faqirabad towards Kiamari	Karachi–Peshawar Line	Attock City Junction towards Peshawar Cantonment
Location

Sanjwal Railway Station (Urdu and Punjabi: سنجوال ریلوے اسٹیشن) is located in Sanjwal village, Attock district of Punjab province, Pakistan.

== See also ==
- List of railway stations in Pakistan
- Pakistan Railways
