= Aolar Mosely =

American artist (1912–1999)

Aolar Carson Mosely (May 12, 1912 – October 29, 1999) was an American artist. She was a founding member of the Freedom Quilting Bee, and is associated with the Gee's Bend quiltmakers, along with her daughter Mary Lee Bendolph and her granddaughter Essie Bendolph Pettway. Almost all of her quilts were destroyed when her house burned down in 1984.

== Early life ==
Born in May 1912, Mosely was one of eleven children of the Elizabeth Pettway Carson and Sim Carson family. Her mother was very active in the quilting community and would often host quilting bees at their home.As a small child, Aolar along with her siblings helped collect the materials for her mother to use as quilting frames. They would collect the wood from nearby forests that their father would fashion into the quilting frames. Aolar learned to sew at the young age of eleven when she sewed a dress for herself that her mother had cut out to be sewn. Aolar used a sewing machine both then, and when she quilted. It wasn’t until the age of twelve though that Aolar made her first quilt. Aolar was unable to finish school past fifth grade as her family was unable to afford to send her.

She married Wisdom Mosely in 1929. Together they had seventeen children, only thirteen of whom survived childhood. In 1932, they lost everything to a raid of their property by agents of the Camden merchant's estate. However, in 1935, her family benefited from New Deal program called the Resettlement Administration, followed by the Farm Security Administration. With assistance from the Resettlement Administration, she and her family bought a house and 116 acres of arable land in Gee's Bend.

She developed dementia later in life. After her house caught fire in 1984, which destroyed all of her remaining quilts, she spent her remaining years living with her daughter, Mary Lee Bendolph.

== Work ==
Mosely's mother taught her how to quilt at a young age. Her father bought her a sewing machine, and thus, she was one of the only people in Gee's bend to quit entirely by machine. Her family was a cornerstone of the quilting community, and even made frames from found wood for other quilters. She was a founding member of and tireless resource for the Freedom Quilting Bee. She prided herself on the efficiency with which the bee ran when she was managing it. "When they get there, they ain't got nothing to do but go to sewing."

She worked for the bee until 1981 and then spent most of her time there volunteering. However, her earnings from the quilting bee allowed her to, over time, purchase a washing machine, indoor plumbing, and a freezer.
