= Polly Bennett =

American artist (1922–2003)

- Polly Bennett in front of her home in Alabama in 2000, photographed by David Raccuglia
- Born: 1922; Boykin, Alabama, U.S.
- Died: 2003 (aged 80–81); U.S.
- Occupation: Artist
- Known for: Member of the Gee's Bend quilting collective

Polly Mooney Bennett (1922–2003) was an American artist. She is associated with the Gee's Bend quilting collective and was a member of the Freedom Quilting Bee. Her work has been exhibited in the Museum of Fine Arts, Houston.

== Biography ==
Polly Bennett was born and raised in Boykin, Alabama, also known as Gee's Bend, in 1922. Her parents, Mary and Minniefield Mooney, separated in 1928 and left her in the care of her grandmother Mary Brown Mooney. Mary Mooney was a tenant farmer, and Polly helped on the farm starting at a young age. Polly was able to attend a school in Boiling Springs but was no longer able to attend after grade six. She found work nursing and cooking for various white families in the area. She married Mark Bennett in 1946. They maintained a farm on Rehoboth Rd. for the remainder of their lives. Bennett began quilting under her mother's instruction at about eight years old. She recalls struggling at first, "...back then what I made be so much longer on one side than the other. I didn't start getting them exactly right for a long while." She completed her first quilts at 15 years old and is now regarded as one of the most precise quilt makers in the Souls Grown Deep Foundation's collection.
