= Estelle Witherspoon =

American artist and civil rights activist (1916–1998)

Estelle Abrams Witherspoon (January 20, 1916 – December 24, 1998) was an American artist, civil rights activist, and a founding member and longtime manager of the Freedom Quilting Bee. She is also associated with the Gee's Bend quilting group, alongside her mother, Willie "Ma Willie" Abrams.

== Biography ==
Estelle Witherspoon is the only daughter of “Ma” Willie Abrams. Estelle is one of the founding members, of the Freedom Quilting Bee, and was its spokesperson and manager since its inception. Estelle's extensive background in civil rights activism includes working to achieve voting rights, and later working as a poll worker. Furthermore, she participated in the march from Selma to Montgomery in 1965, alongside Lucy Mingo. She was also arrested in 1971 for participating in an un-permitted march for school desegregation.

== Exhibitions ==
- "Living Legacies: Art of the African American South." Toledo Museum of Art. January 15th to May 1st, 2022.
- "Radical Tradition: American Quilts and Social Change." Toledo Museum of Art. November 21st, 2020 to February 14th, 2021.
