= Nettie Young =

American artist

Nettie Pettway Young (1916–2010) was an American artist associated with the Gee's Bend quilting collective and an assistant manager of the Freedom Quilting Bee. Her work has been exhibited at the Museum of Fine Arts, Houston and the Frist Art Museum, and is included in the collections of the Philadelphia Museum of Art and the Nasher Museum of Art.

== Life ==
Nettie Pettway Young's paternal grandfather and father were enslaved in Alberta, Alabama. Her grandfather was born to the Irby Plantation, but was sold to the Pettway Plantation. There he raised Nettie's father. Thus, his last name was Pettway until he gained his freedom when he was an adult and moved to the Young Plantation to sharecrop. Nettie was raised on the Young Plantation after sharecropping when her father and her step-mother, Deborah Pettway Young, rented land from the Young Plantation. Nettie only attended around eight months of school in her life due to the family not being able to afford to send her or her siblings. In the 1960s Nettie took part in the civil rights movement and was even arrested for her participation in them.

== Personal life and death ==
Nettie married Clint Young and together the couple had eleven children. They bought a house together from their landlord, the Wilkinson family. It was an original 1930's "project house," which they later received an FHA loan to afford. Nettie lived in that house and tended to the surrounding land until she died.

== Work ==
Young worked with a keen intuition for construction that she learned from her step-mother, Deborah Pettway Young. She made all of her children's clothes and did not use patterns for sewing clothes or quilts. Nettie was a co-manager and quilter starting at the very beginning of the Freedom Quilting Bee’s existence. When she joined the Freedom Quilting Bee, she began to use patterns common among her peers, and this, she said, stifled her creativity. "It broke the ideas I had in my head. I should have stayed with my own ideas." One of Nettie's favorite quilt patterns is reported to be The Bricklayer pattern.

== Exhibitions ==
- "Souls Grown Deep: Artists of the African American South" -Philadelphia Museum of Art, June 8 - September 2, 2019.
- "Cosmologies from the Tree of Life: Art from the African American South" -Virginia Museum of Fine Arts, June 8 - November 17, 2019.
- "Creation Story: Gee's Bend Quilts and the Art of Thorton Dial" -First Center for the Visual Arts, May 25 - September 2, 2012.
- "Gee's Bend: the Architecture of the Quilt" -Museum of Fine Arts, Houston, June 4 - September 4, 2006.
- "The Quilts of Gee's Bend" -Museum of Fine Arts, Houston, September 4 - November 10, 2002.
