= Louisiana Bendolph =

American artist (born 1960)

Louisiana Bendolph (born October 20, 1960) is an American visual artist and quilt maker. Bendolph is associated with The Quilts of Gee's Bend and her work has been considered more conceptual because of her use of vibrant color.

== Art ==
Bendolph's work begins with sketches, and ultimately moves to fabric through innovation and improvisation. Her quilts typically start out as housetop, a pattern based on concentric squares resembling a birds-eye-view of a roof of a house, but during her quilting process, take on new shapes.

Bendolph's creations have exhibited at the Addison Ripley Gallery in Washington, D.C., and in Seattle at the Greg Kucera Gallery. Her work in the exhibition "Gee's Bend: The Architecture of the Quilt" was on display at the Walters Art Museum in 2007.

Bendolph also produces prints from etchings. Her print "American Housetop (for the Arnetts)" (2005), which is dedicated to the family who linked Gee's Bend with the museum world, was on display at Lehman College Art Gallery in 2015 along with 14 quilts and photographs.

Her 2013 work, entitled As I Leave I Shall Return, is also on display at the Baltimore Museum of Art.

== Personal life ==
Louisiana Bendolph was born to Rita Mae Pettway and Samuel Small. Bendolph grew up on a farm, along with her two siblings, David and Hazel. In her childhood, Bendolph was fascinated by quiltmaking. The artist later would describe fond memories of watching her mother and other relatives sew, while the children would play under the quilts.

At nineteen, the artist gave birth to a daughter (Sonda). A year later, Louisiana married Sonda's father. They had their second daughter, Melinda, in 1982. And in 1990 she gave birth to Merrianna. She had her last daughter, Alleeanna, in 1997.

In 1991, Louisiana Bendolph got a job at the Lee company. She worked at Lee, putting zippers and pockets into jeans, until the company moved that part of their operation abroad in 1997.

Quilt making remained an important part of Louisiana's world throughout her adult life. In the year following the birth of her first child, the artist made about eight quilts (which were mostly pattern quilts). When Louisiana moved from Gee's Bend to Mobile, she brought her quilt with her. The artist continued to make quilts in their new home.

In 2002, Louisiana attended a quilt exhibit in Houston with her mother. When they arrived in Houston, she saw a quilt book there with one of her pieces in it. The realization shocked her, and is something that the artist still has not gotten over when she sees her work on display.
