= Annie Bendolph =

American artist (1900–1981)

Annie Pettway Lewis Bendolph
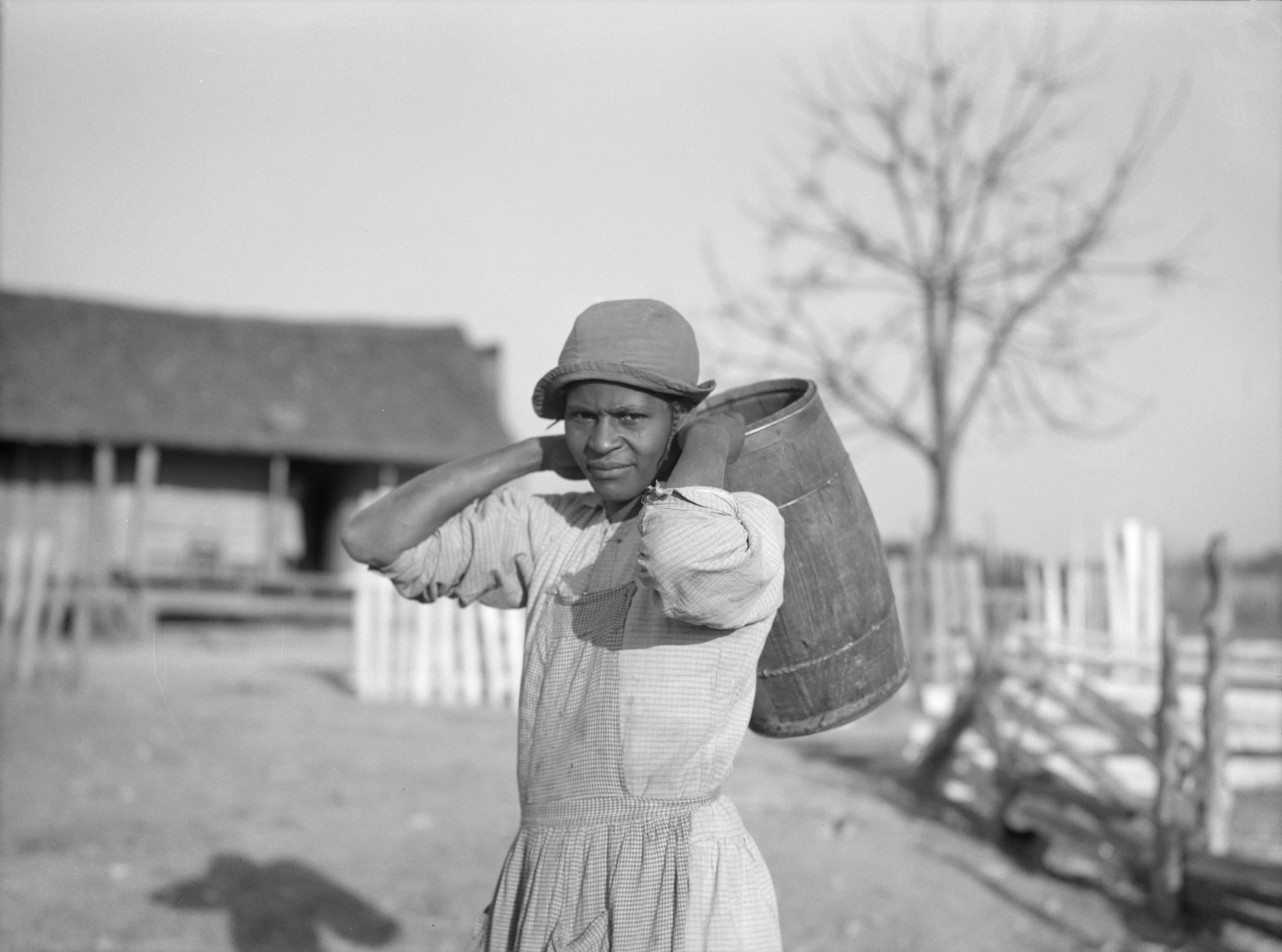
- Annie Pettway Lewis Bendolph carrying water in Gee's Bend, Alabama, April 1937. Photographed by Arthur Rothstein
- Born: 1900
- Died: 1981 (aged 80–81)
- Occupation: Quilter
- Spouse: Jacob Bendolph

Annie Pettway Lewis Bendolph (1900–1981) was an American artist associated with the Gee's Bend group of quilters. Her work is included in the collection of the Metropolitan Museum of Art, to which it was donated by the Souls Grown Deep Foundation.

== Early life ==
In a biographical interview, Bendolph's daughter Bettie Bendolph Seltzer describes her mother as very tenacious and caring. "I always wanted to be like my mama—hardworking, having something of my own. She was so independent. But I never wanted to have to go through what she went through."

Annie Bendolph's mother died when she was very young. Annie had a brother, Timothy Pettway, who sang in gospel choirs in the nearby town of Camden, Alabama. Bendolph married Jacob Bendolph and raised 16 children.

== Work ==
Bendolph's quilts were made exclusively of utilitarian, recycled materials, such as old clothes and empty sacks. Seltzer recalls,

When I was growing up, Mama made quilts to keep us warm. The ladies then piece their quilts at home and go to each other house to help quilt. At the start all they was making them out was old clothes, pants, fertilizer sacks, dress tails, and meal and flour sacks, too. That's it. They had to beat the cotton to pad it out to put it in the quilt. Their husband or friend or neighbor bring cotton from the gin for the ladies to quilt with. Later on, coming down through the years, there was places they'd go and get scraps from factories that was giving it to them, but they have to hire somebody to go pick up the scraps. That's when the quilts started becoming more up-to-date.

Most Gee's Bend quilts were made from recycled materials until the Freedom Quilting Bee brought more resources to the community.
