= Willie Abrams =

American artist and quilter (1897–1987)

"Ma Willie" Abrams (Photograph by Abrams Family)

Willie Abrams (1897–1987), also known as Ma Willie, was an American artist. She was a member of the Freedom Quilting Bee, along with her daughter Estelle Witherspoon, and is associated with the Gee's Bend quilters. Some of “Ma” Willie’s quilts are in the permanent collection of The Metropolitan Museum of Art and the Fine Arts Museum of San Francisco.

== Biography ==
“Ma Willie" Abrams was born in 1897 in Wilcox County Alabama, where she was raised by her grandmother. “Ma” Willie was one of the oldest participating members until her death in 1987. She began quilting at the age of twelve, with the guidance of her grandmother. While she did know how to use a sewing machine, she normally chose to work by hand. “Ma” Willie and her husband Eugene Abrams were tenant farmers, which they continued until the Quilting Bee provided them with an alternative way to earn a living. “Ma” Willie would mostly craft bonnets for the Bee, which were to be sold for $2 a piece. When “Ma” Willie did quilt she preferred to do so at her own home instead of at the sewing center, often choosing to sew on her front porch.

== Exhibitions ==
- "Revelations: Art from the African American South." - De Young Museum. June 3 to April 1, 2018.
- "Gee's Bend: The Architecture of the Quilt." - Museum of Fine Arts, Houston. June 4 to September 4, 2006.
- "The Quilts of Gee's Bend." - Museum of Fine Arts, Houston. September 6 to November 10, 2002.
- "The Quilts of Gee's Bend." - Whitney Museum of American Art. November 21, 2002, to March 9, 2003.
- "The Quilts of Gee's Bend." - Mobile Museum of Art. June 14 to August 31, 2003.
- "The Quilts of Gee's Bend." - Milwaukee Art Museum. September 27, 2003 to January 4, 2004.
- "The Quilts of Gee's Bend." - Corcoran Gallery of Art. February 14 to May 17, 2004.
- "The Quilts of Gee's Bend." - Cleveland Museum of Art. June 27 to September 12, 2004.
- "The Quilts of Gee's Bend." - Chrysler Museum of Art. October 15, 2004 to January 2, 2005.
- "The Quilts of Gee's Bend." - Memphis Brooks Museum of Art. February 13 to May 8, 2005.
- "The Quilts of Gee's Bend." - Museum of Fine Arts, Boston. June 1 to August 21, 2005.
- "The Quilts of Gee's Bend." - The Jule Collins Smith Museum of Fine Art at Auburn University. September 11 to December 4, 2005.
- "The Quilts of Gee's Bend." - High Museum of Art. March 25 to June 18, 2006.
- "The Quilts of Gee's Bend." - Fine Arts Museum of San Francisco, M. H. De Young Memorial Museum. July 15 to November 12, 2006.
- "Gee's Bend: The Architecture of a Quilt." - Orlando Museum of Art. January 28 to April 22, 2007.
- "Gee's Bend: The Architecture of a Quilt." -Walters Art Museum. June 17 to August 26, 2008.
- "The Quilts of Gee's Bend." - Museum of Art Fort Lauderdale. September 6, 2007 to January 7, 2008.
- "Gee's Bend: The Architecture of a Quilt." - Denver Museum of Art. April 13 to July 6, 2008.
- "Gee's Bend: The Architecture of a Quilt." - Philadelphia Museum of Art. August 2 to October 2, 2008.
