= Faqirabad railway station =

Railway station in Pakistan

Faqirabad railway station فقیر آباد ریلوے اسٹیشن
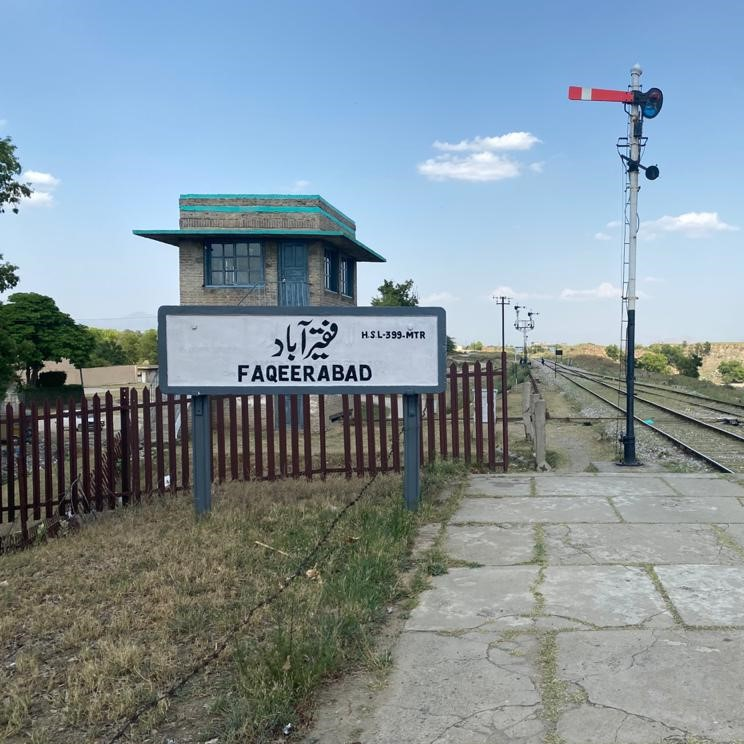

General information
- Coordinates: 33.8268°N 72.5036°E
- Elevation: 399 m (1,309 ft)
- Owner: Ministry of Railways
- Line: Karachi–Peshawar Railway Line

Other information
- Station code: FQB

History
- Opened: 1880
- Former names: Lawrencepur railway station

Services
Preceding station	Pakistan Railways	Following station
Burhan towards Kiamari	Karachi–Peshawar Line	Sanjwal towards Peshawar Cantonment
Location

Faqirabad railway station (Urdu: فقیر آباد ریلوے اسٹیشن) is located in Faqirabad village, Attock district of Punjab province, Pakistan.

== See also ==
- List of railway stations in Pakistan
- Pakistan Railways
