= Anne Young (academic) =

Chemist and researcher

Anne M. Young
- Education: Imperial College London
- Scientific career
- Workplaces: University College London; Brunel University London; BP

Anne M. Young is a Professor of Biomaterials at University College London, where she works on the development and characterisation of new materials for the repair of tooth and bone.

== Early life and education ==
Young studied chemistry at Imperial College London, where she earned her bachelor's degree in 1986. She remained there for her doctoral studies in polymer physics. She moved to the petroleum industry, and joined BP as a colloid scientist in 1990. In 1992 she joined the UCL School of Pharmacy as a postdoctoral researcher.

== Research and career ==
Young was appointed to Brunel University London as a lecturer in chemistry. Young noticed a decline in the petroleum industry. She moved to the Schottlander Dental Company as a research scientist in 1998 before joining University College London as a lecturer in 2000.

At University College London, Young was a member of the Eastman Dental Hospital. Her work considers degradable and non-degradable composite bone cements, as well as dental restorative materials. She works with polymers, composites and metals. In restorative dentistry, one of the biggest hazards is leakage of bacteria. Young creates fluid pastes that can be put in place of a tooth and set with light. Once set, these pastes form permanent materials with similar properties to the nearby teeth. By designing the pastes such that they swell when they absorb water, Young can overcome shrinkage, and by incorporating antibacterial agents she can overcome the dangers of bacterial leakage. She works closely with material scientists, dentists and microbiologists.

Alongside the design of materials for dentistry, Young is developing degradable materials for bone repair. Similar to the dental materials, injectable materials for bone repair or drug delivery can mimic nearby bone. These bone repair materials can be used for gene therapy. To analyse the materials during set and degradation, Young uses vibrational spectroscopy such as FTIR and Raman mapping.

Young was promoted to Professor in 2015. She delivered her inaugural lecture at University College London in 2016. She spoke about new materials to repair tooth decay and damage from osteoporosis.
