= Jessie T. Pettway =

American artist (1929–2023)

Jessie T. Pettway (1929 – November 28, 2023) was an American artist associated with the Gee's Bend group of quilters.

In 2006 her quilt Bars and string-pieced columns appeared on a US Postal service stamp as part of a series commemorating Gee's Bend quilters. Her work is included in the collection of the Art Institute of Chicago and the Fine Arts Museums of San Francisco.

== Life ==
A woman of many names, Jessie T. Pettway was given the name J.T. at birth, most called her by her nickname, "Bootnie", and she always referred to herself as "Jessie", after her favorite school teacher.

Jessie T. Pettway was born in Primrose, Alabama, to a single mother, Channie Pettway. Although she knew her father, Joe Benning, and passed his house frequently, he did not play an active role in her or her siblings' lives. Her mother died at a young age, and she and her siblings lived with her mother's sister, Seebell Kennedy ("Little Sis"), and her husband, Alp Kennedy, thereafter.

Their days were long and filled with chores before and after school. Their farm grew cotton, corn, peas, peanuts, and sweet potatoes, as well as the variety of vegetables that were on their own plot for subsistence use. They also raised livestock, such as goats and hogs.

Pettway completed schooling up to the eleventh grade. She married Monroe Pettway and together they raised seven girls and two boys.

Pettway died in 2023, at the age of 94.

== Work ==
After the farm chores were completed, their aunt Seebell would sit the girls down and teach them to piece and sew quilts. Jessie's first quilt was an "Eight Pointed Star" pattern. She began completing patterns by herself at age twelve. Always using repurposed cloth and materials given to her by community members or her family in Mobile, Alabama, Jessie recalled, "My aunt had a old book of patterns that she sometime used, but I didn't like no book patterns. I couldn't buy pretty materials, so I couldn't make pretty patterns." She often preferred the "Bricklayer" pattern because "you could make it into something pretty with any old kind of cloth."
