= Lucy Mingo =

American quilt maker

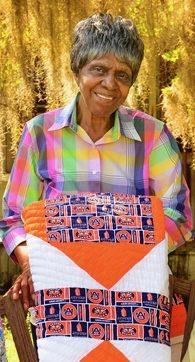
- Mingo in 2015
- Born: Lucy Marie Young; 1931 (age 94–95); Boykin, Alabama, U.S.
- Known for: Quilting
- Notable work: Chestnut Bud
- Movement: Freedom Quilting Bee; Gee's Bend Collective

Lucy Marie (Young) Mingo (born 1931) is an American quilt maker and member of the Gee's Bend Collective from Gee's Bend (Boykin), Alabama. She was an early member of the Freedom Quilting Bee, which was an alternative economic organization created in 1966 to raise the socio-economic status of African-American communities in Alabama. She was also among the group of citizens who accompanied Martin Luther King Jr. on his 1965 march from Selma to Montgomery, Alabama.

Mingo is a recipient of a 2015 National Heritage Fellowship awarded by the National Endowment for the Arts, which is the highest honor in the folk and traditional arts in the United States.

== Early life ==
Lucy Young was born in 1931 in Rehoboth, Alabama, a settlement near Gee's Bend to Ethel and Earl Young. Her nickname is "Toot". Her father was a sharecropper who also worked as a longshoreman in Mobile, Alabama which required him to be away from the family for long periods of time. Lucy and her siblings worked the fields growing corn, peas, potatoes, peanuts, and cotton to earn a meager living.

Mingo went to Boykin elementary school, and at age 13 was sent to the Allen Institute in Mobile. After graduation from Allen, she moved back to Boykin and married David Mingo in 1949, at age 17. She and David had ten children, seven of them daughters but only one of her children (Polly) quilts.

She is a fourth-generation quilter, with her mother, grandmother, and older close family friend all inspiring her and teaching her their art. She pieced her first quilt top at the age of fourteen.

== Career ==
=== Non-quilt making career ===
After she married, Mingo returned to farm labor and continued there until 1965. She then worked as a cook in the school cafeteria for ten years, but was laid off. She worked in Selma for a year, and then got a job as a homemaking educator for the Auburn University extension service for more than 20 years, teaching people how to cook, can, and freeze. She retired at age 69, after her mother became ill.

Like many women in Gee's Bend, Mingo squeezed in quilting time after completing work at her other jobs.

=== Freedom Quilting Bee ===
Mingo was a founding member of the Freedom Quilting Bee (FQB), which began during the Civil Rights Movement. Their quilts were sold across the United States and brought much-needed money back to the Gee's Bend economy. Mingo had a reputation within the Bee as an excellent teacher, and one of her specialties was the "Chestnut Bud" which had a deep-seated history in Wilcox County, Alabama, but at the time Mingo claimed she was the only member of the FQB who knew how to make that quilt, so she taught her fellow members the details of that pattern. Two of Mingo's black-and-white Chestnut Buds were sold via the Bee to Vogue magazine editor Diana Vreeland. Estelle Witherspoon, the Bee's first manager, and Mingo led a twelve-woman team that produced a Chestnut Bud quilt, sofa cover, and drapes for CBS chairman William S. Paley and his wife.

The women of the FQB were very aware of and many were active in the civil rights movement. Members of the FQB heard Dr. Martin Luther King Jr. speak in Gee's Bend in 1965 and many of them, including Mingo, were inspired to register to vote as a result. Mingo says she "marched in Montgomery and over the Pettus Bridge, but I wasn't in the one with John Lewis" and she avoided getting arrested because she had children. Mingo was considered "one of Gee's Bend's leading spokespersons during the civil rights era".

The Bee was founded in part to provide employment to women who lost work when they took a stand for civil rights and registered to vote, which happened to Mingo. At one point, the Bee was the largest employer in the town of Rehoboth.

The Freedom Quilting Bee's numbers declined in the 1990s due to an aging membership, plus weather damage to their community space. After the death of the last original board member, the Bee officially closed in 2012.

=== Gee's Bend Collective ===
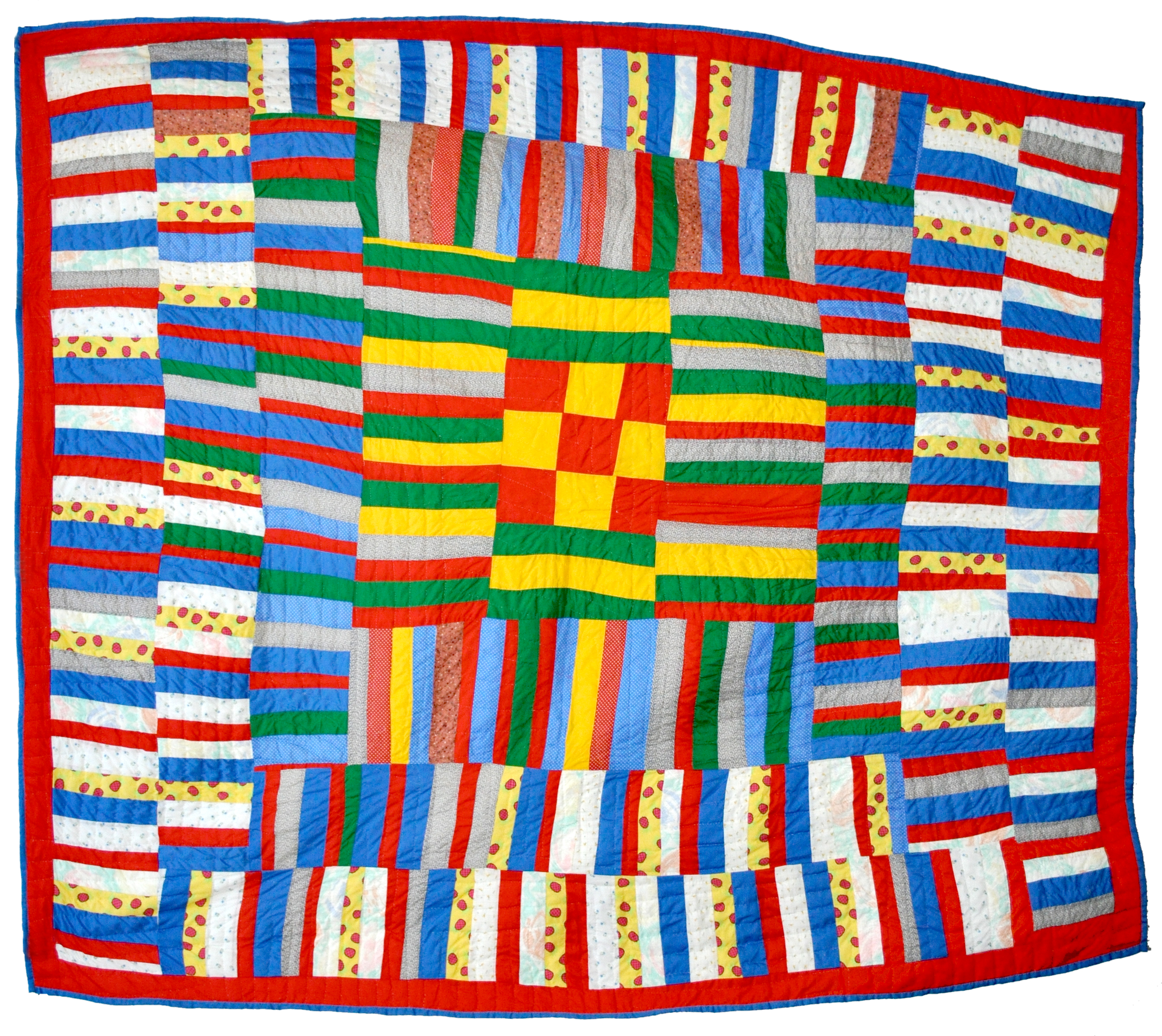
Mingo made this pieced quilt in 1979. It includes a nine-patch center block surrounded by pieced strips. Collection of Bill Volckening, Portland, Oregon.

Mingo quilted as a member of both the Freedom Quilting Bee and the Gee's Bend Collective, which had similar economic missions and some overlapping membership. The FQB, however, required the quilters to use standardized patterns to make the quilts more marketable, while the Collective members are allowed artistic freedom in the design and execution of their quilts. The work and artistry of the Collective gained national attention in 2002 when an exhibition of seventy of the women's quilts was assembled by folk art collector and art historian William Arnett and his Tinwood Alliance in conjunction with The Museum of Fine Arts, Houston. The exhibition called "The Quilts of Gee's Bend" traveled to ten other museums around the country, including the Whitney Museum of American Art in New York. An article about the Whitney exhibition in The New York Times brought even more national attention to the artistry of the Gee's Bend quilts, when the reviewer wrote that the quilts "turn out to be some of the most miraculous works of modern art America has produced".

Mingo's contribution to the 2002 exhibition was in the area of "work clothes" turned into quilts. In her early years, Mingo frequently used old denim and cotton shirts worn during field work as material for her quilts. Mingo said about these quilts, "You know, we had hard times. We worked in the fields, we picked cotton, and sometimes we had it and sometimes we didn't. And so you look at your quilt and you say 'This is some of the old clothes I wore in the fields. I wore them out, but they still doing good.' "

The attention and praise the Gee's Bend Collective members received from the art world as the 2002 exhibit toured the country surprised them. Mingo said "When we see our quilts in museums, we're just amazed. We never thought quilts would get there." Mingo also said about the effect of the exhibition: "Yes, they are about history because quilts have been here all the time. But in another way, these quilts just became history because before they were hidden in the closets and on the bed mattresses. When you take them out, they become history. Until quilts made history, people weren't paying attention. Now, everyone wants to see your quilts; they want to know what you're making."

Following the success of the 2002 exhibition, Mingo was often hired as leading quiltmaking instructor at events across the United States. In addition, the prices for her quilts increased dramatically. Before working at the Freedom Quilting Bee, Mingo's quilts would sell for about $5.00. A 2008 quilting identification and price book includes a Mingo quilt made in 2004 valued at "more than $5,000".

In 2006, the Museum of Fine Arts, Houston and the Tinwood Alliance mounted a second exhibition titled "Gee's Bend: The Architecture of the Quilt" that included works by Mingo. That exhibition's itinerary included eight museums throughout the United States.

Mingo was one of two Gee's Bend Collective quilt makers featured in a 2014 episode titled "Industry" of the PBS television series Craft in America.

In 2014, it was reported that because she is over 80 years old, Mingo rarely makes new quilts anymore. But her quilts are still included in exhibitions, including the 2017 Outsider Art Fair held in New York City. In May 2018, Mingo traveled to New York City to attend the opening of an exhibition at the Metropolitan Museum of Art titled "History Refused to Die: Highlights from the Souls Grown Deep Foundation" that included some of Mingo's quilts, as well as others from the Gee's Bend Collective.

In 2022, Mingo and four other Gee's Bend quilters entered into an arrangement with Macy's department stores to sell reproductions of their quilts online and on-site in Macy's stores. Percentages of the sales supported the artists as well as the Souls Grown Deep Foundation.

== Exhibitions ==
Mingo's quilts have been included in museum and gallery exhibitions throughout the United States, including:

- The Museum of Fine Arts, Houston (2002, 2006)
- Whitney Museum of American Art (2003)
- Mobile Museum of Art (2003)
- Milwaukee Art Museum (2004)
- Corcoran Gallery of Art, Washington, D.C. (2004)
- Cleveland Museum of Art (2004)
- Chrysler Museum of Art (2005)
- Memphis Brooks Museum of Art (2005)
- Museum of Fine Arts, Boston (2005)
- Jule Collins Smith Museum of Fine Art at Auburn University (2005)
- High Museum of Art (2005)
- Indianapolis Museum of Art (2006)
- Orlando Museum of Art (2007)
- Walters Art Museum (2007)
- Tacoma Art Museum (2007)
- Speed Art Museum (2007–08)
- Denver Museum of Art (2008)
- Philadelphia Museum of Art (2008)
- Andrew Edlin Gallery (2018)
- Metropolitan Museum of Art (2018)
- LSU Museum of Art (2024)
- Oliver Art Center, Frankfort, Michigan (2025)

== Awards and honors ==
- Folk Arts Apprenticeship grant from the Alabama State Council on the Arts (2006)
- National Heritage Fellowship from the National Endowment of the Arts (2015)
