= Freedom Quilting Bee =

Quilting cooperative in Alabama, U.S.

The Freedom Quilting Bee (FQB) was a quilting cooperative based in Wilcox County, Alabama, that operated from 1966 until 2012. Originally begun by African American women to generate income, some of the Bee's quilts were displayed in the Smithsonian Institution.

== History ==
The Freedom Quilting Bee was a quilting cooperative with members located throughout the Black Belt of Alabama. Black women created the cooperative in 1966 to generate income for their families.

In December 1965, the Episcopal priest Francis X. Walter was in Wilcox County when a quilt on a clothesline outside a small home caught his eye. He had long been fascinated by American folk art and was interested in the quilt's bold design. The women began selling their quilts to Walter, who purchased them for $10 each. Walter was a priest who was returning to the area as part of the Selma Inter-religious Project. He received a $700 grant and traveled through the Black Belt, looking for quilts that a friend of his would sell in New York at auction. In the early stages, before the Freedom Quilting Bee was fully formed, quilts were sometimes made for sale in New York, while others came from the quilters' own beds or even family heirloom quilts from storage closets, sold to Father Walter because of the need for money for their families. Originally, Father Walter intended on using the majority of the extra money earned from the quilts once they were sold at auction to fund the Wilcox Southern Christian Leadership Conference (SCLC), and the remainder to be paid to the quilters themselves. Upon reflection, Father Walter noticed that there could be a need for a quilting co-operative, and he decided that the artists themselves should receive the money from the auctions.

After the first auction in New York City, the quilts gained critical acclaim and popularity, prompting the craftswomen to organize an official quilting cooperative. Thus, the Freedom Quilting Bee was formed, and more than 60 quilters attended their first meeting in a local church in March 1966. As an alternative economic organization, the Freedom Quilting Bee is part of a history of collective economic work of Black Americans. These alternative economics were used to raise the socioeconomic status of poor Black communities by allowing them to continue working in their own communities, while also reaching people across the country with their art. During the late 1960s and 1970s, the cooperative changed its operations to increase profits through a more mass-market oriented model. New Yorker Stanley Selengut was hired as the industrial development consultant. Working for travel expenses alone, he brought their quilts to New York City and helped the cooperative make deals with Bloomingdales and Sears.

On March 8, 1969, the Bee began construction on the Martin Luther King Jr. Memorial Sewing Center, designed by architect Martin Stein gratis and funded by small philanthropic foundations and through an interest-free loan from the American Friends Service Committee in Atlanta. The 4500-square-foot building was constructed by the husbands of the quiltmakers and other nonprofessional workers because the project only had funds to pay one skilled builder. Finding a property to buy was difficult, because Southern whites refused to sell to Black people. The sale of the land to the Bee's members had been so unlikely that they bought all they could, 17 acres, with plans to resell parcels to other Black people, who were largely shut out of the real estate market.

In 1970, Reverend Xavier found a white Catholic nun, Sister Catherine Martin, to help with office duties such as typing, invoicing, and bookkeeping twice a week. Martin helped the Bee establish a system in which the women were paid for piecework they did on the Bee's larger contracts. Some of the women had never had an opportunity to be paid for their labor prior to this; the Bee's payments enabled them to raise the standard of living for themselves and their families.

In the early 1970s, Mary Boykin Robinson helped found, and became the director of, the Freedom Quilting Bee Daycare Center, which served the children of the mothers who worked for the Bee. The Daycare center was open from 1970–1996.

Membership in the Freedom Quilting Bee dwindled in the 1990s and the community space they used was damaged by weather. In 2012, a year after the last original board member died, the Bee officially closed. Although it is commonly confused with the Quilters of Gee's Bend, the Freedom Quilting Bee was a separate organization with a similar mission and overlapping membership.

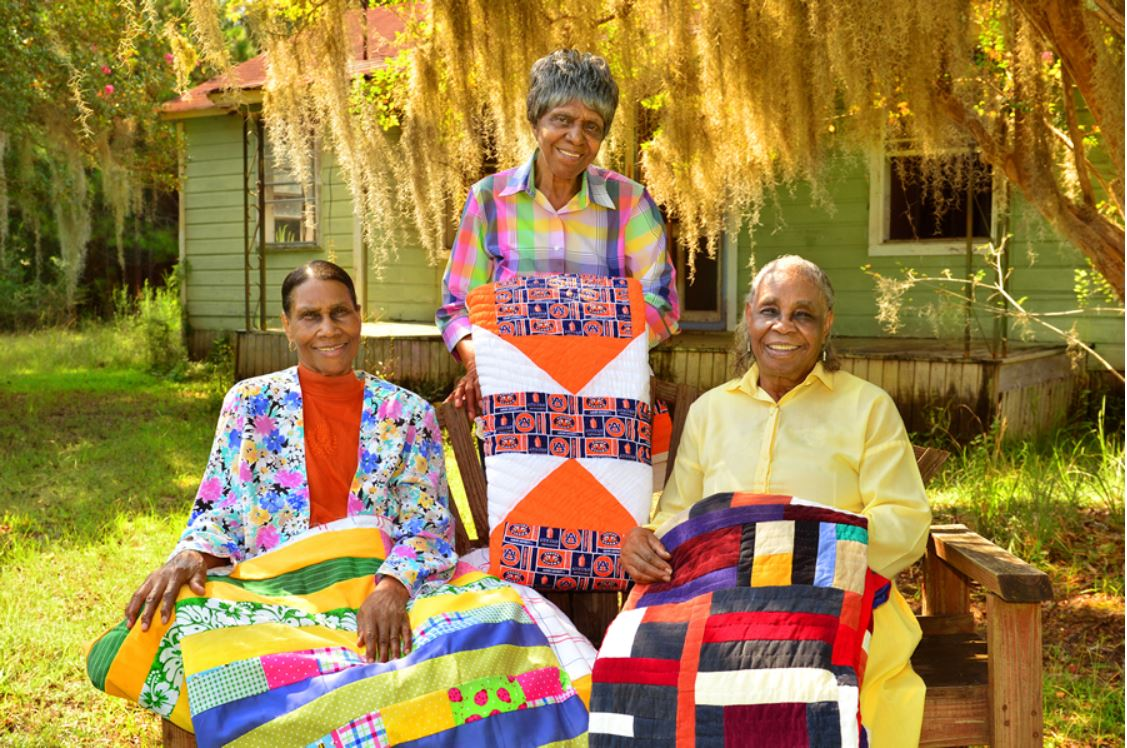
Mary Lee Bendolph, Loretta Pettway, and Lucy Mingo in 2015

Influential members of the Freedom Quilting Bee include Willie "Ma Willie" Abrams and her daughter, Estelle Witherspoon. Both women come from the town of Rehoboth, Alabama, which is ten miles north of Gee's Bend and a hub for the Bee. Abrams, a talented quilter, produced many of the quilts sold, and was instrumental to the Bee in its formative years. Witherspoon, an influential political leader in Rehoboth, worked as the head manager of the organization for over twenty years. Other important founding members were Minder Pettway Coleman, Aolar Carson Mosely, Mattie Clark Ross, Mary Boykin Robinson, China Grove Myles, Lucy Marie Mingo, Nettie Pettway Young, and Polly Mooney Bennett. Mary Lee Bendolph of Gee's Bend also participated briefly.

== Artists of the Freedom Quilting Bee ==
=== Minder Pettway Coleman ===
Mrs. Coleman was born in Wilcox County in October 1903, and lived just one mile from Gee's Bend in the Quilting Bee's hay day. Minder learned to quilt as a small child, and soon realized she had a knack for the art. Mrs. Coleman was a farmer her whole life, and also spent some years working at a cloth factory, and later an okra factory. While working at the cloth factory, she would collect the discarded scraps of fabric, and save them for use in her quilts. She also frequently used flour and fertilizer sack fabric in her quilts.

Once she joined the Freedom Quilting Bee, she donated the scraps she had collected to her fellow quilting artists. Minder's most famous quilting style is the Double Wedding Ring; she also created her own pattern that resembled two eggplants joined together. Mrs. Coleman did not receive pay for her work for the Freedom Quilting Bee Co-operative, nor did she receive money for the sale of her quilts. She instead gave the money to the Quilting Bee to be used for the creation of a new center for the quilters. Mrs. Coleman continued to work full-time for the Bee until 1978 when her husband became ill, and subsequently died later that same year.

=== Aolar Carson Mosely ===
Born in May 1912, Aolar learned to sew at the young age of eleven, when she sewed a dress for herself that her mother had cut out to be sewn. Aolar used a sewing machine both then, and when she quilted. It wasn't until the age of twelve though that Aolar made her first quilt. Aolar's mother was a quilter herself; as a small child Aolar along with her siblings helped collect the materials for her mother to use as quilting frames. They would collect the wood from nearby forests, and their father would fashion them into the quilting frames. Aolar was unable to finish school past fifth-grade as her family was unable to afford to send her. Aolar married Wisdom Mosely, a farmer, in 1929 at age seventeen. Together they had seventeen children, only thirteen of whom survived childhood.

While Aolar did quilt herself, much of her contributions to the Bee involved managing and tutoring others. She also contributed by making meals for the co-op members, and by completing small tasks such as framing quilts. Mrs. Mosely worked at the co-op until 1981; after this point she continued to work at the sewing center as a volunteer. In the fall of 1984, Mrs. Mosely's home burned to the ground, destroying all of her belongings and remaining quilts. However, within a few months, her grandson, a brick mason, re-built her a home on the same land as a gift to his grandmother, who had sponsored his education.

=== Mattie Clark Ross ===
Mattie Ross was described as a farmer, quilter, a choir member at Oak Groves Baptist Church, and a civil rights activist. In addition to all these things, Mattie was also the Freedom Quilting Bee's treasurer. Mattie quilted in many different styles including the Missouri Star, and a pattern known as the Double T.

=== China Grove Myles ===
Miss China Groves Myles was born in 1888 in Gee's Bend, Alabama. She sewed well into her eighties, and was one of the few still left in Gee's Bend who knew how to sew the complicated Pine Burr quilt pattern. In 1966 China Grove accompanied Estelle Witherspoon, Witherspoon's mother Willie Abrams, Father Walter and two others to the Mobile Art Gallery where one of Miss Miley's quilts was being displayed.

=== Lucy Marie Mingo ===
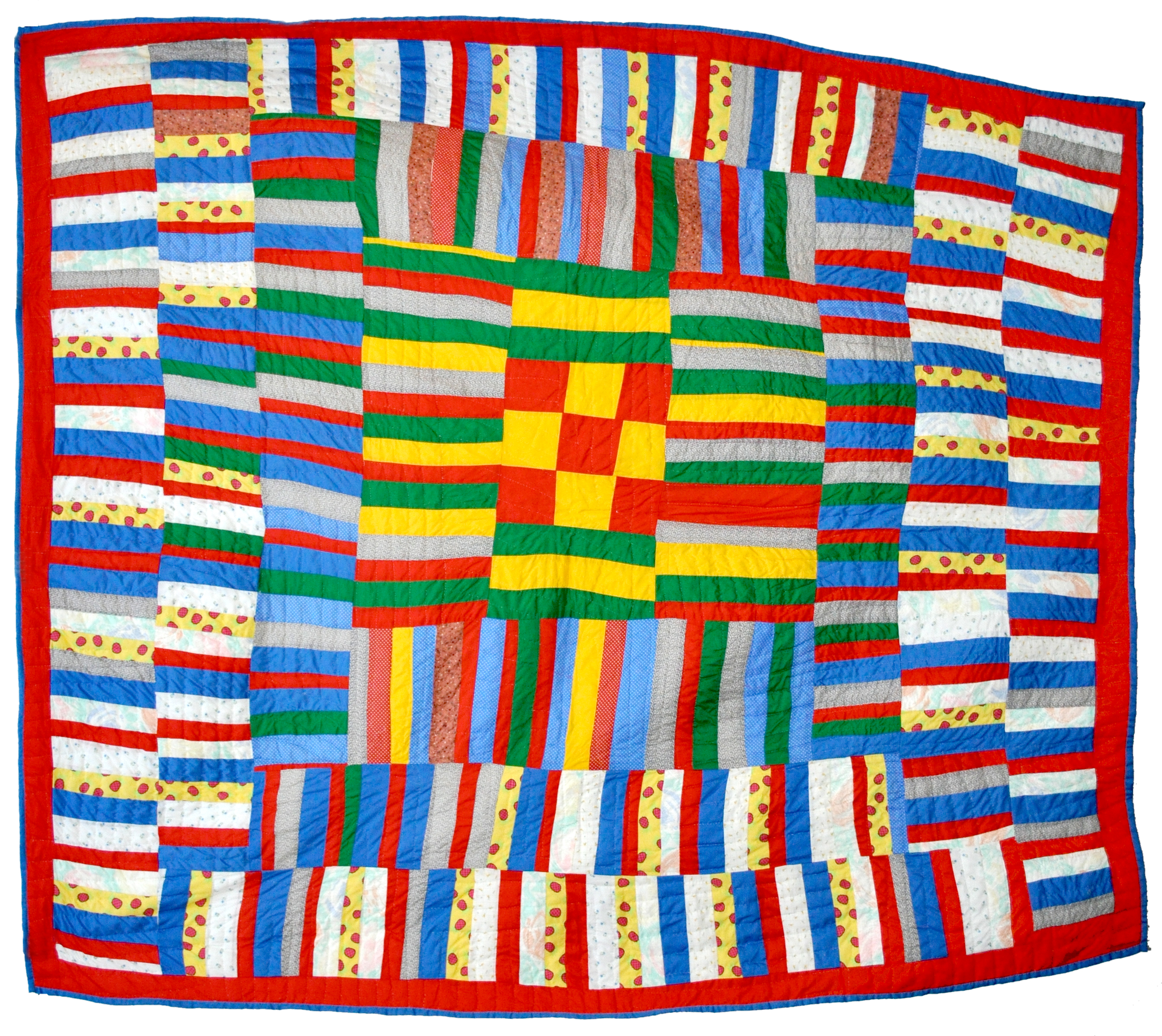
Pieced Quilt by Lucy Mingo

Lucy Mingo is from a long line of quilters. She never worked at the center itself, but created quilts in her off hours at her home in Gee's Bend. Lucy learned how to piece quilts at age fourteen, but did not actually sew one in totality until she was married in 1949. Lucy also sews the Pine Burr pattern that was taught to her by her aunt through marriage, China Groves Myles. One example of a Lucy Mingo quilt contains 90 blocks, each containing 265 pieces, which totals 23,850 individually sewn pieces.

=== Nettie Pettway Young ===
Nettie Young was born in 1916 to a father who had been a slave in Alabama, though Nettie herself was born free. Nettie's father was a farmer once he gained his freedom, and she grew up there on the farm he rented. Nettie only attended around eight months of school in her life because the family could not afford to send her or her siblings. In the 1960s, Nettie took part in the civil rights movement, and was even arrested for her participation in them. Nettie was a co-manager and quilter starting at the very beginning of the Freedom Quilting Bee's existence. Nettie married Clint Young around 1934, and the couple had eleven children. One of Nettie's favorite quilt patterns is reported to be the "bricklayer" pattern.

=== Polly Mooney Bennett ===
Polly Bennett was born in Gee's Bend in 1922. When she was six years old, her parents separated and left her in the care of her grandmother, Mary Brown Mooney. Mary Mooney was a tenant farmer, and Polly helped on the farm starting at a young age. Polly was able to attend a school in Boiling Springs, but was no longer able to attend after grade six. Bennett was involved with the Bee starting in its early stages.

=== "Ma" Willie Abrams ===
"Ma Willie" was born in 1897 in Wilcox County Alabama, where she was raised by her grandmother. "Ma" Willie was one of the oldest participating members until her death in 1987. She began quilting at the age of twelve, with the guidance of her grandmother. While she did know how to use a sewing machine, she normally chose to work by hand. "Ma" Willie and her husband, Eugene Abrams, were tenant farmers up until the Quilting Bee provided them with an alternative way to earn a living. "Ma" Willie would mostly craft bonnets for the Bee, which were to be sold for $2 each. When "Ma" Willie did quilt, she preferred to do so at her own home instead of at the sewing center, often choosing to sew on her front porch. Some of "Ma" Willie's quilts are in the permanent collection of The Metropolitan Museum of Art and the Fine Arts Museum of San Francisco.

=== Estelle Abrams Witherspoon ===
Estelle Witherspoon, born in January 1916, was the only daughter of "Ma" Willie Abrams. Estelle was one of the founding members of the Freedom Quilting Bee, and was its spokesperson since its inception. Estelle also has an extensive background in civil rights activism, working to achieve voting rights, and later working as a poll worker. She also participated in a march in 1971 calling for desegregation in Wilcox county schools.

== Quilts ==
The Bee quilts were stitched from scraps of cloth using patterns reflective of the history of Black quilting in the area. Some of these patterns included the Nine Patch, Monkey Wrench, the Lock and Key, Pine Burr, Missouri Star, The Bricklayer, Gentleman's Bow Tie, The Chestnut Bud, Grandmother's Choice, Grandmother's Dream, Snowball, and a pattern known as the Double T. The craft was usually learned from a mother or grandmother. Some of the scraps of cloth even came from old denim clothes that were too old to continue wearing in the cotton fields.

== Exhibitions ==
- "Revelations: Art from the African American South." – De Young Museum. June 3 to April 1, 2018.
- "Gee's Bend: The Architecture of the Quilt." – Museum of Fine Arts, Houston. June 4 to September 4, 2006.
- "The Quilts of Gee's Bend." – Museum of Fine Arts, Houston. September 6 to November 10, 2002.
- "The Quilts of Gee's Bend." – Whitney Museum of American Art. November 21, 2002, to March 9, 2003.
- "The Quilts of Gee's Bend." – Mobile Museum of Art. June 14 to August 31, 2003.
- "The Quilts of Gee's Bend." – Milwaukee Art Museum. September 27, 2003, to January 4, 2004.
- "The Quilts of Gee's Bend." – Corcoran Gallery of Art. February 14 to May 17, 2004.
- "The Quilts of Gee's Bend." – Cleveland Museum of Art. June 27 to September 12, 2004.
- "The Quilts of Gee's Bend." – Chrysler Museum of Art. October 15, 2004, to January 2, 2005.
- "The Quilts of Gee's Bend." – Memphis Brooks Museum of Art. February 13 to May 8, 2005.
- "The Quilts of Gee's Bend." – Museum of Fine Arts, Boston. June 1 to August 21, 2005.
- "The Quilts of Gee's Bend." – The Jule Collins Smith Museum of Fine Art at Auburn University. September 11 to December 4, 2005.
- "The Quilts of Gee's Bend." – High Museum of Art. March 25 to June 18, 2006.
- "The Quilts of Gee's Bend." – Fine Arts Museum of San Francisco, M. H. De Young Memorial Museum. July 15 to November 12, 2006.
- "Gee's Bend: The Architecture of a Quilt." – Orlando Museum of Art. January 28 to April 22, 2007.
- "Gee's Bend: The Architecture of a Quilt." -Walters Art Museum. June 17 to August 26, 2008.
- "The Quilts of Gee's Bend." – Museum of Art Fort Lauderdale. September 6, 2007, to January 7, 2008.
- "Gee's Bend: The Architecture of a Quilt." – Denver Museum of Art. April 13 to July 6, 2008.
- "Gee's Bend: The Architecture of a Quilt." – Philadelphia Museum of Art. August 2 to October 2, 2008.
- "Souls Grown Deep: Artists of the African American South" -Philadelphia Museum of Art, June 8 – September 2, 2019.
- "Cosmologies from the Tree of Life: Art from the African American South" -Virginia Museum of Fine Arts, June 8 – November 17, 2019.
- "Creation Story: Gee's Bend Quilts and the Art of Thornton Dial" – Frist center for the visual arts, May 25 – September 2, 2012.
- "Gee's Bend: the Architecture of the Quilt" – Museum of Fine Arts, Houston, June 4 – September 4, 2006."The Quilts of Gee's Bend" – Museum of Fine Arts, Houston, September 4 – November 10, 2002.
- "Living Legacies: Art of the African American South." – Toledo Museum of Art. – January 15 to May 1, 2022.
- "Radical Tradition: American Quilts and Social Change." – Toledo Museum of Art. – November 21, 2020, to February 14, 2021.

== Critical acclaim ==
After the first auction in New York City, the Bee quilts were picked up by Vogue and Bloomingdale's. When the art world began to take notice of the quilts, they ended up in an exhibition in the Smithsonian. A New York Times review called the quilts "some of the most miraculous works of modern art America has produced." The quilts have been compared to 20th century abstract styles, which are much different than the common orderly American quilting styles.
