= Boykin, Alabama =

- Unincorporated community Census-designated place
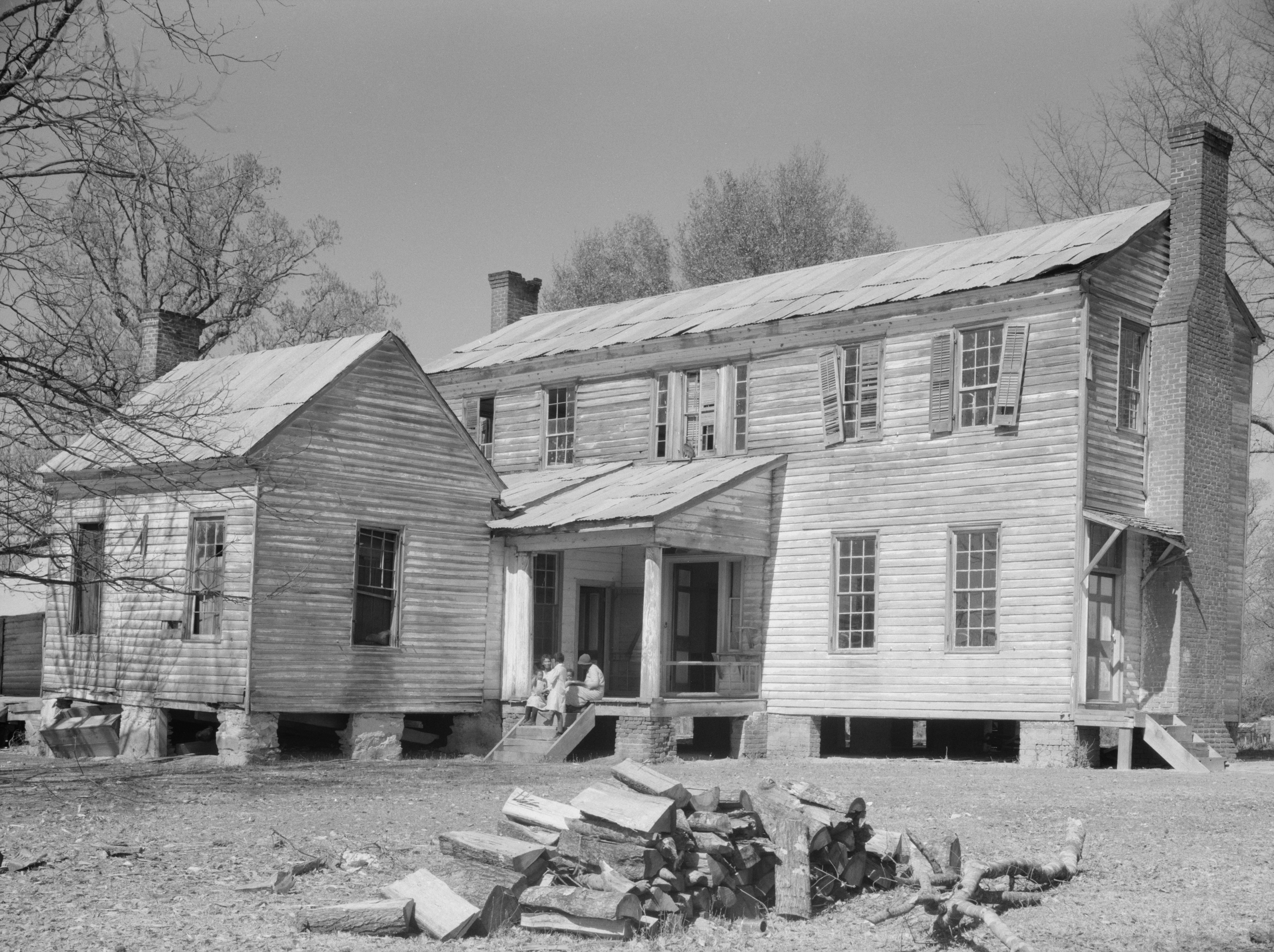
- Rear view of the detached kitchen and former plantation home of the Mark Pettway family, called Sandyridge, in Boykin April 1937. The house was demolished a short time later. Photographed by Arthur Rothstein.

- Location of Boykin in Wilcox County, Alabama.
- Coordinates: 32°04′10″N 87°17′29″W
- Country: United States
- State: Alabama
- County: Wilcox

Area
  - Total: 2.81 sq mi (7.27 km^{2})
  - Land: 2.80 sq mi (7.24 km^{2})
  - Water: 0.012 sq mi (0.03 km^{2})
- Elevation: 197 ft (60 m)

Population (2020)
  - Total: 208
  - Density: 74.4/sq mi (28.73/km^{2})
- Time zone: UTC-6 (Central (CST))
  - Summer (DST): UTC-5 (CDT)
- ZIP code: 36723
- Area code: 334
- FIPS code: 01-08680
- GNIS feature ID: 2628580

Boykin, also known as Gee's Bend, is an African American majority community and census-designated place in a large bend of the Alabama River in Wilcox County, Alabama. As of the 2020 census, its population was 208. The Boykin Post Office was established in the community in 1949 and remains active, servicing the 36723 ZIP code.

Gee's Bend was named for Joseph Gee, an early large land owner from Halifax County, North Carolina who settled here in 1816. Gee brought 18 African American slaves with him and established a cotton plantation within the bend.

== Demographics ==
Historical population
Census	Pop.	Note	%±
2010	275		—
2020	208		−24.4%
U.S. Decennial Census; 2010 2020

Boyki was first listed as a census designated place in the 2010 U.S. census.

=== 2020 census ===
Boykin CDP, Alabama – Racial and ethnic composition Note: the US Census treats Hispanic/Latino as an ethnic category. This table excludes Latinos from the racial categories and assigns them to a separate category. Hispanics/Latinos may be of any race.
Race / Ethnicity (NH = Non-Hispanic)	Pop 2010	Pop 2020	% 2010	% 2020
White alone (NH)	11	5	4.00%	2.40%
Black or African American alone (NH)	262	195	95.27%	93.75%
Native American or Alaska Native alone (NH)	0	1	0.00%	0.48%
Asian alone (NH)	0	0	0.00%	0.00%
Native Hawaiian or Pacific Islander alone (NH)	0	0	0.00%	0.00%
Other race alone (NH)	0	1	0.00%	0.48%
Mixed race or Multiracial (NH)	0	1	0.00%	0.48%
Hispanic or Latino (any race)	2	5	0.73%	2.40%
Total	275	208	100.00%	100.00%

== History ==
Boykin is a block of land enclosed on three sides by the Alabama River, within a horseshoe shaped turn of the river named Gee's Bend. It is within the Black Belt of Alabama. The plantation started by Joseph Gee passed to his nephews Sterling and Charles Gee upon his death, along with 47 slaves. The brothers then sold it to their relative Mark H. Pettway in 1845 to settle a $29,000 debt. About a year later, the Pettway family moved from North Carolina to Gee's Bend, bringing about 100 slaves with them. When slavery was abolished many of them continued working for the Pettways as sharecroppers. Many of the black tenants Arthur Rothstein photographed were named Pettway. The white Pettway family owned the property until 1895, when it was sold to Adrian Sebastian Van de Graaff. Van de Graaff, a lawyer from Tuscaloosa, then operated it as an absentee landlord.

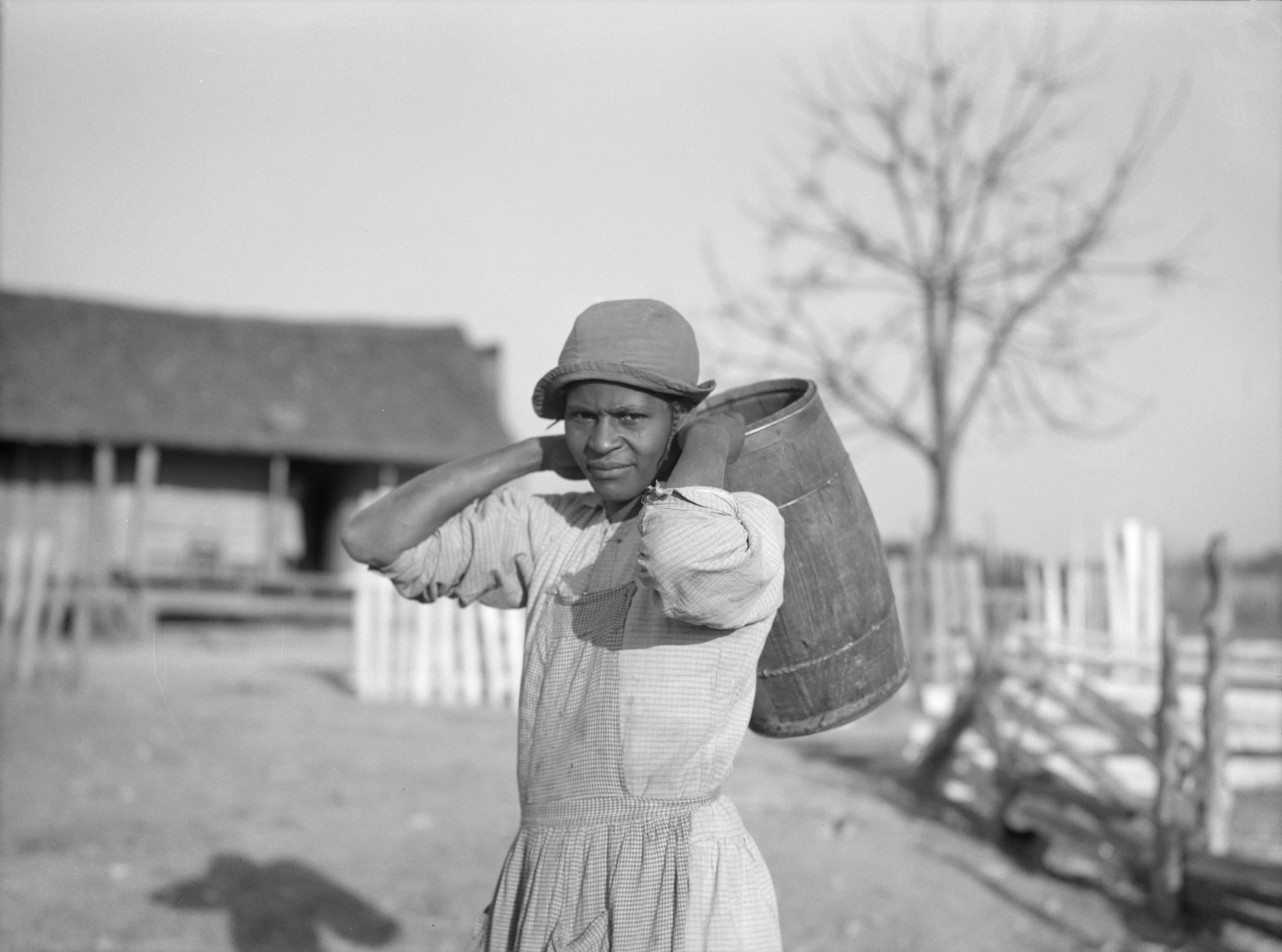
Annie Pettway Bendolph carrying water, 1937. Photo by Arthur Rothstein.

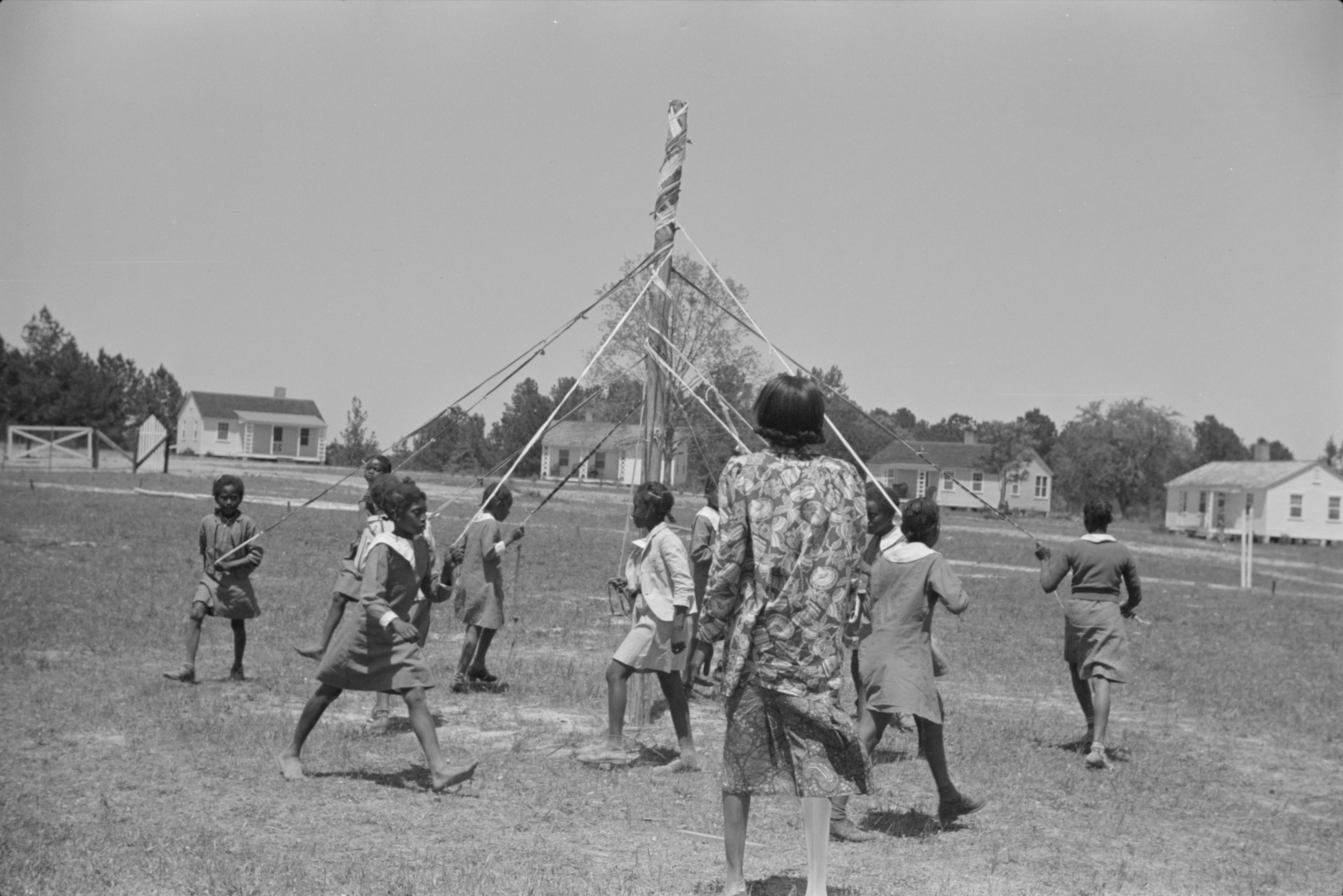
Children rehearsing around a maypole for health day exercises, 1939. Photo by Marion Post Wolcott.

The Resettlement Administration reports of the 1930s emphasized the isolation of the community, describing the unreliable ferry that approached from the east and the muddy road that entered from the west. The community had received public assistance from the Red Cross in 1932 and federal and state aid in 1933 and 1934. Beginning in 1935, the Resettlement Administration made agricultural loans and offered farm and home management advice. In 1937, the average rural rehabilitation loan to Gee's Bend families was $353.41, and the agency reports speak of possible cooperative undertakings; a building campaign for houses, barns, a schoolhouse, and a sawmill. Residents were also encouraged to replace oxen with more efficient mules.

The agency's programs at Gee's Bend continued after Rothstein's visit. During 1937, the agency purchased the old Pettway plantation, and two adjacent farms, totalling over 10,000 acres, for $122,000. The agency then sub-divided the land and rented it to 92 families. The following year, a nurse began working in the community, and construction began for a school, store, blacksmith shop, and cooperative cotton gin. By 1939 enough visible change had occurred for Roy Stryker to send Marion Post Wolcott to the community to photograph the signs of progress—to get the "after" pictures. During the 1940s, many families at Gee's Bend bought their farms from the government for an average of $1,400 each. This was about $2,600 less per farm than the 88 units had cost the government, a subsidy that seems to have been fairly typical for Farm Security Administration projects of this type.

Gee's Bend continued to fascinate outsiders. In 1941, New York City speech professor and folklore collector Robert Sonkin recorded music, recitations, discussion, and a Fourth of July program at Gee's Bend.

=== Ferry service ===
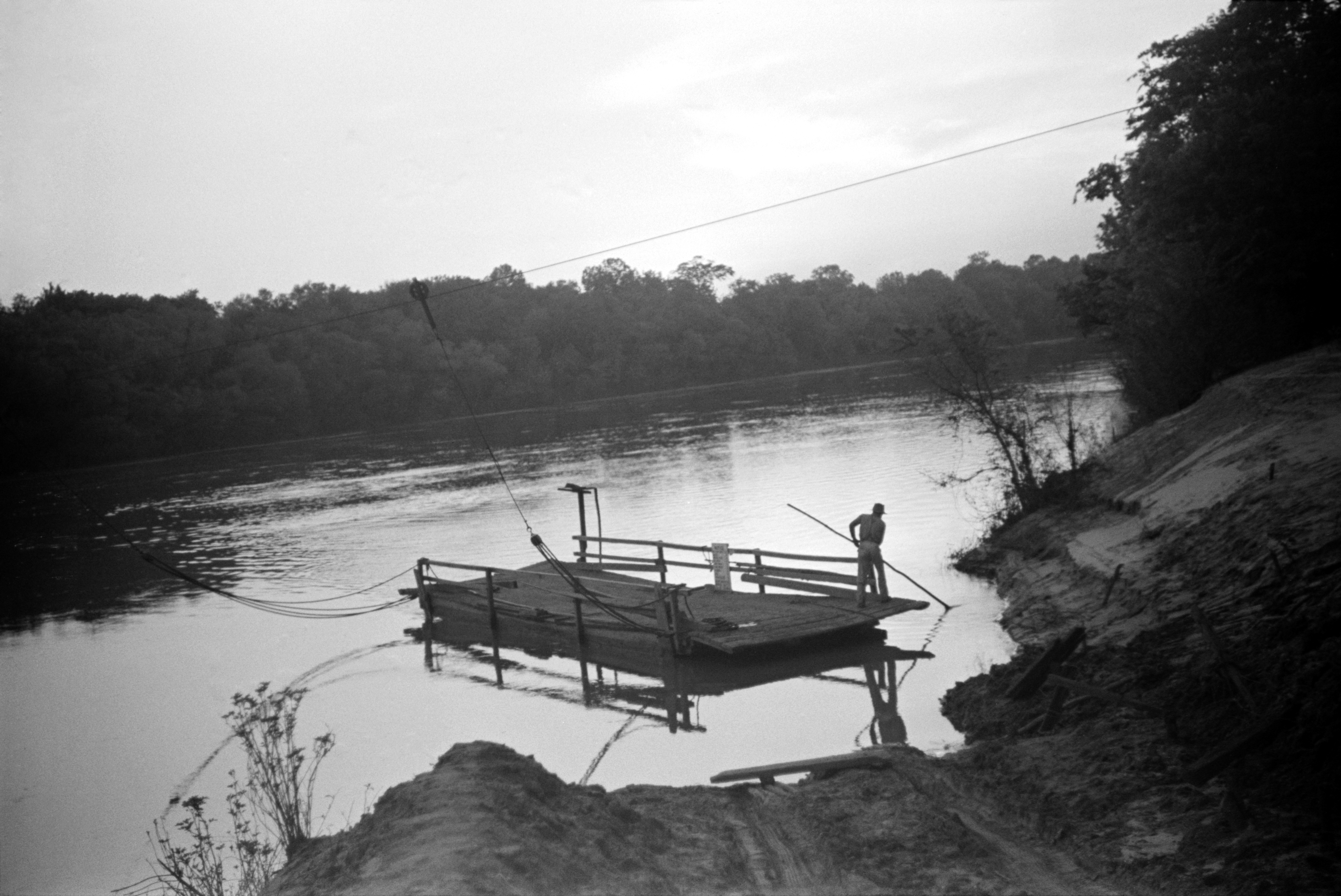
Old cable ferry between Camden and Gees Bend, 1939. Photo by Marion Post Wolcott.

Gee's Bend became an important part of the mid-1960s Freedom Quilting Bee, an offshoot of the Civil Rights Movement designed to boost family income and foster community development by selling handcrafts to outsiders. When large numbers of residents began taking the ferry to the county seat of Camden to try to register to vote, local authorities reacted by eliminating ferry service in 1962. The lack of ferry service forced the residents of the community to drive more than an hour in order to conduct business in Camden. The people of Gee's Bend would be without a ferry service for 44 years.

In the 1990s, Congress allocated money to pay for a ferry service and operating costs, but the project floundered when the Alabama Department of Transportation hired Hubert Bonner, a boat builder who had never built a ferry. Bonner's ferry, completed in 2004, got stuck on a sandbar and did not pass Coast Guard inspections. Alabama then hired Hornblower Marine Services, to rebuild the ferry that Bonner completed, fixing the problems to allow the ferry to pass the Coast Guard inspections. Hornblower completed retrofitting the ferry in May 2006. The ferry service began anew on September 18, 2006, after dredging of the route was completed. By 2020, the ferry carries up to 15 cars and 132 passengers, and its diesel propulsion system has been replaced by electric motors and 270 kWh batteries being recharged at the docks.

- Link to Google's Maps page showing the routes between Camden and the Gee's Bend community

=== Gee's Bend Quilts ===
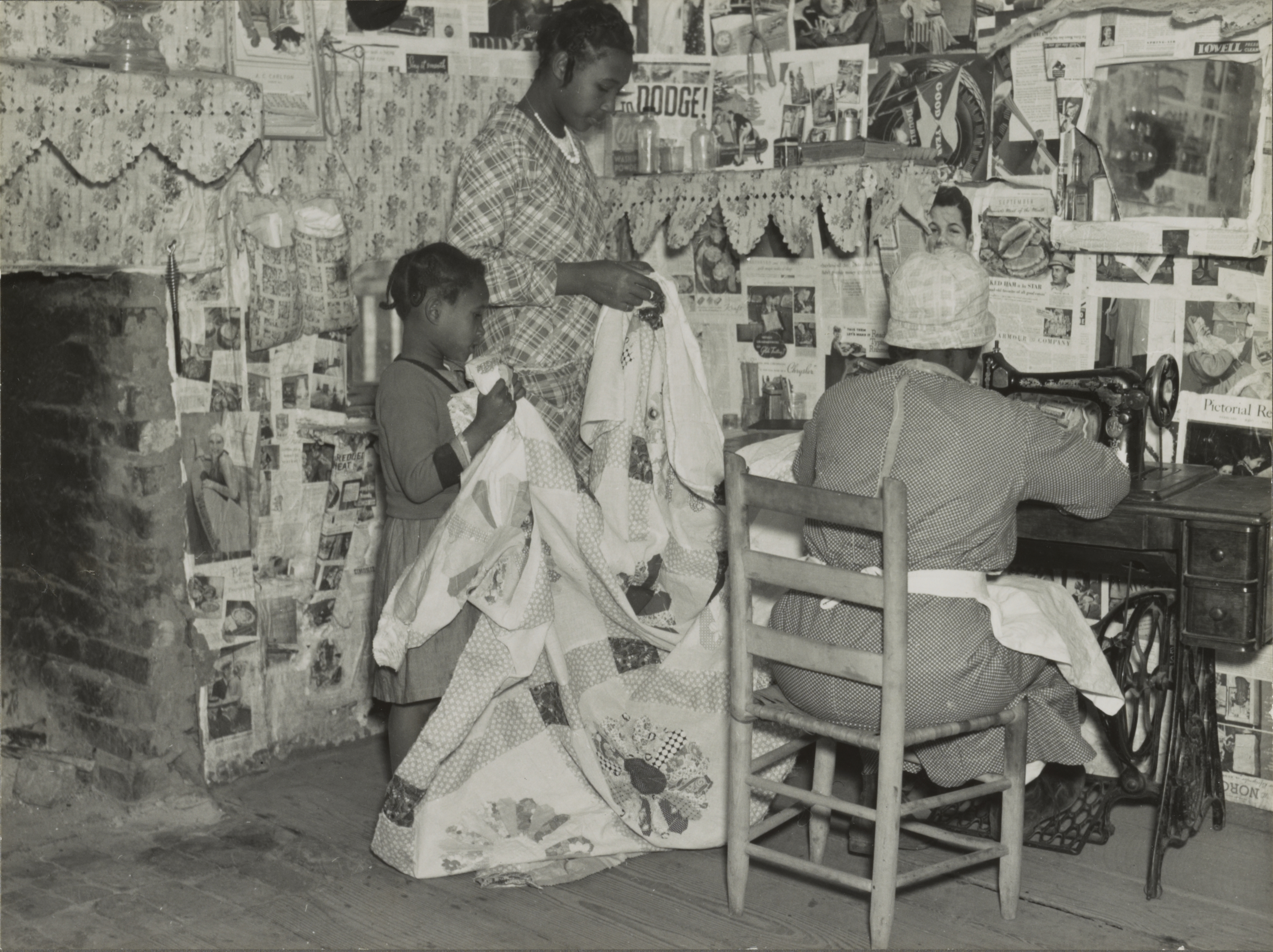
Jennie Pettway and another girl with the quilter Jorena Pettway, 1937. Photo by Arthur Rothstein.

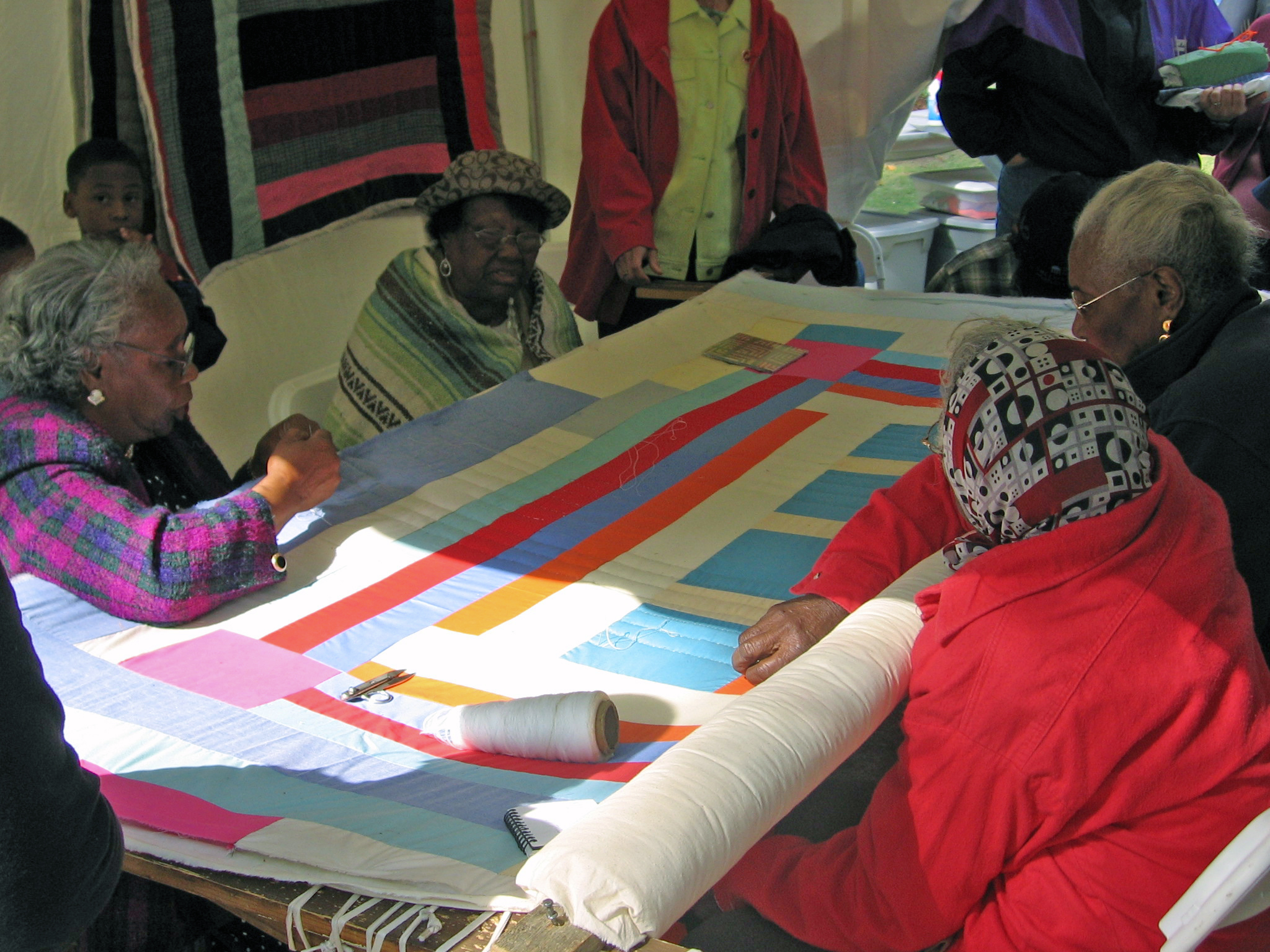
Women of Gee's Bend quilting, 2005.

Calvin Trillin devoted a 1969 The New Yorker piece to the opening of the community's new sewing center, paid for with quilting bee revenues. In 1983, an exhibit in Birmingham sponsored by the Alabama Humanities Foundation included several of Rothstein's photographs of Gee's Bend, and an oral history project at the Birmingham Public Library sent new researchers and a photographer to document a new generation of residents. Nevertheless, the residents themselves have expressed some doubt that the attention they have received has improved their lot in life. In 1985, local historian Kathryn Tucker Windham reported: "They say, 'Ain't nothing ever happened.'"

In 2002, an exhibition of their art work opened at the Museum of Fine Arts, Houston, organized by the Tinwood Alliance. The show went to the Whitney Museum in New York City and their art was hailed as "some of the most miraculous work of art America has produced." The show subsequently traveled to numerous other museums and the women have found gallery representation for their art. In June 2006, a second exhibition of quilts opened at the Museum of Fine Arts, Houston, also organized by the Tinwood Alliance, called "Gee's Bend: The Architecture of the Quilt." It traveled to seven additional museums, including the Smithsonian, the final stop of the nationwide tour was the Philadelphia Museum of Art at the end of 2008. Many of the quilt makers have become well known and have traveled extensively to talk about their community and their art. Many now have real incomes for the first time and their work, and its success, has helped to reunite and revive a dying community. In August 2006, the United States Postal Service released a sheet of 10 commemorative stamps bearing images of Gee's Bend quilts sewn between c.1940 and 2001. The quilts and quilters are featured at their website.

==== Quilters lawsuits ====
In 2007 two members of the Gee's Bend quilting community filed lawsuits in US Federal Court in Selma, Alabama. The suit filed by Annie Mae Young alleged that dealers falsely claim to own the intellectual property rights to quilts made in Gee's Bend before 1984, including her work. They also improperly used her name and image to promote sales, the lawsuit alleges. The suit filed by Loretta Pettway, claims "gross exploitation" at the hands of several defendants. Both suits also list as defendants Kathy Ireland Worldwide who have licensed the designs from some of the famous quilts for use in Kathy Ireland products.

Kathy Ireland Worldwide defends their handling of the Gee's Bend quilter's royalties in a statement on their website:

Our agreement assures us that the quilter’s representatives are the proper place to send all quilt related earnings. This week a careful review of our files indicates that Kathy Ireland Worldwide has paid more to these representatives than our company has earned from the quilts project.

Other members of the quilters group are unhappy with the lawsuits and felt they are an attempt of some members to go out on their own.

U.S. District Judge Callie Granade of Mobile dismissed the suits and said the parties would pay their own legal costs.

== Education ==
The sole school district in the county is the Wilcox County School District. The sole comprehensive high school of the district is Wilcox Central High School.

== Notable people ==
- Polly Bennett, quilter
- Robert Petway, blues singer and guitarist

== See also ==
- J.R. Moehringer
- Arthur Rothstein
- Robert Sonkin
