= Quilts of Gee's Bend =

Quilting tradition of Gee's Bend, Alabama

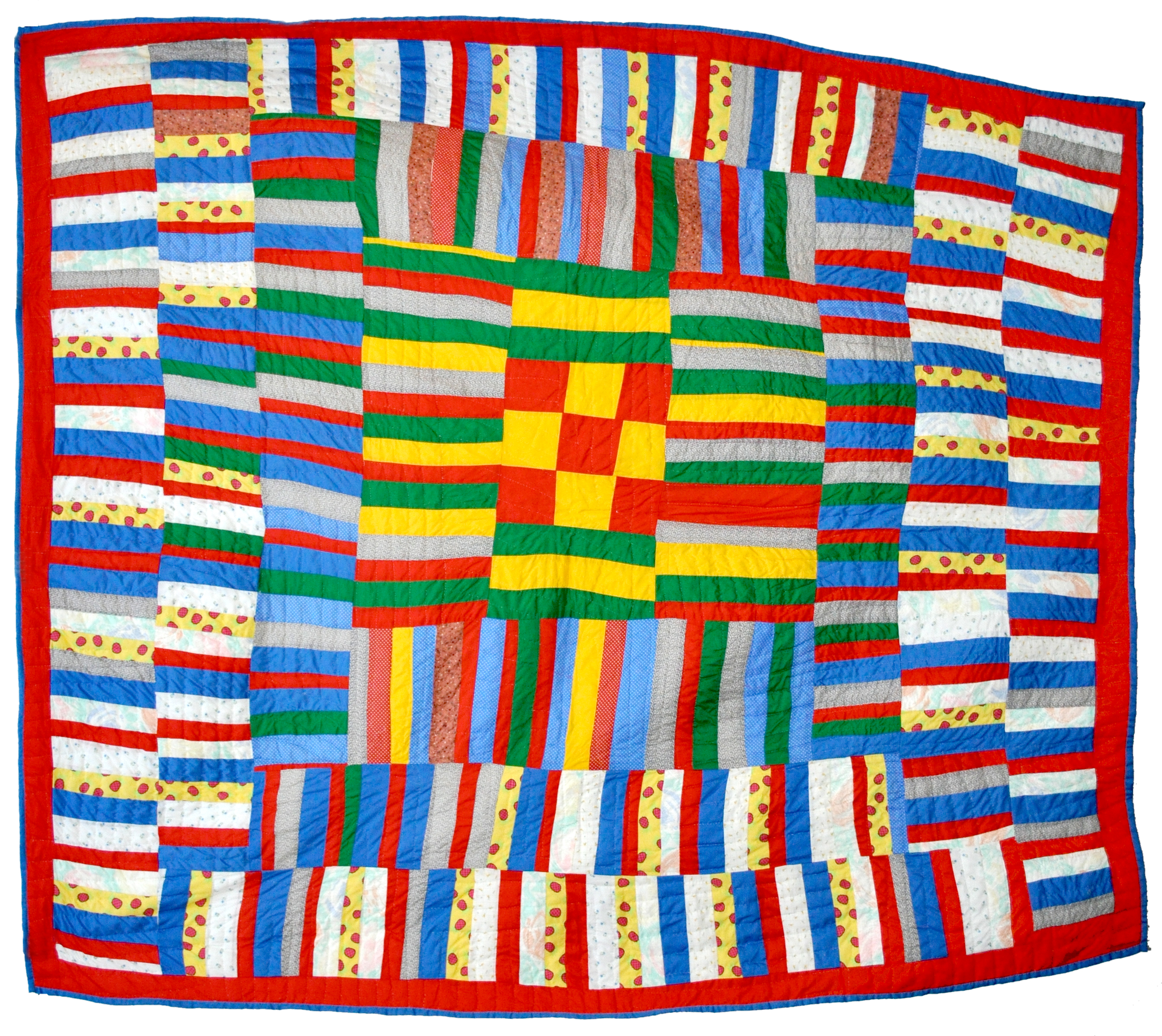
A 1979 quilt by Lucy Mingo of Gee's Bend, Alabama. It includes a nine-patch center block surrounded by pieced strips.

The quilts of Gee's Bend are quilts created by a group of women and their ancestors who live or have lived in the isolated African-American hamlet of Gee's Bend, Alabama, along the Alabama River.

The quilting tradition can be dated back to the nineteenth century and endures to this day. The residents of Gee's Bend, Alabama, are direct descendants of the enslaved people who worked the cotton plantation established in 1816 by Joseph Gee.

The quilts of Gee's Bend are among the most important African-American visual and cultural contributions to the history of art within the United States. The women of Gee's Bend have gained international attention and acclaim for their artistry, with exhibitions of Gee's Bend quilts held in museums and galleries across the United States and beyond. This recognition has, in turn, brought increased economic opportunities to the community.

== History ==
Gee's Bend (officially called Boykin) is an isolated, rural community of about seven hundred residents, southwest of Selma, in the Black Belt of Alabama. The area is named after Joseph Gee, a planter from North Carolina who acquired 6,000 acres of land and established a cotton plantation in 1816 with seventeen enslaved people. The Gee family operated the plantation until 1845, when, to settle significant debts, they relinquished ownership, including 98 enslaved people, to Mark H. Pettway, a relative, enslaver, and then sheriff of Halifax County, North Carolina. The following year, Pettway relocated to Gee's Bend, transporting his family and furnishings in a wagon train while 100 enslaved men, women, and children were forced to walk on foot from North Carolina to their new life in Alabama. Many members of the community still carry the Pettway name. After emancipation, many formerly enslaved people stayed on the plantation as sharecroppers, which left them perpetually in debt to the landowners.

As cotton prices fell throughout the 1920s, farmers in Gee's Bend were forced deeper into debt. In the summer of 1932, a Camden merchant who had been advancing credit to more than 60 families in the Bend died. When his estate foreclosed on their debts and raided Gee's Bend for anything of value, including livestock, farm equipment, and stored food, the impoverished community was driven into complete destitution.

In 1935, President Franklin D. Roosevelt established the Resettlement Administration, a New Deal federal agency which aimed to alleviate rural poverty. In 1937, the federal government pieced together and purchased the former Pettway plantation, some 10,000 acres of land. The Resettlement Administration and its successor, the Farm Security Administration, then provided low-interest loans to families in Gee's Bend to buy land and build houses.

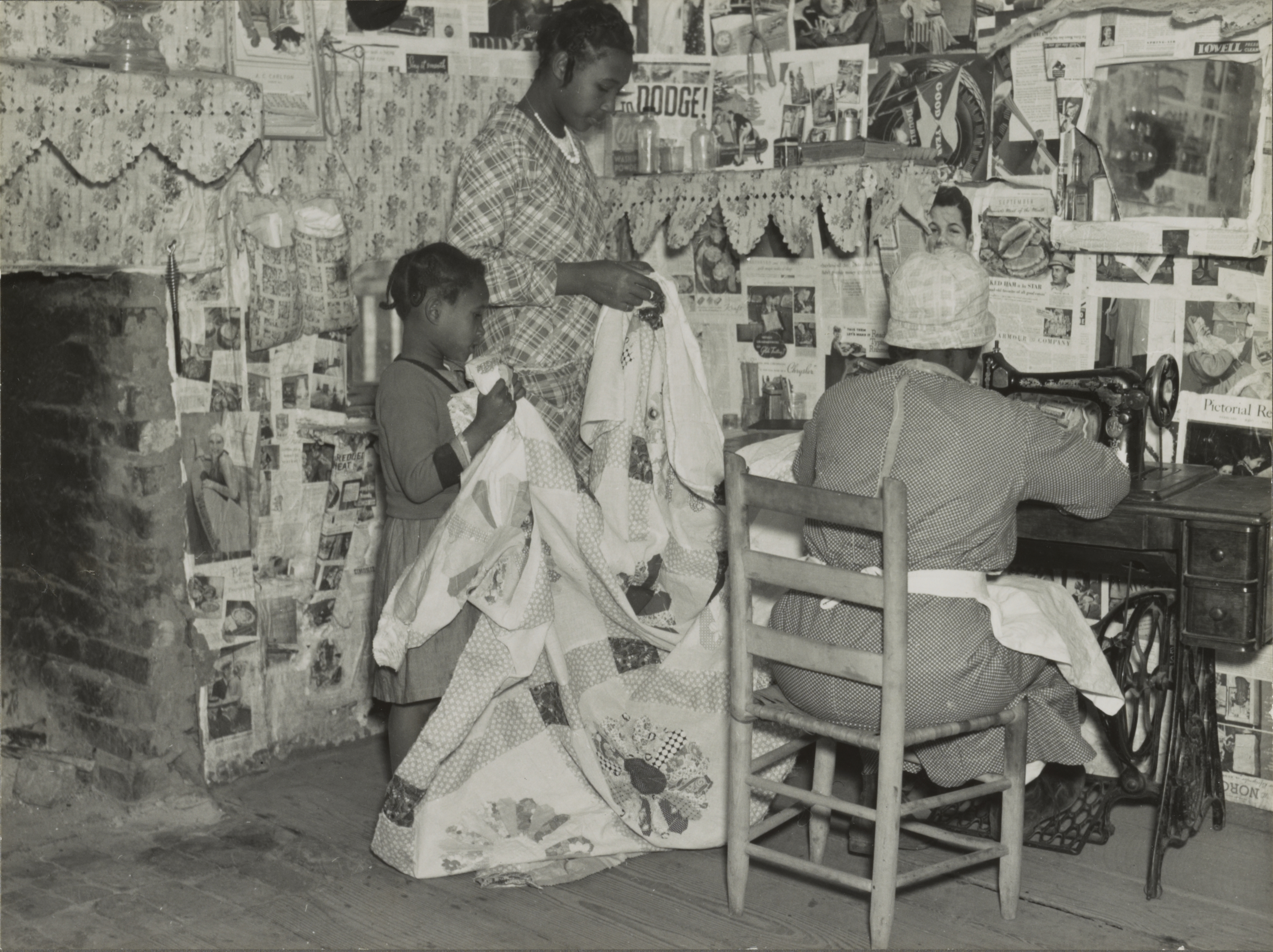
Jennie Pettway and another girl with the quilter Jorena Pettway, Gee's Bend 1937

A cooperative farming association called Gee's Bend Farms, Inc. was established by the federal government, and in the years that followed, a school, medical clinic, general store, warehouse, gristmill, and cotton gin were built, along with nearly 100 houses that residents could purchase with low-interest government loans. Through federal intervention, the residents of Gee's Bend therefore became landowners of the land worked by their enslaved forebears. Cultural traditions like quilt making were nourished by these continuities.

In the early 1960s, in response to members of the community's growing participation in the civil rights movement, white officials in the county seat of Camden discontinued ferry service to Gee's Bend, contributing to the community's isolation, cutting it off from basic services, and hindering members' ability to register to vote. Ferry service was not restored until 2006. In February 1965, Martin Luther King Jr. brought his civil rights campaign to Gee's Bend. At the time, no African-American had ever successfully registered to vote in Wilcox County, despite comprising nearly 80% of the population. Many quiltmakers in Gee's Bend braved the threat of violence to march with King in Camden in March 1965, including Aolar Mosely and her daughter Mary Lee Bendolph.

In March 1966, more than 60 quiltmakers from Gee's Bend, Alberta, and surrounding communities met in Camden's Antioch Baptist Church to found the Freedom Quilting Bee. The Bee, one of the few Black women's cooperatives in the United States, landed contracts with major retailers, such as Bloomingdale's and Sears, to produce made-to-order quilts and other quilted products, helping to inspire a national revival of interest in patchwork. It officially closed in 2012, a year after the death of its last original board member, Nettie Young.

== Twenty-first century ==
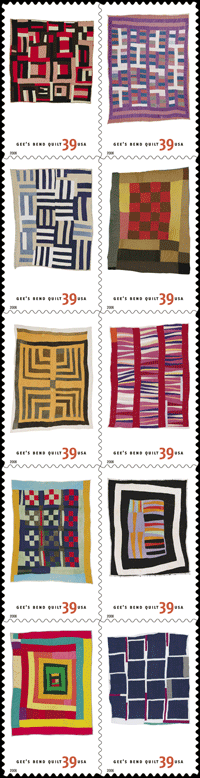
2006 US postage stamps

In 2002, the seminal exhibition "The Quilts of Gee's Bend", celebrating the artistic legacy of four generations of Gee's Bend quiltmakers, debuted at the Museum of Fine Arts, Houston. Hailed by the New York Times during its display at New York's Whitney Museum of American Art as "some of the most miraculous works of modern art America has produced," the quilts were displayed at 11 other museums nationwide. Since this first exhibition, Gee's Bend quilts have been exhibited in museums worldwide.

In 2003, more than 50 Gee's Bend quilt makers came together to form the Gee's Bend Quilters Collective to sell and market their works.

In August 2006, the United States Postal Service released a sheet of ten stamps commemorating Gee's Bend quilts sewn between c.1940 and 1998 as part of the American Treasures series.

In 2007, two Gee's Bend quiltmakers, Annie Mae Young and Loretta Pettway, filed lawsuits alleging that curator and art collector William Arnett cheated them out of thousands of dollars from the sales of their quilts. The lawsuit was resolved and dismissed without comment from lawyers on either side in 2008.

In 2015, Gee's Bend quilters Mary Lee Bendolph, Lucy Mingo, and Loretta Pettway were joint recipients of a National Heritage Fellowship awarded by the National Endowment for the Arts, the United States government's highest honor in the folk and traditional arts.

Since 2022, the annual Airing of the Quilts Festival, which features quilt displays and sales, workshops, and guided tours, has attracted thousands of visitors to Gee's Bend.

== Quilts ==
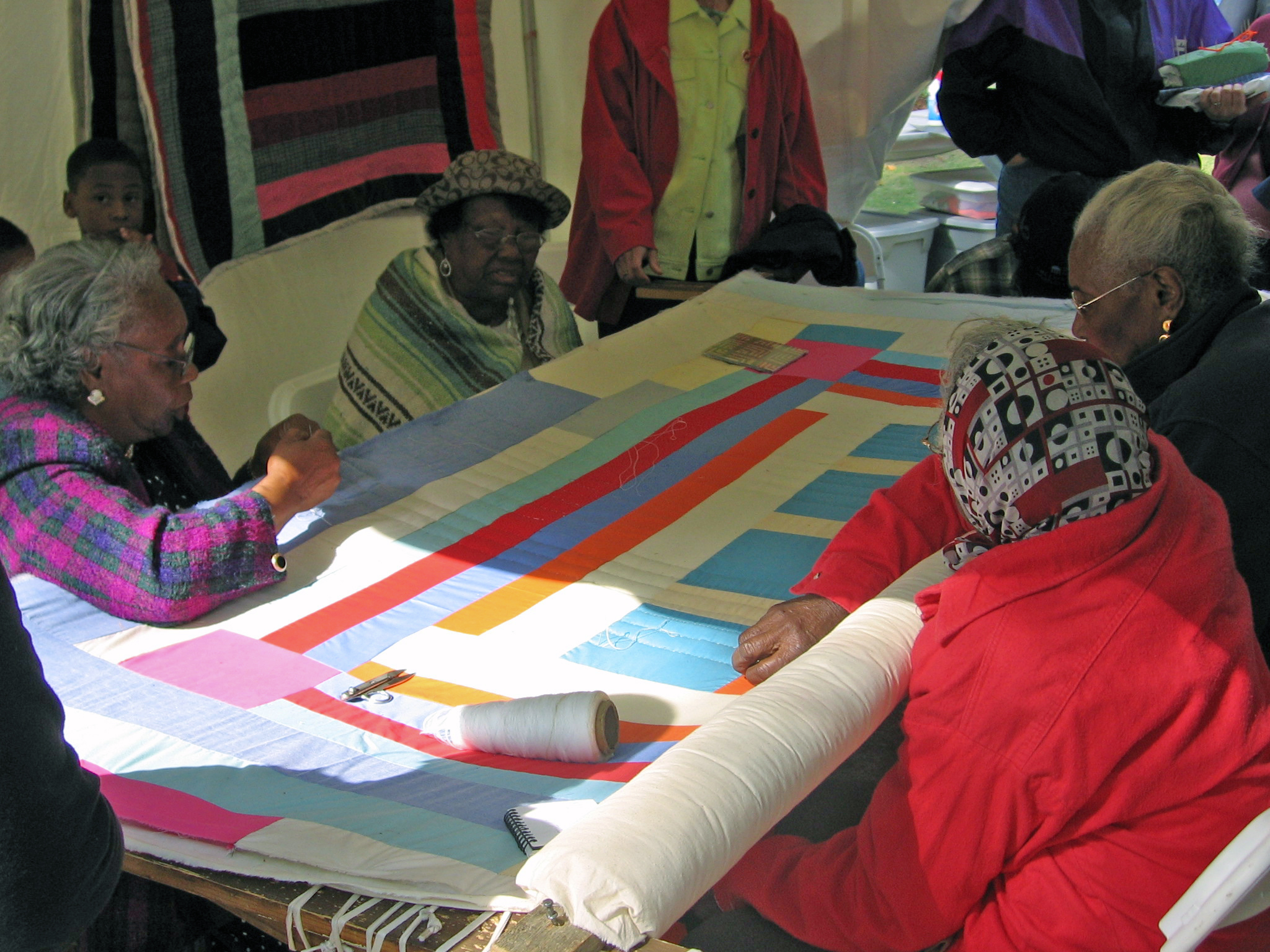
Women from Gee's Bend work on a quilt, 2005.

Throughout the post-bellum years until the middle of the twentieth century, Gee's Bend women made quilts primarily to keep themselves and their families warm in unheated houses that lacked running water, telephones and electricity. Many quilts were also imbued with spiritual meaning, serving as a way to memorialize loved ones after their deaths.

Due to the scarcity of resources, the majority of early twentieth-century quilts were made out of old work-clothes and other used materials such as fertilizer and flour sacks. As a wider variety of cheap fabric became available in the second half of the twentieth century, work-clothes quilts became less prevalent. Nevertheless, frugality, the recycling of old materials, and commemoration continue to be central tenets of quilting in Gee's Bend.

The practice of reusing old materials has resulted in a proclivity for improvisational approaches to quilt design. Indeed, many Gee's Bend quilts can be called improvisational, or "my way" quilts as they are known locally, in which quiltmakers start with basic forms and then follow their own individual artistic paths ("their way") to stitch unexpected patterns, shapes, and colors. The transference of aesthetic knowledge and skills from generation to generation has been fundamental to the Gee's Bend quilting tradition for centuries.

== Public collections ==
In 2016, Souls Grown Deep began a process of transferring artworks from its collection into the permanent collections of museums worldwide, with the goal of diversifying museum collections and securing the place of Black artists from the American South in American art history. As of May 2024, Gee's Bend quilts are in the permanent collections of over 40 museums across three continents.

=== United States ===
- The National Gallery
- National Museum of African American History and Culture
- The Metropolitan Museum of Art
- Brooklyn Museum
- Studio Museum in Harlem
- New Orleans Museum of Art
- Hood Museum of Art
- Museum of Fine Arts, Boston
- Museum of Fine Arts, Houston
- Baltimore Museum of Art
- Dallas Museum of Art
- Ackland Art Museum
- Rhode Island School of Design Museum
- Indianapolis Museum of Art
- Currier Museum of Art
- Blanton Museum of Art
- Equal Justice Initiative
- Fine Arts Museum of San Francisco
- Montgomery Museum of Fine Arts
- The Alabama Department of Archives and History
- Virginia Museum of Fine Arts
- High Museum of Art
- Birmingham Museum of Art
- Asheville Art Museum
- Minneapolis Institute of Art
- The Contemporary Austin
- Des Moines Art Center
- Speed Art Museum
- Toledo Museum of Art
- Princeton University Art Museum
- The Phillips Collection
- de Young Museum
- Philadelphia Museum of Art
- Seattle Art Museum
- Henry Art Gallery, University of Washington
- Hampton University Museum
- Clark Atlanta University Art Museum
- Spelman College Museum of Fine Art

=== United Kingdom ===
- Tate Modern

=== Australia ===
- National Gallery of Victoria
- Art Gallery of New South Wales

== Selected exhibitions ==
- 2002 - 2008: The Quilts of Gee's Bend. Museum of Fine Arts, Houston, TX (Sept-Nov 2002); Whitney Museum of American Art, New York, NY (Nov 2002-Mar 2003); Mobile Art Museum, Mobile, AL (Jul-Aug 2003); Milwaukee Art Museum, Milwaukee, WI (Sept 2003-Jan 2004); Corcoran Gallery of Art, Washington, D.C. (Feb-May 2004); Cleveland Art Museum, Cleveland, OH (Jul-Sept 2004); Chrysler Museum of Art, Norfolk, VA (Oct 2004-Jan 2005); Memphis Brooks Museum of Art, Memphis, TN (Feb-May 2005); Museum of Fine Arts, Boston, MA (Jun-Aug 2005); Jule Collins Smith Museum of Fine Art at Auburn University, Auburn, AL (Sept-Dec 2005); High Museum of Art, Atlanta, GA (Mar-Jun 2006); de Young Museum, San Francisco, CA (Jul-Dec 2006); Museum of Art, Fort Lauderdale, FL (Sept 2007-Jan 2008).
- 2006 - 2008: Gee's Bend: The Architecture of the Quilt. Museum of Fine Arts, Houston, TX (Jun-Sept 2006); Indianapolis Museum of Art, Indianapolis, IN (Oct-Dec 2006); Orlando Museum of Art, Orlando, FL (Jan-Apr 2007); The Walters Art Museum, Baltimore, MD (Jun-Aug 2007); Tacoma Art Museum, Tacoma, WA (Sept-Dec 2007); The Speed Art Museum, Louisville, KY (Dec 2007-Mar 2008); Denver Art Museum, Denver, CO (Apr-Jul 2008); Philadelphia Museum of Art, Philadelphia, PA (Aug-Oct 2008).
- 2018: History Refused to Die: Highlights from the Souls Grown Deep Foundation Gift. The Metropolitan Museum of Art, New York, NY
- 2018: Souls Grown Deep: Artists of the African American South. Philadelphia Museum of Art, Philadelphia, PA
- 2019-2020: The Quilts of Gee's Bend. New Orleans Museum of Art, New Orleans, LA
- 2020: We Will Walk – Art and Resistance in the American South. Turner Contemporary, Margate, UK
- 2022-2023: Called to Create: Black Artists of the American South. National Gallery of Art, Washington, DC
- 2023: Souls Grown Deep like the Rivers: Black Artists from the American South. Royal Academy of Arts, London, UK
- 2023-2024: The Irreplaceable Human. Louisiana Museum of Modern Art, Humlebæk, Denmark
- 2024: Stitching the Revolution: Quilts as Agents of Change, Mattatuck Museum, Waterbury, Connecticut
- 2025: Kith & Kin: The Quilts of Gee's Bend. Irish Museum of Modern Art, Dublin, Ireland

== See also ==
- African American art
- List of African-American visual artists
- Jessie T. Pettway
- Annie Bendolph
- Sue Willie Seltzer
- Willie Abrams
- Estelle Witherspoon
- Minder Coleman
- Aolar Mosely
- Nettie Young
- Polly Bennett
