= Mary T. Smith =

African American painter

Mary Tillman Smith
- Mary T. Smith and her paintings at her home in Hazelhurst, Mississippi
- Born: Mary Tillman Smith; 1905; Brookhaven, Mississippi
- Died: 1995 (aged 89–90); Hazelhurst, Mississippi
- Known for: Painting
- Movement: Contemporary Art

Mary Tillman Smith (1904–1995) was a self-taught painter of the American South who lived and worked in Mississippi most of her life. She created bold, colorful, and expressive paintings, usually using house paint on wood or tin. Her work consists of highly stylized figures in strong colors, often with animating dots and dashes, alongside sometimes cryptically abstracted texts laid upon monochrome contrasting background colors. Her work is shown throughout the world and collected by museums, most famously by the National Gallery of Art, Washington, D.C., and the Metropolitan Museum of Art, as well as numerous other museums including the High Museum of Art in Atlanta; the de Young Museum of Art in San Francisco; the Museum of Fine Arts, Houston; the Milwaukee Art Museum; the Birmingham Museum of Art; and the Smithsonian American Art Museum; as well as the collections of Tufts University, Willamette University, and the University of Mississippi. She has received solo shows at galleries in the United States and Europe, and has been included in numerous group shows. She is considered a Southern self-taught artist, a group that includes Thornton Dial and Nellie Mae Rowe. Her work was heavily promoted by the curator and collector William Arnett.

== Life ==
Smith was the daughter of sharecroppers. Smith was the third of thirteen children and at an early age was identified as deaf. She completed a fifth-grade education, despite the isolation and loneliness that came with not having access to the hearing world around her. Throughout her childhood, Smith "found an outlet in drawing."

Smith married twice, once in a short marriage to Gus Williams in 1922 and then to John Smith sometime in the 1930s. Her second marriage was also short, ending when Smith saw that her tenant-farmer husband's year-end settlement was grossly short. Her complaints about the mistake, a more than $1,000 difference, led to John Smith "sending her away." Smith then moved to Hazelhurst, Mississippi, to live on her own. In 1941, she gave birth to her son, Sheridan L. Major, though she did not marry his father. Smith worked as a gardener and did other domestic work until she retired in the 1970s.

In 1985, Smith suffered a stroke that left her speech and writing impaired. She was slowed down to producing only two pieces of work a day after her stroke. As her work output slowed, Smith made less money, and she stopped painting in 1991. She died in 1995.

== Work ==
Smith began painting in the late 1970s. She transformed her home and garden, an area of approximately one acre, into an immersive outdoor environment—a "highly public form of spiritual autobiography." Her highly expressive and personal work embodied the ideas that had been in her head for years. Once Smith's connected with art collectors, she struggled to keep up with the demand.

Smith's work was often created on readily available materials, such as plywood, corrugated tin and other recycled parts. In her earlier work, she often used only one or two colors of paint. Her stylized imagery "recalls West African ceremonial masks" and many are allegorical. Her art has been likened to artists like Jean-Michel Basquiat. Her work was also very personal in nature. One of her favorite themes was to paint portraits of family, friends and neighbors. Many of her works feature figures with their arms upraised, an image associated with ecstasy or spiritual enlightenment.

Smith's later work consisted of geometric compositions with more colors and interesting juxtapositions of positive and negative space. Her work sometimes incorporated text along with her imagery. These textual parts of her work were cryptic and created a "personal painting vocabulary" which "documented and celebrated her world, both religious and secular."

== Quotes and criticism ==
"In the South there were many women who labored as farm hands. Meeting Ms. Smith, witnessing her handiwork and sensitivity and her praising the Lord in her everyday actions, touched me. I could feel all that power she put into her work. She had a hard life... She painted so boldly and on any material she had. She surrounded herself and her yard with her work. She couldn't hear very well, but she could say whatever she needed to say with a paintbrush and she had a smile that would melt your heart." - artist and musician Lonnie Holley

"... As with all advanced improvisation, Smith's was never an unmodulated, let-it-all-hang-out, instinctual process, but rather a mixing of careful planning with retrospective and prospective painterly performance–an act of looking back (in time or space) and looking forward at the painting. One untitled work contains sequential applications of black paint, then orange, then more black, and then red paint. Their effect restrains the orange, the piece's most aggressive color. A resulting tension between the black and the hot colors is tightened by the use of black both to underpaint and to partially efface the orange figures. Notice as well that all five faces’ features are created with different combinations of colors. Written inscriptions, vigorous brushwork, and virtuoso color were not her only expressive tools; she also could dress her message. An interesting relationship existed between Smith's wardrobe and her art. In her closet, Smith kept an extensive dress collection defined, as was her yard, by juxtapositions of the spiritual and the mundane. These dresses reflected her every mood and thought. They hung in her closet, compartmentalized, sacred and profane; quiet, solemn spirituals sung by Marian Anderson; boisterous celebrations of life by Louis Armstrong, Little Richard, B.B. King. When she felt pious or humble, when she would draw a picture of a simple little house with a tiny lone occupant and accompany it with a statement of ultimate humility—"My name is someone. The Lord for me he no”—or when she would paint Christ surrounded by spots of blood, she would dress in white–the traditional domestic servant's outfit (it was called a “uniform”) or a nurse's attire—to serve God or to try to heal us all. When she painted a portrait of a friend with orange and green house paint, or other lively multicolor tributes to her dogs and cats, or when she felt like chastising us for our shortcomings (“On face is all righ to face wont do” or “The Lord know ho is good and ho is baid and ho tells lies”), she came out in explosions of color, flashing, zigzagging, speaking her piece, standing her ground. She stood her ground until 1995, when she died at the age of ninety-one. A poor, black, uneducated, hearing-impaired daughter of a sharecropper had become a major artist exhibited and collected throughout the United States..." - William Arnett, founder of the Souls Grown Deep foundation.

== Selected exhibitions ==
Called To Create: Black Artists of the American South, National Gallery of Art, Washington, DC, September 18, 2022 – March 26, 2023, curated by Harry Cooper.
