= Arthur Dial =

American artist (1930–2021)

- Born: May 10, 1930; Emelle, Alabama, U.S.
- Died: February 19, 2021 (aged 90); Bessemer, Alabama, U.S.
- Occupations: Painter, sculptor
- Relatives: Thornton Dial (brother); Thornton Dial Jr. (nephew); Richard Dial (nephew); Ronald Lockett (nephew)

Arthur Dial (May 10, 1930 – February 19, 2021) was an American painter and sculptor who lived and worked in Bessemer, Alabama. He was a part of the Dial family of artists, which includes his older brother, Thornton Dial, and his nephews, Thornton Dial Jr., Richard Dial, and Ronald Lockett.

== Life ==
Arthur Dial and his older half-brother Thornton "Buck" Dial were born in Emelle, Alabama, in Sumter County, Alabama. They were raised by their grandmother until Arthur was seven years old. After that, they were raised by their aunt, Lillian Bell, in Bessemer, Alabama.

Dial reached the third grade before foregoing school to join the workforce. His first job was at a sawmill, followed by a string of jobs with Water Works, Jefferson County, and the Pullman Standard boxcar factory before settling into a job with U.S. Pipe. Dial remained at U.S. Pipe (known as the "Pipe Shop") for 37 years until he was forced to retire at 62 years old due to work-related pulmonary issues.

Dial died in Bessemer, Alabama, on February 19, 2021, at the age of 90.

== Career ==
Although Arthur Dial drew when he was a child, he became very invested in making art in adulthood. He sought a way to unwind and decompress after days working in the high stakes environment of the U.S. Pipe foundry and found refuge in gardening, fishing, and making art. He began using discarded materials from the foundry like scrap pipe. steel, and other materials to create people, animals, and religious icons. His studio is a shed adjacent to his home, which he called, his "home away from home":

"In the shed out back, my ideas get turned into something. That junkhouse shed is my home away from home. I got my spinners and tackle box for fishing, all my tools for gardening, all my chicken feed, medicine for the chickens, and my boards, paint and materials for art making. I got a lot of stuff out there. My shed is my pride and joy."

Dial created reliefs and paintings that narrowed in on a specific moment within the broader narrative that he wished to convey. He uses these moments, such as Eve reaching for the forbidden fruit or "George Wallace blockading the entrance to the University of Alabama in Montgomery," to highlight historical or folkloric moments of extreme tension. Dial's focus on scenes of conflict in humanity's real or imagined history come from his direct observation of southern life throughout the 20th century. He describes his narratives as "a record of what went by"

=== Exhibitions and permanent collections ===
Dial's work has been documented in the following exhibitions:

- Living Traditions: Southern Black Folk Art. 17 Aug- 27 Oct. 1991, The Museum of York County, Rock Hill, North Carolina.
- Wrestling with History: A Celebration of African American Self-Taught Artists from the collection of Ronald and June Shelp. 1996, Baruch College, New York City.
- Testimony: Vernacular Art of the African American South: The Ronald and June Shelp Collection. 15 Sep., 2000- Jan. 2004, Kalamazoo Institute of Arts, Kalamazoo, MI.
- Southern Spirit: the Hill Collection. 21 Feb. 31 Mar. 2000, Museum of Art, Tallahassee, FL.
- Stories of Community: Self-Taught Art from the Hill Collection. 12 Aug- 30 Oct. 2004. Museum of Arts and Sciences, Macon. GA
- Southern Folk Art from the Permanent Collection. 28 Apr. - 22 Jul, 2012, Georgia Museum of Art, Athens, GA.
- Our Faith Affirmed- Works from the collection of Gordon W. Bailey. 10 Sep.- 2014- 8 Aug. 2015, University of Mississippi Museum of Art, Oxford, MS.
- History Refused to Die. 2015 Alabama Contemporary Art Center. Mobile, AL.
- History Refused to Die: Highlights from the Souls Grown Deep Foundation Gift. 22 May- 23 Sep. 2018, Metropolitan Museum of Art.

Dial's work currently exists in the following museums' permanent collections:

- Metropolitan Museum of Art
- High Museum of Art
- Minneapolis Institute of Art
- Rockford Art Museum
- Gadsden Arts Center
