= Richard Dial =

African–American sculptor and designer

Richard Dial (born 1955) is an African–American designer and sculptor known for his metal works and anthropomorphic furniture. Dial lives and works in Bessemer, AL.

== Life ==
Richard Dial grew up in Bessemer, Alabama with his father, within a prolific artistic family that included his father Thornton Dial, mother Clara Mae Dial, and his siblings Thornton Dial Jr., Daniel Dial, and Matte Dial. He graduated from Hueytown High School and earned two years of technical training at Bessemer Technical School. In 1976 he married Belinda Davis and together they raised two sons. He began working as a machinist at the Pullman Standard Company in Bessemer, AL where his father and uncle, Arthur Dial, also worked. After Pullman shut down, he did maintenance work for the Mayfield Manufacturing Company. In 1984, with help from his father and brother, Dan, Richard left the Pullman Standard Company and began his own business, Dial Metal Patterns. Dial Metal Patterns designs, creates, and distributes metal patio furniture inspired by Thornton Dial's furniture that he made in the early 1980s.

== Career ==
From metals discarded in his shop, Richard Dial welded single, metal chairs into anthropomorphized narratives of the people and communities that they could hold. In his analysis of Dial's Comfort Series of chairs Robert Hobbs wrote "Richard Dial's sculptures give new life to the dead metaphors of chair legs and arms at the same time that they transform these seats into personifications of tradition." Expressive faces are bent and welded into the backs and tops of the chairs, giving them a distinct personality. Extra legs or angles were added to chairs, such as in The Comfort of Prayer (1988), to convey that the character-cum-chair was in a kneeling position or had a hand on the hip. Occasionally, Dial combines two chairs or characters into one sculpture to portray familial relations, such as in The Comfort of the First Born (1988) and The Comfort and Service My Daddy Brings to Our Household (1988). Other chairs portray political, historical, and religious narratives in very concise strokes and movements. The Comfort of Moses and the Ten Commandments (1989) and Which Prayer Ended Slavery (1989) conveys the syncretism of the Abrahamic religions into the African-American southern tradition.

Unlike other southern African American artists who found human forms in inanimate objects, namely Bessie Harvey, Archie Byron, and Ralph Griffin, Richard Dial chose metal and mechanics over wood. He found human forms in the mechanics that humans ultimately created and "enjoys playing with the magic of wit in a machine-made world."

== Exhibitions ==
- Outside the Main Stream: Folk Art in Our Time. May-Aug, 1988. High Museum of Art at Georgia-Pacific Center, Atlanta, GA.
- Wrestling with History: A Celebration of African American Self-Taught Artists from the Collection of Ronald and June Shelp. 1996, Baruch College, CUNY, New York.
- Southern Spirit: The Hill Collection. 21 Feb.- 31 Mar., 2000. Museum of Art, Tallahassee, FL.
- Testimony: Vernacular Art of the African American South: The Ronald and June Shelp Collection. 15 Sep.- Jan 2004, Kalamazoo Institute of Art, Kalamazoo, MI.
- Stories of Community: Self-Taught Art from the Hill Collection. 12 Aug.- 30 Oct. 2004, Museum of Arts and Sciences, Macon, GA.
- History Refused to Die. 2015, Alabama Contemporary Art Center, Mobile, AL.

== Collections ==
His work is included in the permanent collections of the Souls Grown Deep Foundation, the High Museum of Art and the American Folk Art Museum.
