= Red Figure Pelike with an Actor Dressed as a Bird =

- Material: Ceramic
- Height: 8 in (20.3 cm)
- Width: 6 in (15.2 cm)
- Created: 430–420 BC
- Place: Greek, Attic
- Present location: Michael C. Carlos Museum

The Red Figure Pelike with an Actor Dressed as a Bird is a ceramic vessel from the Attic region of Greece that is dated to between 430–420 BC. It is decorated using the red-figure technique and depicts a continuous scene from Greek old comedy. This vessel is currently housed in the Michael C. Carlos Museum at Emory University in Atlanta, Georgia.

Due to compositional and stylistic similarities, the Red Figure Pelike with an Actor Dressed as a Bird is often compared to a calyx-krater that was previously housed in the J. Paul Getty Museum until it was returned to the Italian Ministry of Culture in 2007.

== Description ==
=== Vessel type ===
While the historical term for two-handled vases with a large, bulbous bodies, such as this one, remains unknown, the term pelike (pl. pelikai) is generally used to refer to such vessels today. These vessels were used to store various liquids, such as wine and oil. It is highly likely that this specific pelike was once used as a wine container, as theatrical scenes primarily appear on vessels that relate specifically to wine consumption, such as kraters and oenochoai. Both the fact that Dionysus was the Greek god of both wine and theater, and the understanding that inebriation allowed individuals to lose their inhibitions and adopt new guises, similar to how actors assume various roles, help explain this common artistic practice.

=== Figural composition ===
On one side of the vase, an actor is depicted in a twisted and active pose with his left leg lifted in the air. He appears to be taking a large step forward. He wears tights that cover the bulk of his body and are decorated with black dots. These spots recall depictions of animal pelts. The actor also wears high, soft boots called kothornoi, each of which has a phallus attached to its heal. On top of his bodysuit, the actor wears shorts. These also have an attached phallus as well as an attached bird tail. The actor's bird costume is completed by a set of wings and a bird mask. Based on the design of the actor's mask, which includes a comb and wattle, and the phalli that are attached to the actor's boots like spurs, it can be assumed that this actor is meant to represent a rooster. The theatrical space on this vessel is further denoted through the use of two broken meander patterns. The lower of these two patterns compositionally forms the stage on which the actor stands. These meander patterns are continued on the reverse side of the vessel, suggesting that both sides of the pelike represent the same theatrical stage.

On the reverse side of the pelike, an older, bearded man is depicted playing an instrument referred to as a double aulos. The musician wears a fillet in his hair and sports a long chiton that is decorated with a spotted pattern, akin to the actor's tights.

Taken together, the vase's figural composition indicates a performance by a comedic chorus.

== Interpretation ==
The Red Figure Pelike with an Actor Dressed as a Bird is sometimes grouped with about twenty Greek pottery pieces that are referred to as the komos vases. These vessels all date to between 560 and 420 BC and primarily depict comedic choruses that are composed of either actors dressed as animals or actors riding animals. Gwendolyn Compton-Engle, a scholar of Greek drama, notes that in the case of these vessels, the term komos is used to refer to "highly organized spectacle," instead of "spontaneous, drunken postsympotic shenanigans." Furthermore, the inclusion of a musician playing an aulos is a common indication that a scene is theatrical in nature.

=== Aristophanes’ The Birds ===
Due to the fact that the actor on this pelike is dressed as a bird, it has been suggested that the scene is connected to The Birds, a play by the Athenian dramatist Aristophanes. The vessel, however, predates the production of the play, which was produced in 414 BC, by about ten years. This suggests that while the scene portrayed on the vessel is not directly taken from The Birds, it does provide evidence for a tradition of actors dressing up as birds, from which Aristophanes may have drawn inspiration.

=== Roosters ===
In Greek mythology and culture, roosters are highly symbolic birds. This symbolism can provide clues as to the meaning behind the costume of the performer within the context of an old comedy play. In particular, roosters were often associated with the contrasting themes of love and violence.

In regard to love, it is known, for example, that mature males would often give beautiful youths roosters as tokens of affection. This is evidenced by the myth of Ganymede, in which Zeus presents the young boy with a rooster before spiriting him off to serve as a cupbearer on Olympus. As comedic plays often satirically critiqued various aspects of Greek life, the topic of pederasty may have been served as a valid theme for a play.

On the other hand, the rooster costume may symbolize aggression or violence. In particular, the god of war Ares is said to have changed a man into a rooster for failing to alert him to the rising of the sun. Cock fighting was also a common practice in Greece at the time of this vessel's creation. Furthermore, scholar Eric Caspo has noted that a rooster's comb and wattle resembles Corinthian helmet types.

=== Satyr plays ===
This scene on this pelike has also been compared to scenes of satyr plays, especially in relation to the bird actor's costume. Specifically, both the bird actor and actors in depictions of satyr plays are shown wearing the same type of shorts, referred to as perizomata, that have a circular symbol on the hip. Satyr actors also have horse tails attached to their shorts, similar to how the actor on the pelike has an attached bird tail. Furthermore, the depiction of the bird actor, like all depictions of satyr actors, is ithyphallic. It is rare to find depictions of actors playing other humans with erect phalli.
