= William Jamieson =

William Jamieson may refer to:

- William Darius Jamieson (1873–1949), newspaper publisher and U.S. Representative from Iowa
- William Allan Jamieson (1839–1916), Scottish physician and academic author
- William Jamieson (mining) (1852–1926), Australian surveyor
- William Jamieson (Australian politician) (1861–1912), member of the South Australian House of Assembly
- Billy Jamieson (1954–2011), Canadian treasure and antique dealer and reality TV star
- Willie Jamieson (born 1963), football player
- Willie Jamieson (curler), Scottish curler
