= Souls Grown Deep Foundation =

American non-profit arts organization

- Address: Atlanta, Georgia
- Type: Foundation

Construction
- Opened: 2010

Website
- http://soulsgrowndeep.org/

Souls Grown Deep Foundation is a non-profit organization dedicated to documenting, preserving, and promoting the work of leading contemporary African American artists from the Southeastern United States. Its mission is to include their contributions in the canon of American art history through acquisitions from its collection by major museums, as well as through exhibitions, programs, and publications. The foundation derives its name from a 1921 poem by Langston Hughes (1902–1967) titled "The Negro Speaks of Rivers," the last line of which is "My soul has grown deep like the rivers.

The foundation is led by Maxwell L. Anderson, who serves as both its president, and a member of its board of trustees. Anderson was previously director of the Dallas Museum of Art and the Whitney Museum of American Art in New York.

== Collection ==
The Souls Grown Deep Foundation Collection contains over 1,100 works by more than 160 artists, two-thirds of whom are women. Ranging from large-scale assemblages to works on paper, the foundation is particularly strong in works dating from the death of Martin Luther King Jr. (1968) to the end of the twentieth century. The roots of these works can be traced to slave cemeteries and secluded woods. Following the Civil War, when the southern agrarian economy collapsed and rural African American sharecroppers and tenant farmers were forced to migrate for survival to major population centers—particularly in and around Birmingham, Alabama, where iron and steel production created jobs—a new and more public language of quilts, funerary, and yard arts arose. Beyond painting, sculpture, assemblage, drawing, and textile-making, this tradition also included music, dance, oral literature, informal theater, culinary arts, and more. Much like jazz musicians, the artists of this tradition reflect the rich, symbolic world of the black rural South through highly charged works that address a wide range of revelatory social and political subjects.

Among the artists represented are Thornton Dial, Lonnie Holley, Mary T. Smith, Joe Minter, Nellie Mae Rowe, Purvis Young, Emmer Sewell, Ronald Lockett, Joe Light, Polly Bennett, and the Gees Bend quilters.

== Origins ==
Souls Grown Deep Foundation was founded in 2010, but traces its roots to the mid-1980s, when William S. Arnett, an art historian and collector, began to collect the artworks of largely undiscovered African American artists across nine southeastern states. Developed outside of the structure of schools, galleries, and museums, these art traditions emerged in the post–Civil Rights era and have been associated with the political and social themes of that period. The majority of the works and ephemeral documents held by the foundation were compiled by Arnett and his sons over three decades, with the goal of creating a collection that could serve as a record and legacy of this culture.

By the mid-1990s Arnett's efforts culminated in an ambitious survey exhibition of this tradition titled Souls Grown Deep: African American Vernacular Art of the South, presented in conjunction with the 1996 Olympic Games in Atlanta and in partnership with the City of Atlanta and the Michael C. Carlos Museum of Emory University. The subsequent two-volume publication Souls Grown Deep: African American Vernacular Art of the South, remains the most in-depth examination of the movement.

== Transfer of collection ==
In 2014 the Souls Grown Deep Foundation began a multi-year program to transfer the majority of works in its care to the permanent collections of leading American and international art museums. To date, this program has led to the acquisition of over 350 works by more than 100 artists from the foundation's collection by 17 museums including the Metropolitan Museum of Art, the Fine Arts Museums of San Francisco, the High Museum of Art, the New Orleans Museum of Art, the Philadelphia Museum of Art, the Ackland Art Museum, the Virginia Museum of Fine Arts, the Brooklyn Museum, the Morgan Library & Museum, the Dallas Museum of Art, the Spelman College Museum of Fine Art, the Museum of Fine Arts, Boston, Clark Atlanta University Art Museum, the Minneapolis Institute of Art, the Montgomery Museum of Fine Arts, and The Phillips Collection. Forty works by 21 artists were purchased by the National Gallery of Art in 2020.

Exhibitions of acquisitions from the Souls Grown Deep Foundation include Revelations: Art from the African American South (2017–2018) at the de Young Museum in San Francisco; History Refused to Die: Highlights from the Souls Grown Deep Foundation Gift (2018) at the Metropolitan Museum of Art; Cosmologies from the Tree of Life: Art from the African American South (2019) at the Virginia Museum of Fine Arts; Souls Grown Deep: Artists of the African American South (2019) at the Philadelphia Museum of Art; and Called to Create: Black Artists of the American South (2022–2023) at the National Gallery of Art.

== See also ==
- African-American art
- African-American history
- Black Southerners
- Folk art
