= Niagara Falls Museum =

Museum in Canada

Coordinates: 43.0893°N 79.0913°W

- Established: 1827
- Location: Niagara Falls, Ontario, Canada

The Niagara Falls Museum, in Niagara Falls, Ontario, was founded by Thomas Barnett in 1827. After a number of moves and varying fortunes it closed in 1998. The museum is known for housing the mummy of Ramesses I for 140 years before its return to Egypt in 2003.

== History ==
Barnett opened the museum in 1827 at the base of the Canadian Horseshoe Falls. Before this, he had retrofitted a former brewery to exhibit the private collection. Although Barnett was aware of the collection patterns of his North American contemporaries, his approach resembled the British tradition like the Ashmolean Museum in Oxford (the first traditional museum in Britain). The museum was moved to a new building in 1937.

The museum initially contained Barnett's cabinet of taxidermic curiosities. Although the details were not documented, the collection was probably a number of mounted animals of local origin combined with Native Canadian artifacts. An account of the museum's contents before 1844 said that it had over 5,000 items, including bipeds, quadrupeds, birds, fish, insects, reptiles, shells, minerals, and Native American curiosities. During the first fifty years of its existence, the museum acquired similar artifacts through the efforts of the Barnett family and their associates.

In 1854, Barnett's son Sydney went to Egypt three times (twice by himself and once with a Dr. J. Douglas of Montreal) and purchased four mummies and other Egyptian antiquities. In 1857, mastodon remains were discovered in St. Thomas, Ontario and later placed in the museum. In 1859, an inventory of the museum's contents included an egg collection, ancient and modern coins, and Japanese and Chinese relics. Visitor numbers fell after one of the museum's employees was such by the son of neighbouring hotel owner Saul Davis in 1970.

Sydney Barnett organized a Wild West Show and Grand Buffalo Hunt in 1872. He contacted Buffalo Bill Cody and his friend Texas Jack Omohundro, who agreed to lasso live buffalo and to bring Pawnee Indians with him to stage a grand buffalo hunt. Problems arose when the United States government would not allow the Indians off the reservation, fearful that if they reached the Canadian side of the falls, they wouldn't return to their reservation. The show was then changed, with scout and lawman "Wild Bill" Hickok as master of ceremonies assisted by local Woodland Indians from the Tuscarora and Cayuga nations. By all accounts, the buffalo hunt was a failure. The following year, the Barnetts purchased the remains of a 40-foot humpback-whale skeleton. Both Barnetts were accomplished taxidermists, preparing specimens for the museum and for sale to other institutions.

Barnett went bankrupt in 1878 at which point the museum and its contents were purchased by Saul Davis in 1878. Four years later, the Niagara Parks Commission was formed to convert the waterfront to present-day Queen Victoria Park. The museum had to be relocated, but a suitable location could not be found and it was moved back to Niagara Falls in 1888. In 1891, an art gallery was established. Several more Egyptian mummies and the entire collection of the Wood's Museum of Chicago were purchased. There were documented exchanges of artifacts and specimens between the museum and P.T. Barnum.

In 1892, the museum's living display ended because of complaints by area residents about noise and odors. A number of artifacts displayed in Buffalo at the 1901 Pan-American Exposition had been acquired by the museum. A giant Sequoia tree, reportedly felled on the Eel River in Humboldt County, California on February 14, 1893, was a highlight of the exposition's Forestry Building. At 77 feet (23 m) in circumference, it was one of the largest trees ever cut down. The museum also received a shell and coral collection gathered by Louis Agassiz of Harvard University.

Thomas Barnett died in 1890 in Niagara Falls, Ontario, the founder of Canada's oldest museum. In 1942 the museum was purchased by Jacob Sherman who in 1958 moved it to Niagara Falls, Ontario where it remained until it closed in 1998. The museum's collection was owned by the Sherman family until May 1999, when it was purchased by private collector William Jamieson of Toronto in the hope of reviving Barnett's tradition.

== Associated people ==
The museum returned mummies to Zahi Hawass of Egypt's Supreme Council of Antiquities. Saul Davis purchased the museum in 1878, and introduced an art gallery. The museum was moved to the American side of Niagara Falls, moving back to the Canadian side when the US parks authority took possession of the land on which it stood.

The Sherman family sold the museum's collection in 1999 to Canadian collector Billy Jamieson, a dealer of tribal art. The Niagara Falls History Museum acquired part of the museum collection in 2014; this included Skipper, Barnett's beloved two-legged dog.

== Identification of Ramesses I ==
In 1999, Jamieson sold the Egyptian artifacts in the museum's collection (including some mummies) to the Michael C. Carlos Museum at Emory University in Atlanta, Georgia. These included an unidentified male mummy. Through research and collaboration with medical experts at the Emory University School of Medicine, museum scholars identified the mummy as Pharaoh Ramesses I. The museum returned the mummy to Egypt in 2003 as a gesture of goodwill and international cultural cooperation.
