= Emelle, Alabama =

- Town
- Location of Emelle in Sumter County, Alabama.
- Coordinates: 32°43′43″N 88°18′59″W
- Country: United States
- State: Alabama
- County: Sumter

Area
  - Total: 0.21 sq mi (0.55 km^{2})
  - Land: 0.21 sq mi (0.55 km^{2})
  - Water: 0 sq mi (0.00 km^{2})
- Elevation: 259 ft (79 m)

Population (2020)
  - Total: 32
  - Density: 152/sq mi (58.6/km^{2})
- Time zone: UTC-6 (Central (CST))
  - Summer (DST): UTC-5 (CDT)
- ZIP code: 35459
- Area codes: 205, 659
- FIPS code: 01-23872
- GNIS feature ID: 2406447
- Website: emelle.org

Emelle is a town in Sumter County, Alabama, United States. As of the 2020 census, Emelle had a population of 32.

== History ==
In 1852, the Mississippi, Gainesville, and Tuscaloosa Railroad was constructed through the site that would become Emelle. The line connected to (and was later bought by) the Mobile and Ohio Railroad, who operated the line until April 14, 1879, when the line was removed.

In 1912, the Alabama, Tennessee and Northern Railroad was built through Emelle, connecting Aliceville, Alabama and York, Alabama. As the story goes, local land owner Joseph Dial agreed to give the railroad right of way through his land if the station would be named Emelle, after his daughters Emma and Ella. However, Joseph Dial died in 1885.

On July 4, 1930, a dispute broke out between the black Robertson family and white store owner Grover Boyd over the sale of a used car battery. Tom Robertson and his sons, Esau and Oliver confronted Clarence Boyd, Grover's nephew and assistant, and attacked him. Grover came outside to assist his nephew, and was shot. That day, a mob formed and traveled to the house of John Robertson, Tom's brother. A fight ensued at John's home, where Esau Robertson was taken by the mob and the house burned, killing John. Later that day, Esau Robertson was lynched.

The town is known for being the site of the largest hazardous waste landfill in the United States, opened 1977 and operated by Waste Management, Inc. That hazardous waste disposal facility was the subject of a case decided by the United States Supreme Court, Chemical Waste Management, Inc. v. Hunt, 504 U.S. 334 (1992).

In 1981, Emelle was incorporated in order to draw a tax from the Waste Management landfill. The inaugural mayor was James Daily

In the 1970s, Bishop Luke Edwards began a farm commune near Emelle named Holyland.

The community was heavily damaged by an EF2 tornado on January 12, 2023.

== Geography ==
According to the U.S. Census Bureau, the town has a total area of 0.2 square miles (0.52 km^{2}), all land.

== Demographics ==
Historical population
Census	Pop.	Note	%±
1990	44		—
2000	31		−29.5%
2010	53		71.0%
2020	32		−39.6%
U.S. Decennial Census

=== Racial and ethnic composition ===
Emelle town, Alabama – Racial and ethnic composition Note: the US Census treats Hispanic/Latino as an ethnic category. This table excludes Latinos from the racial categories and assigns them to a separate category. Hispanics/Latinos may be of any race.
Race / Ethnicity (NH = Non-Hispanic)	Pop 2000	Pop 2010	Pop 2020	% 2000	% 2010	% 2020
White alone (NH)	2	3	3	6.45%	5.66%	9.38%
Black or African American alone (NH)	29	50	26	93.55%	94.34%	81.25%
Native American or Alaska Native alone (NH)	0	0	0	0.00%	0.00%	0.00%
Asian alone (NH)	0	0	0	0.00%	0.00%	0.00%
Native Hawaiian or Pacific Islander alone (NH)	0	0	0	0.00%	0.00%	0.00%
Other race alone (NH)	0	0	0	0.00%	0.00%	0.00%
Mixed race or Multiracial (NH)	0	0	3	0.00%	0.00%	9.38%
Hispanic or Latino (any race)	0	0	0	0.00%	0.00%	0.00%
Total	31	53	32	100.00%	100.00%	100.00%

=== 2010 Census ===
As of the 2010 United States census, there were 53 people living in the town. The racial makeup of the town was 94.3% Black and 5.7% White.

As of the census of 2000, there were 31 people, 15 households, and 10 families living in the town. The population density was 142.9 inhabitants per square mile (55.2/km^{2}). There were 16 housing units at an average density of 73.8 per square mile (28.5/km^{2}). The racial makeup of the town was 6.45% White and 93.55% Black or African American.

There were 15 households, out of which 33.3% had children under the age of 18 living with them, 46.7% were married couples living together, 20.0% had a female householder with no husband present, and 33.3% were non-families. 33.3% of all households were made up of individuals, and 6.7% had someone living alone who was 65 years of age or older. The average household size was 2.07 and the average family size was 2.60.

In the town, the population was spread out, with 29.0% under the age of 18, 3.2% from 18 to 24, 22.6% from 25 to 44, 41.9% from 45 to 64, and 3.2% who were 65 years of age or older. The median age was 42 years. For every 100 females, there were 63.2 males. For every 100 females age 18 and over, there were 57.1 males.

The median income for a household in the town was $5,833, and the median income for a family was $5,000. Males had a median income of $36,250 versus $23,333 for females. The per capita income for the town was $10,738. There were 66.7% of families and 61.9% of the population living below the poverty line, including 100.0% of under eighteens and none of those over 64.

== Chemical Waste Management landfill ==
Emelle is home to the largest hazardous waste landfill in the United States, called the “Cadillac of Landfills”, owned by Chemical Waste Management, Inc. This town of just a few dozen, mostly minority, residents, became a center for controversy on environmental racism. In 1978, Chemical Waste Management purchased a landfill permit of 300 acres (1.2 km^{2}) approximately 4 miles to the north of Emelle. In Sumter County, one-third of the residents live below poverty level. The majority of the residents near the landfill are Black. The landfill has become the largest hazardous waste landfill in the United States and among the top in the world holding 5 or 6 million tons of hazardous waste. Most of the waste disposed of in the United States, due to the Superfund removal program, ended up at the landfill between 1984 and 1987. It is on top of the Eutaw Aquifer, which supplies water to a large part of Alabama.

Key actors in this struggle were Chemical Waste Management, regulatory agencies, and Alabamians for a Clean Environment. Chemical Waste Management is the largest company in the hazardous waste industry, as it serves to more than 10 million residential customers and 1 million businesses. Currently, the company is working on defining an environmental image by participating in many recycling projects. Regulatory agencies are groups responsible for environmental protection that want to establish facilities that can handle the nation's waste safely. Examples include the Alabama Department of Environmental Management and the Environmental Protection Agency (EPA). The Alabamians for a Clean Environment (ACE) is a grassroots environmental group who wants to close down Chemical Waste Management. White women (such as Kaye Kiker) and their husbands formed the group.

Residents and other concerned citizens held a demonstration in Emelle against the Chemical Waste landfill. This demonstration was based on the struggle in Warren County, North Carolina, where the idea of environmental racism and the need for environmental justice emerged. The Emelle demonstration marked the first time that blacks and whites in Sumter County joined together in a public protest over any political issue. Alabamians for a Clean Environment used techniques such as sign waving and name calling to draw attention to their cause. They also had access to the media and Attorney General Jimmy Evans, who became a powerful actor in their cause. Soon they attracted national attention and gained support from larger partisan organizations such as the National Toxics Fund Clearinghouse for Hazardous Wastes, the National Toxics Fund Campaign, the Sierra Club and Greenpeace. They did not achieve their goal of shutting down Chemical Waste Management.

=== Economic background ===
Emelle is located in the Black Belt region in Alabama. During the Civil War, this city played a large role in Alabama’s cotton plantation economy and about half of the residents were slaves. Cotton production kept the Black population in poverty and continued their dependence on the white man. The Civil Rights Act of 1964 brought changes to Emelle, and Blacks were elected to public office in 1978. Soon the economy began to change as government and business elites were the main people affecting land-use decisions. A general theme arose of polluting industries coming into poor minority communities where local community leaders had no input. The environmental risks were traded for jobs. Key local leaders supported Chemical Waste Management, as the counties budgets were increased $5.00 for every ton of waste buried in the county. Once up and running, the dump has had many problems such as on-site fires, water contamination, environmental violations, dumping without permits, and unauthorized acceptance of dioxins.

== Notable people ==
- Arthur Dial, American painter and sculptor
- Thornton Dial, self-taught artist
- Cliff Windham (1961-2004) Former professional basketball player for Eisbären Bremerhaven in Germany.
