= Billy Jamieson =

Canadian antique dealer

- Born: July 3, 1954
- Died: July 3, 2011 (aged 57)
- Known for: Dealer and collector of Tribal Art
- Spouse: Jessica Phillips

William Jamieson (3 July 1954 – 3 July 2011) was a Canadian treasure and antique dealer and reality TV star. Jamieson was also known as the Headhunter. He was the star of History Channel's Treasure Trader. He was also a world-famous dealer of tribal art, described as having "a taste for the bizarre", and as "Indiana Jones meets Gene Simmons". He was also described as a treasure hunter who "is Indiana Jones, minus the rolling boulders, aliens and savage tribesmen".

Jamieson came to international prominence when he discovered the lost mummy of pharaoh Ramses I following his purchase of the then defunct Niagara Falls Museum. He dealt in a diverse array of curios, including mummies and shrunken heads, and his clientele included the Royal Ontario Museum, the Metropolitan Museum of Art, Sotheby's, Christie's, and rock stars such as Mick Jagger and Steven Tyler.

He lived in a three-storey, 6,000 square feet (560 m^{2}) downtown Toronto loft which doubled as a museum housing thousands of his acquired treasures. The Halloween parties at the loft have been described as "legendary", while his guests at the place included Tyler and Tim Burton. Jamieson died at his home on his 57th birthday, the same day his acquisition of the alleged head of Saint Vitalis of Assisi was completed. The head was acquired for €3,500. After his death, hundreds of his exhibits were auctioned off.

== Life ==
Jamieson lived in Brampton growing up and became a school drop-out at 14. Subsequently, he worked in sales for a time, and eventually became self-employed waterproofing basements. In 1995, he overdosed on PCP, an experience that led him to change his life path. Following the overdose, Jamieson sold his business and went to South America where he experimented with the entheogenic brew ayahuasca. It was during this time that he developed an interest in shrunken heads and started trading in them.

He was self-educated and eventually became a world-famous art dealer whose clientele included the Royal Ontario Museum, the Metropolitan Museum of Art, Sotheby's, Christie's, and rock stars Mick Jagger and Steven Tyler. His multifaceted collection, housed in his Toronto loft, which also functioned as a museum, included electric chairs, mummies, torture devices, and shrunken heads, among others, and his Halloween parties there have been described as "legendary".

== Loft ==
Jamieson's three storey 6,000 square feet (560 m^{2}) downtown Toronto loft on Wellington Street, which housed his extensive collection of curiosities, has been described as "...part Madame Tussauds, part Twilight Zone, as interpreted by Tamara de Lempicka." The loft is 14 feet (4.3 m) high, featuring red walls, and a curved staircase connecting the three wooden floors. Visitors to the loft included Steven Tyler and Tim Burton. Jamieson owned close to a dozen shrunken heads, and what amounted to one of the world's largest collections of them.

After his death, his collection was auctioned off. Auction items included a piece of Jumbo's tusk, an electric chair, and a "butt in a box".

== Niagara Falls museum ==
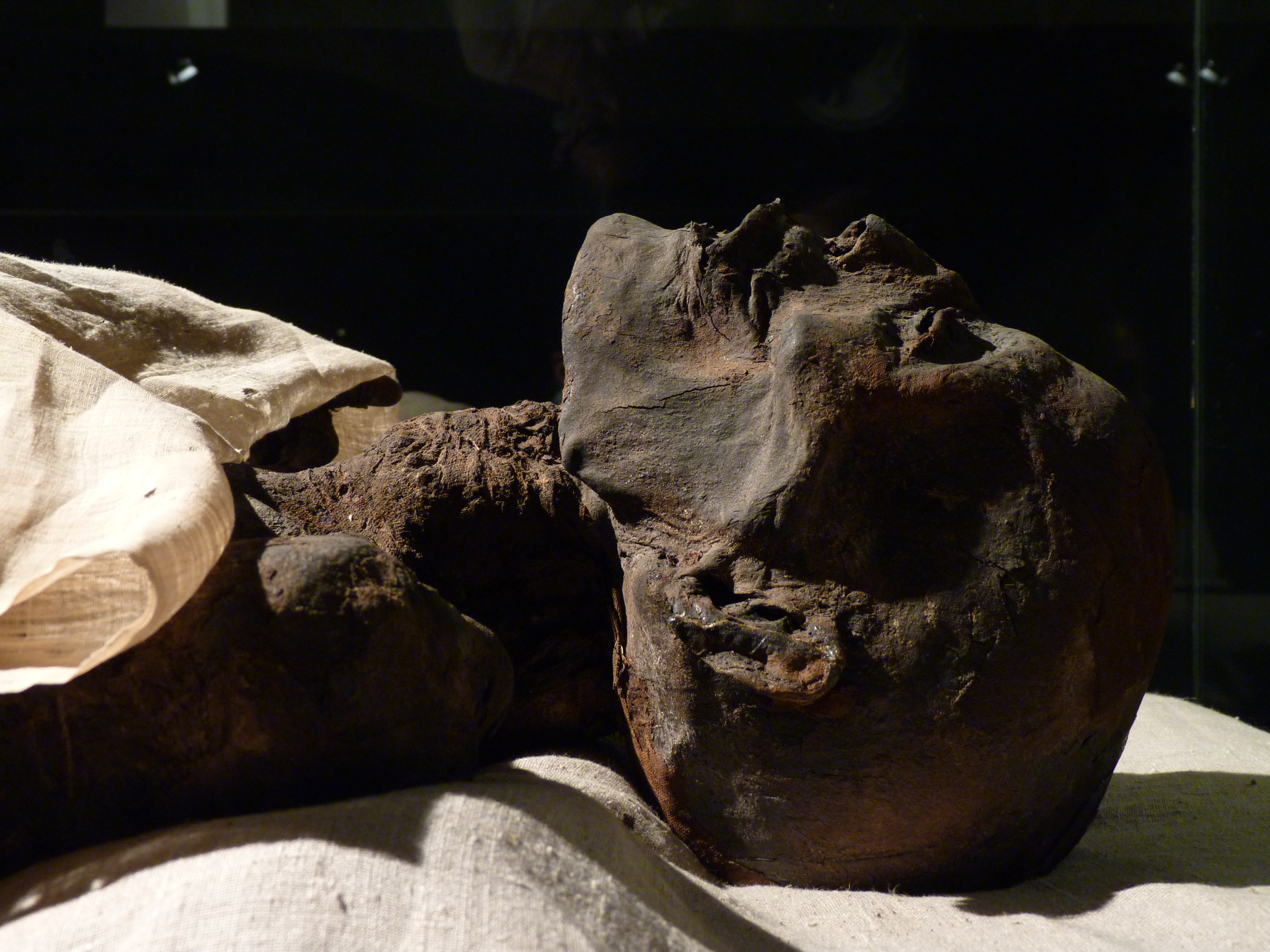
The mummy of Ramses I was found by Jamieson after the purchase of the Niagara Falls Museum.

In 1999, Jamieson bought the then closed Niagara Falls Museum after having a drink of opium tea. There were approximately 700,000 objects in the museum collection. One of the mummies in the museum was later verified to be the mummy of pharaoh Ramses I, the founder of ancient Egypt's 19th dynasty. Ramses's mummy was subsequently sold to the Michael C. Carlos Museum in Atlanta, Georgia for USD 2 million.

The sale of the mummy of Ramses I made Jamieson famous internationally and widened his client base. The mummy was eventually returned to Egypt, with much fanfare. The Carlos Museum on their website did not mention that they acquired the mummy from Jamieson.

== Death ==
Jamieson died of a heart attack on his couch, at his Toronto loft on 3 July 2011. His body was found by his housemaid.

Prior to his death, Jamieson and his fiance Jessica Phillips, were featured in the television show Treasure Trader (aired in 2012). The hit show lasted only 8 episodes and came to an abrupt end when Jamieson died.

== Auctions ==
On 18 November 2012 Jamieson's fiancée Jessica Phillips hired Ritchies Auctioneers of Toronto to auction off 320 items from the thousands that were exhibited in Jamieson's home. On 29 April 2014, items from Jamieson's collection were auctioned off by Jamieson's fiancée through Waddington’s auction house; a parallel online auction ran the same week between Monday and Thursday, through the same auctioneers. An aboriginal child's vest pierced by a bullet and stained by dried blood, scheduled to be auctioned off on 29 April 2014, was pulled from Waddington’s display gallery on the Monday before the auction, after a negative reaction from social media.
