= Vitalis of Assisi =

Italian Roman Catholic saint

Saint Vitalis of Assisi OSB
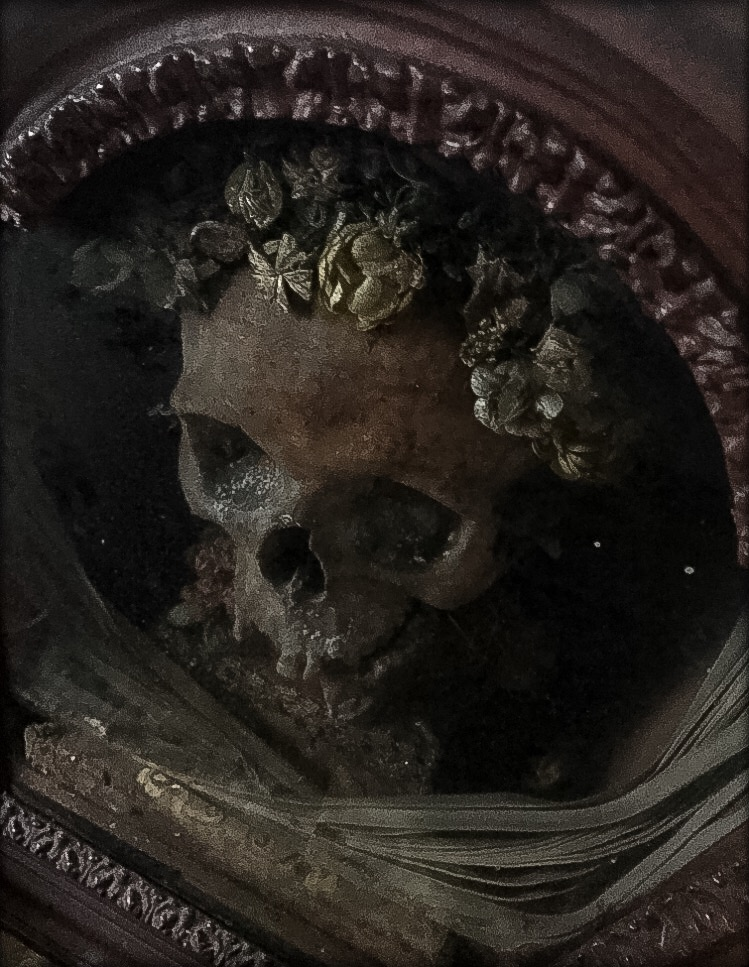
- Saint Vitalis of Assisi in Reliquary Box
- Born: 1295; Bastia Umbra, Papal States
- Died: 31 May 1370 (aged 74–75); Assisi, Papal States
- Venerated in: Roman Catholic Church (Diocese of Assisi)
- Feast: 31 May
- Patronage: patron against disorders of the bladder and genitals

Vitalis of Assisi (Italian: San Vitale d'Assisi) (1295 – 31 May 1370) was an Italian hermit and monk.

== Origin ==
Born in Bastia Umbra, Vitalis, as a youth, was licentious and immoral; however, he attempted to expiate his sins by going on pilgrimage to various sanctuaries in Italy and Europe. When he returned to Umbria, he became a Benedictine monk at Subiaco.

== Life ==
Vitalis then spent the rest of his life in the hermitage of Santa Maria di Viole, near Assisi, in utter poverty. His one possession was an old container that he used to drink water from a nearby spring. His reputation for holiness soon spread after his death. He was known as a patron against illnesses affecting the bladder and genitals.

== Legacy ==
On 29 May 2011, a head preserved as a relic, allegedly that of Vitalis, was offered at auction with an estimate of €1,000 at Annesbrook House, Duleek, County Meath, Ireland. It was sold to Billy Jamieson for €3,500.

In November 2016, the relic was once again purchased by an antiquities and oddities collector, and permanently resides in a private gallery located in the Eastern United States.

This piece has been resold twice and now resides in a private collection in Northern California.
