= Thomas Barnett (Niagara Falls) =

Museum proprietor and collector (1799–1890)

Thomas Barnett (December 4, 1799 – 1890) was a museum proprietor, collector and innkeeper who managed museums and other tourist attractions in Niagara Falls, Ontario. Barnett was born near Birmingham, England and moved to Canada in the 1820s.

== Establishment ==
Barnett is credited for having built the first substantial building in the area now known as 'The Front' at Niagara Falls, Canada. He also erected a museum in 1827 near the edge of the Canadian Horseshoe Falls. This was followed by the construction of a second, more elaborate museum in the early 1840s at another location. It was at this museum that he boasted over "5,000 specimens on display", per an undated report:

There are bipeds, and quadrupeds, birds, fishes, insects, reptiles, shells and minerals and Indian curiousities, all regulated to delight the eye and improve the understanding and mend the heart.

=== Competition ===
Barnett faced stiff competition from Buffalo native, Saul Davis for over 30 years from 1844 to 1877. Davis built the Prospect House next to Barnett's second museum in 1844; then in 1853 Davis built another structure, Table Rock House, next to Barnett's original museum. A competition continued between the business rivals for the next 24 years. Visitors were harassed, while competing stairways to the river's edge were destroyed by fire, explosives and vandalism. In June 1870 there was a homicide victimizing one of Barnett's employees.

== The downfall and aftermath ==
Barnett was criticized for his son Sidney's assault charge in connection with the homicide and, shortly thereafter, began to have financial problems. In a desperate effort to attract the attention of tourists and gain financial windfall, he staged two events, which ended in total fiasco.

James Butler as "Wild Bill" Hickok was to be the focus of a "Great Buffalo Hunt" promoted by Barnett in August 1872. Despite advance publicity and hopes for fifty thousand in attendance, the event was largely considered a failure entertainment wise. As a result, Barnett realized a loss of $20,000.(approximately $700,000 in 2007 U.S. dollars)

In 1877, all of Barnett's riverfront properties and contents were auctioned off. Barnett left the area soon after. Saul Davis, was the purchaser of the properties and owned them until the Niagara Parks Commission was established in 1887, taking over operation of the area of land bordering Niagara Falls known as 'The Front'. The museum could no longer be held there.

The collection found a home on the American side of Niagara Falls until that property was taken over for parking.

Eventually the collection that had begun with Barnett's returned to Canada to be displayed at the Niagara Falls Museum, billed as "North America's Oldest Museum" (north of the present-day Rainbow Bridge) where it was located until the late 1990s.
