= William Arnett =

American art collector (1939–2020)

William Sidney Arnett (May 10, 1939 – August 12, 2020) was an Atlanta-based writer, editor, curator and art collector who built internationally important collections of African, Asian, and African American art. Arnett was the founder and chairman of the Souls Grown Deep Foundation, an organization dedicated to the preservation and documentation of African American art from the Deep South that works in coordination with leading museums and scholars to produce groundbreaking exhibitions and publications using its extensive holdings. His efforts produced 13 books with nearly 100 essays by 73 authors. Thirty-eight museums have hosted major exhibitions, and comprehensive archives are maintained at UNC Chapel Hill. The White House has shown the collection. Arnett exhibited works from these collections and delivered lectures at over 100 museums and educational institutions in the United States and abroad. He is perhaps best known for writing about and collecting the work of African American artists from the Deep South. Arnett was named one of the "100 Most Influential Georgians" by Georgia Trend Magazine in January 2015. He died on August 12, 2020.

== Early life ==
Arnett was born in Columbus, Georgia. After attending Georgia Tech and the University of Pennsylvania, Arnett graduated from the University of Georgia, where he earned a B.A. in English.

== Collecting ==
After living in Europe in the mid-1960s, Arnett built an extensive collection of ancient Mediterranean art and antiquities. He also became interested in Asian art, and amassed works dating from 2000 B.C. to the 19th century.

For a number of years, Arnett's main interest was African Art. He collected the ritual arts from West and Central Africa, particularly the numerous cultures of Nigeria, Benin (formerly Dahomey), the Cameroon Grassfields, and the Democratic Republic of the Congo. In 1978, he co-authored the catalogue Three Rivers of Nigeria for Atlanta's High Museum of Art. In 1994, he donated a significant portion of his extensive collection of African art to the Michael C. Carlos Museum at Emory University, then under the direction of Maxwell Anderson.

In the mid-1980s, Arnett began to collect the work of artists in the black American South, including pieces by such artists as Thornton Dial and Lonnie Holley. By the mid-1990s Arnett's efforts resulted in an ambitious project to survey the visual tradition of the African American South: an exhibition and two-volume book, titled Souls Grown Deep: African American Vernacular Art of the South, which was ultimately presented at the 1996 Summer Olympics in Atlanta and remains the most in-depth, scholarly examination of this phenomenon. Subsequently, Arnett developed a series of related publications, including several books on the quilts created by women living in Gee's Bend, Alabama. He arranged for the first influential exhibition of those quilts at the Museum of Fine Arts, Houston in 2002. The exhibition titled The Quilts of Gee's Bend was shown at 13 major U.S. museums including the Whitney Museum of American Art, the High Museum of Art, MFA Boston, the Milwaukee Museum of Art, the Cleveland Museum of Art, The Corcoran Gallery of Art and the DeYoung Museum.

On November 24, 2014, The Metropolitan Museum of Art announced that 57 works by contemporary African American artists from the Southern United States were donated to the museum by the Souls Grown Deep Foundation from its William S. Arnett Collection. An exhibition devoted to the gift took place at the Metropolitan Museum in fall 2016.

As Sheena Wagstaff, Leonard A. Lauder Chairman of the Department of Modern and Contemporary Art at the Metropolitan Museum, described the gift, "From Thornton Dial's magisterial constructions to the emblematic compositions by the Gee's Bend quilters from the 1930s onwards, this extraordinary group of works contributes immeasurably to the museum's representation of works by contemporary American artists and augments on a historic scale its holdings of contemporary art."

== Writing ==
As Arnett's collection of African American art grew, he became convinced that the so-called folk or outsider artists of the black American South were a coherent cultural movement and constituted a crucial chapter in world art. He spent years gathering extensive documentation and amassing a near-definitive collection of work crucial to the understanding of this cultural phenomenon.

In the year 2000, in an effort to introduce southern black vernacular art to a wider audience, Arnett founded Tinwood Books; a year after the inauguration of its publishing program, Jane Fonda become a 50% owner in the firm. Under the Tinwood imprint, Arnett co-edited and co-authored, with his son Paul Arnett, Souls Grown Deep: African American Vernacular Art of the South, a massive book that featured over 1800 illustrations and ran to over 1000 pages in two volumes. An exhibition of the same title was presented at the 1996 Olympic Games in Atlanta. Additionally, Arnett edited and/or co-authored many other books, including Gee's Bend: The Women and Their Quilts, Gee's Bend: The Architecture of the Quilt, and Thornton Dial in the 21st Century.
