= Thornton Dial Jr. =

American artist

- Born: 1952 (age 73–74); Bessemer, Alabama
- Movement: Contemporary Art

Thornton Dial Jr. (born 1952) is a contemporary African-American painter, sculptor, and assemblage artist living and working in Bessemer, Alabama. He is the eldest son of prolific modern artist, Thornton Dial Sr. His work is best identified by its bold, evocative political and social commentary.

== Life ==
Thornton Dial Jr., also known as "Little Buck," is the eldest son of Thornton Dial Sr. and Clara Mae Murrow. Dial attended William A. Bell High School through the eleventh grade. He married Angela Campbell in April 1972 and together they had one son and one daughter. After they divorced in 1981, Dial remarried Angela Jackson in April 1986. Together they raised one son, one daughter, and one stepdaughter.

Dial and his brothers, Richard and Daniel, grew up surrounded by a creative extended family. Dial's uncle, Arthur, and cousin, Ronald Lockett, were also artists who influenced and were influenced by Thornton Dial Sr. and his inspired children.

After high school, Dial worked for a construction company in the Bluff Park area of Birmingham, roughly twelve miles away from Bessemer. After eight years of working in construction, he began working at the Pullman Standard Company where he learned to bend and shape metal. Many Dial men worked for Pullman and it was their experiences working with industrial materials that inspired their artistic methods.

== Career ==
1986 brought a creative and economic bloom to the Dial Family. That year Richard Dial, Thornton's brother, opened Dial Metal Patterns from which he would begin to make his signature metal "comfort" chairs. It was also the year that Thornton began making his own personal body of work.

Thornton Dial Jr.'s subject matter is almost always a commentary on social, racial, or political relations in the United States. He used controversial imagery, as in The Gorilla Lends a Helping-Hand to the United States and the Telephone Company, to emphasize the role that African Americans played in creating and building American progress. Although his imagery was complex, his messages were not subtle. In his piece The President And His Staff Trying To Decide What To Do About Children On Drugs, Dial paints a frog sunbathing atop a pile of rocks while tadpoles writhe on the river bank, "holding nothing back with his searing commentary."

Dial often uses animals as a stand-in for human subjects in his work. Lions are his symbol for black men in Africa, such as King of Africa, or those in positions of authority, such as Three Lions (Honoring Dr. King and the Kennedy's). However, Dial typically portrays working class black men in America as gorillas. This cynical metaphor is particularly potent in his work Trees to Climb which the shrub-like trees represent the lack of opportunities in America for black working class men and women. Many scholars have also noted Dial's affinity for pattern and repetitive motifs, such as the American flag, dots, stars, stripes, daisies and other flowers.

Dial's experience working in construction and welding guide his painting and sculpting techniques. Common industrial materials such as oil-based paint, Bondo, enamel, sealant, corrugated tin and plywood are the basis of most of Dial's work. His familiarity with these technical materials and processes allow him to use them in innovative, creative ways in his art. His paintings are typically larger than four feet square and his sculptures and assemblages are three feet tall or taller.

== Exhibitions (selection) ==
Dial's work has been featured in the following exhibitions:

1. Outside the Main Stream: Folk Art in Our Time. May- Aug. 1988, High Museum of Art, Atlanta, GA.
2. Living Traditions: Southern Black Folk Art. 17 Aug.- 27 Oct. 1991, The Museum of York County, Rock Hill, SC.
3. Give Me a Louder Word Up: African American Art. 10 Jul.- 22 Aug. 1992, Metropolitan State College of Denver, Denver CO.
4. Wrestling with History: A Celebration of African American Self-Taught Artists from the collection of Ronald and June Shelp. 1996, Baruch College, CUNY, New York.
5. Southern Spirit: The Hill Collection. 21 Feb.- 31 Mar. 2000, Museum of Art, Tallahassee, FL.
6. Testimony: Vernacular Art of the African American South. 15 Sep. 2000- Jan. 2004, Various Institutions.
7. Ancestry and Innovation. 2008, Various Institutions (organized by the American Folk Art Museum).
8. Negritude. 20 May- 25 Jul. 2009, Exit Art, New York.
9. Vernacular Art from the Hill Collection. 28 Aug.- 25 Oct. 2009, Gadsden Arts Center, Quincy, FL.
10. Our Faith Affirmed - Works from the collection of Gordon W. Bailey. 10 Sep. 2014- 15 Aug. 2015, University of Mississippi Museum of Art, Oxford, MS.
11. History Refused to Die. 2015, Alabama Contemporary Art Center, Mobile, AL.
12. Revelations: Art from the African American South. 3 Jun.- 1 Apr. 2018, Fine Arts Museum of San Francisco.
13. Expressions Unbound: American Outsider Art from the Andrew and Linda Safran Collection. 29 Aug.- 16 Dec. 2018, The Tufts University Art Galleries, Boston, MA.
14. What Carried Us Over: Gifts from the Gordon W. Bailey Collection. Sep 13, 2019 - Apr 18, 2020. Pérez Art Museum Miami, FL.
15. Called To Create: Black Artists of the American South, National Gallery of Art, Washington, DC, September 18, 2022 – March 26, 2023.

== Collections ==
Dial's work exists in the following museums' permanent collections:

1. Fine Art Museum of San Francisco
2. American Folk Art Museum
3. Ogden Museum of Southern Art
4. National Gallery of Art, Washington, DC
5. Pérez Art Museum Miami
