= Ronald Lockett =

American artist

- Ronald Lockett with his work Sarah Lockett's Roses
- Born: Ronald Lockett; 1965; Bessemer, Alabama
- Died: 1998 (aged 32–33); Bessemer, Alabama
- Known for: Painting and Assemblage
- Movement: Modern Art

Ronald Lockett (1965–1998) was an American visual artist, combining painting with three dimensional objects. “Lockett's primary artistic mentor” was the painter Thornton Dial, his cousin. In describing his work, Holland wrote of the influences of “blackness in relation to HIV/AIDS, LGBT life, nationalism, and the racial implications of terms such as "outsider," "self-taught," and "folk" in American art”. His work has been shown in the Metropolitan Museum of Art, the Ackland Art Museum, and The American Folk Art Museum.

== Early life ==
Lockett was born and raised in the Pipe Shop neighborhood of Bessemer, Alabama. Since childhood, Lockett knew that he wanted to be an artist, and he grew up under the mentorship of his uncle and artist, Thornton Dial. Lockett was one of five children, four boys and one girl, born to Betty and "Short" Lockett. His father, known as "Short" or "Little Bud," left Betty and their children when Lockett was a young child. Betty suffered from degenerating mental health thereafter, which haunted her until her death in the mid-1990s.

Beset by widespread poverty, pervasive machismo, and the limited opportunities of the mining industry in Bessemer, Lockett never honed a trade. He was socially and economically ostracized from his peers and potential mentors. He lived with his mother until her death, and then in her house until his own death shortly after. His siblings fared variously, some joined the Navy and law enforcement, while another struggled with recidivism.

== Work ==
Coming-of-age after the civil rights movement, and dying before the novels of the 21st century, Lockett was stuck in a socio-cultural limbo. His work shows the simultaneous fight and purgatory of growing up a black male in the 1980s in rural Alabama. Watching his cousin, Thornton Dial, wrestle with current events and American history, such as the Iraq war and American slavery, Lockett also brought his own position in history to his work.

Lockett's early work was meticulously planned and executed. He often joked that he stared at his work more than he worked on it. The Souls Grown Deep Foundation provides a succinct analysis of Lockett's early work in their biography of the artist:

"Despite the stylistic influences of the Western painting tradition, his art could hardly be more vernacular, for in at least five crucial ways he reconfigured traditional African American beliefs and practices. First, he used animals as the protagonists in his allegories in a manner that recontextualizes but is consistent with the roles of animals in nineteenth-century trickster tales and fables. Second, he used African American conjurational materials—blackness, rust, wire, poison, smoke—as the theme or physical medium for his works. Third, his preoccupation with instances of psychological transformation reflected a broadly vernacular emphasis on cathartic and ecstatic religious and performance rituals. Fourth, he was intensely concerned with eschatology—last or final things: a foundation of Afro-Christian theology. Fifth, he partook of the hermeneutic approaches of the root sculptor or the preacher, both of which seek prophetic signs in the found nature of a text—whether that text be the earth or the Bible—as a starting point for the communication of wisdom to others."

When Lockett developed HIV, his outlook changed along with his practice. Instead of painting overt symbolism, he began to mold rusted tin from the side of Thornton Dial's storage sheds into 2 dimensional collages. His renderings of life became movements and waves portrayed through rust and decay.

As his mother became more reclusive, and his HIV caused him to contract other illnesses easily, his work shifted again to multi-media collage. Following in his mother's (and his ancestors') practice of patch-work quilting, he began to collage various materials creating stiff, decaying, quilt patterns. His last few works were delicate, dark paintings reminiscing on the death of his mother and Princess Diana.

Lockett died in 1998 of HIV related pneumonia.

== Select collections ==
- Metropolitan Museum of Art
- Minneapolis Institute of Art

== Relevant literature ==
- Arnett, Paul. 2016. Passing the Buck: The Educations of Ronald Lockett. In Bernard L. Herman, editor, Fever Within: The Art of Ronald Lockett, 61–74. Chapel Hill: University of North Carolina Press.
- Ebony, David. "RONALD LOCKETT." Art in America 104, no. 10 (2016): 150-150.
- Herman, Bernard L., ed. Fever Within: The Art of Ronald Lockett. UNC Press Books, 2016.
- Jentleson, Katherine L. and Thomas J. Lax. 2016. Curating Lockett: An Exhibition History in Two Acts. In Bernard L. Herman, editor, Fever Within: The Art of Ronald Lockett, 45–60. Chapel Hill: University of North Carolina Press.
- McGriff, Meredith. 2017. Review of Fever Within: The Art of Ronald Lockett. Journal of Folklore Research http://www.jfr.indiana.edu/review.php?id=2061.
- Rhodes, Colin. 2016. Cross-Cultural Tendencies, Intellectual Echoes, and the Intersections of Practice Change. In Bernard L. Herman, editor, Fever Within: The Art of Ronald Lockett, 23–32. Chapel Hill: University of North Carolina Press.
