= Michael C. Carlos Museum =

Art museum in Atlanta, Georgia

Coordinates: 33°47′25″N 84°19′27″W

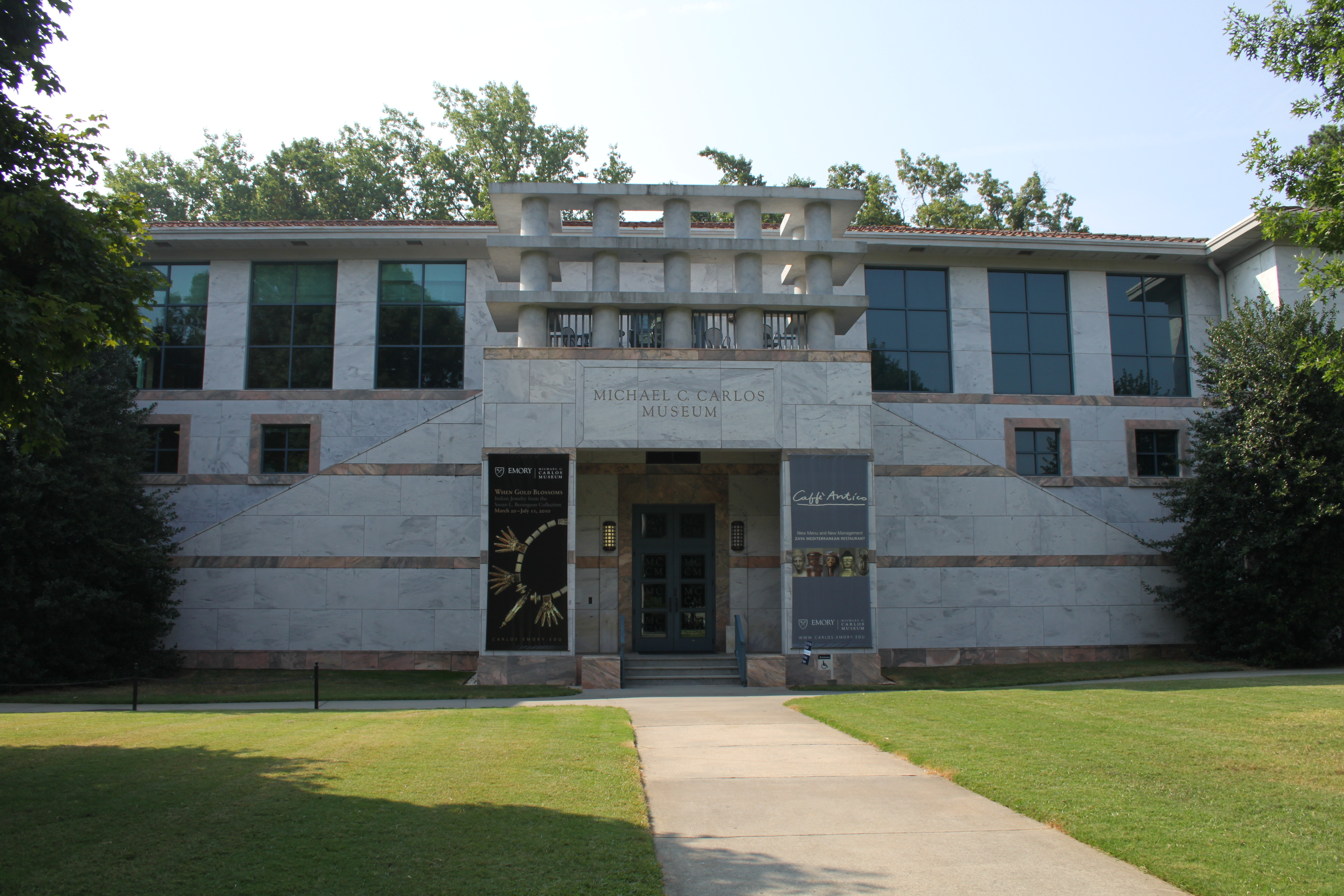
- The Michael C. Carlos Museum in 2021
- Former name: Emory University Museum of Art and Archaeology
- Established: 1876
- Location: 571 South Kilgo Circle; Atlanta; United States
- Type: Art museum
- Visitors: 120,000 annually
- Director: Henry Kim
- Website: carlos.emory.edu

The Michael C. Carlos Museum is an art museum located in Atlanta on the historic quadrangle of Emory University's main campus. The Carlos Museum has the largest ancient art collections in the Southeast, including objects from ancient Egypt, Greece, Rome, the Near East, Africa and the ancient Americas. The collections are housed in a Michael Graves designed building which is open to the public.

== History ==
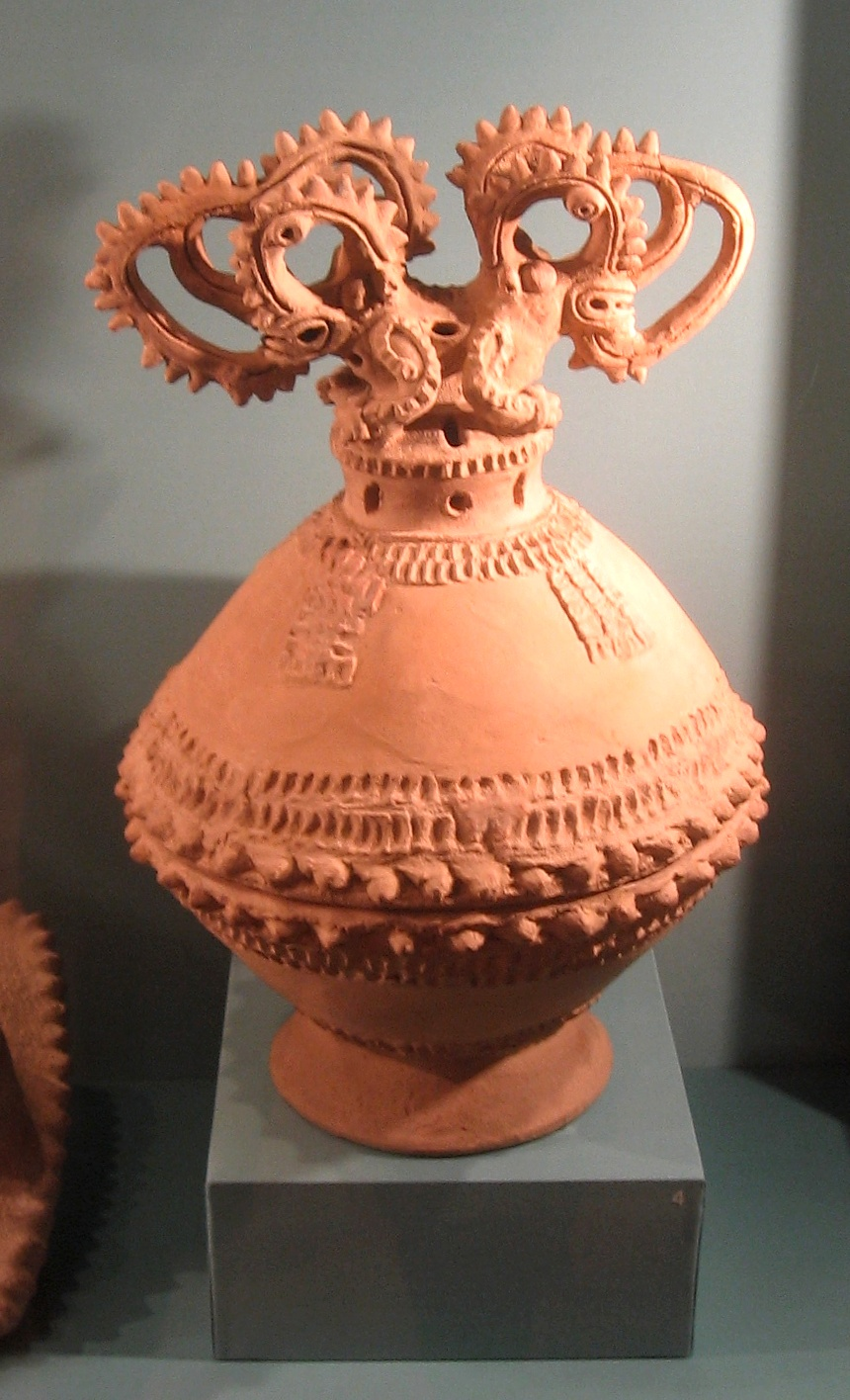
A Pre-Columbian incense burner with a crocodile lid (500 - 1350 CE), from the Carlos Museum's extensive collection of Central American artifacts

One of the oldest museums in Georgia, the museum's collections date back to 1876, when a general museum known as Emory College Museum was established on Emory University's original campus in Oxford, Georgia. After the university was relocated to Atlanta, a small group of professors officially founded the Emory University Museum in 1919. The collections were housed and displayed in various buildings around the campus.

Over the years, Atlanta businessman Michael C. Carlos donated over $20 million to create a permanent home for the museum, which opened in 1985. The museum was renamed again to the Emory University Museum of Art and Archaeology and was officially accredited by the American Alliance of Museums as a museum of antiquities and fine arts. Carlos died in December 2002 at the age of 75.

A major expansion in 1993 transformed the museum into one of Atlanta's top arts institutions. Upon the new building's opening, the museum became known as the Michael C. Carlos Museum, named after its most generous patron.

During the 1996 Summer Olympics, the museum presented two major exhibitions: one on the Emory campus highlighting the work of Thornton Dial and the other in City Hall East (now Ponce City Market) titled "Souls Grown Deep: African American Vernacular Art of the South". Originally pitched to the High Museum of Art, the latter exhibit featured folk art and self-taught art from African-American artists across the American South, curated by local art collector William S. Arnett, and opened to "glowing reviews".

In June 2022, it was announced that Henry Kim would be the new associate vice provost and director of the Museum beginning August 22, 2022.

== Collection and activities ==
The museum's collections comprise more than 25,000 works, and the facility attracts 120,000 visitors annually. In addition to permanent and temporary exhibitions, the museum is a source of educational programming, providing lectures, symposia, workshops, performances, and festivals. The Carlos Museum also operates a teaching laboratory and conservation center, and publishes scholarly catalogues. The museum also brings art, history, and archaeology to the classroom of Georgia children through its outreach program, Art Odyssey. The Carlos Museum also runs Odyssey Online, a Website for school-age children that explores the various cultures reflected in the museum's collections.

The museum's permanent Egyptian holdings were bolstered with the acquisition of 145 works from Canada's Niagara Falls Museum in 1999. The elaborately decorated ancient coffins and mummies of both humans and animals form the centerpiece of the permanent exhibition of ancient Egyptian art. Also in 1999, Carlos bequeathed a $10 million gift specifically for the purchase of ancient Greek and Roman pieces. As a result, the museum now owns and exhibits the finest existing portrait of the Roman emperor Tiberius and one of the country's best examples of Hellenistic sculpture, a depiction of Terpsichore, the Greek muse of dance. A total of 450 works of art are now on display in galleries devoted to Greek and Roman art.

In 1999, the Carlos Museum purchased an unidentified male mummy that some thought could be a New Kingdom pharaoh. Through research and collaboration with Emory University medical experts, museum scholars were able to identify the mummy as pharaoh Ramesses I. The museum returned the mummy to Egypt in 2003 as a gift of goodwill and international cultural cooperation. His remains are permanently on display in a plexiglass case at the Luxor Museum.

On June 6, 2006 the museum purchased a headless statue of Venus, for $968,000 at a Sotheby's auction in New York. A private collector in Houston, Texas, agreed to sell to whoever purchased the body, the head as well, which was last documented attached to the body in 1836. The head was sold for an additional $50,000.

== Controversy over acquisitions ==
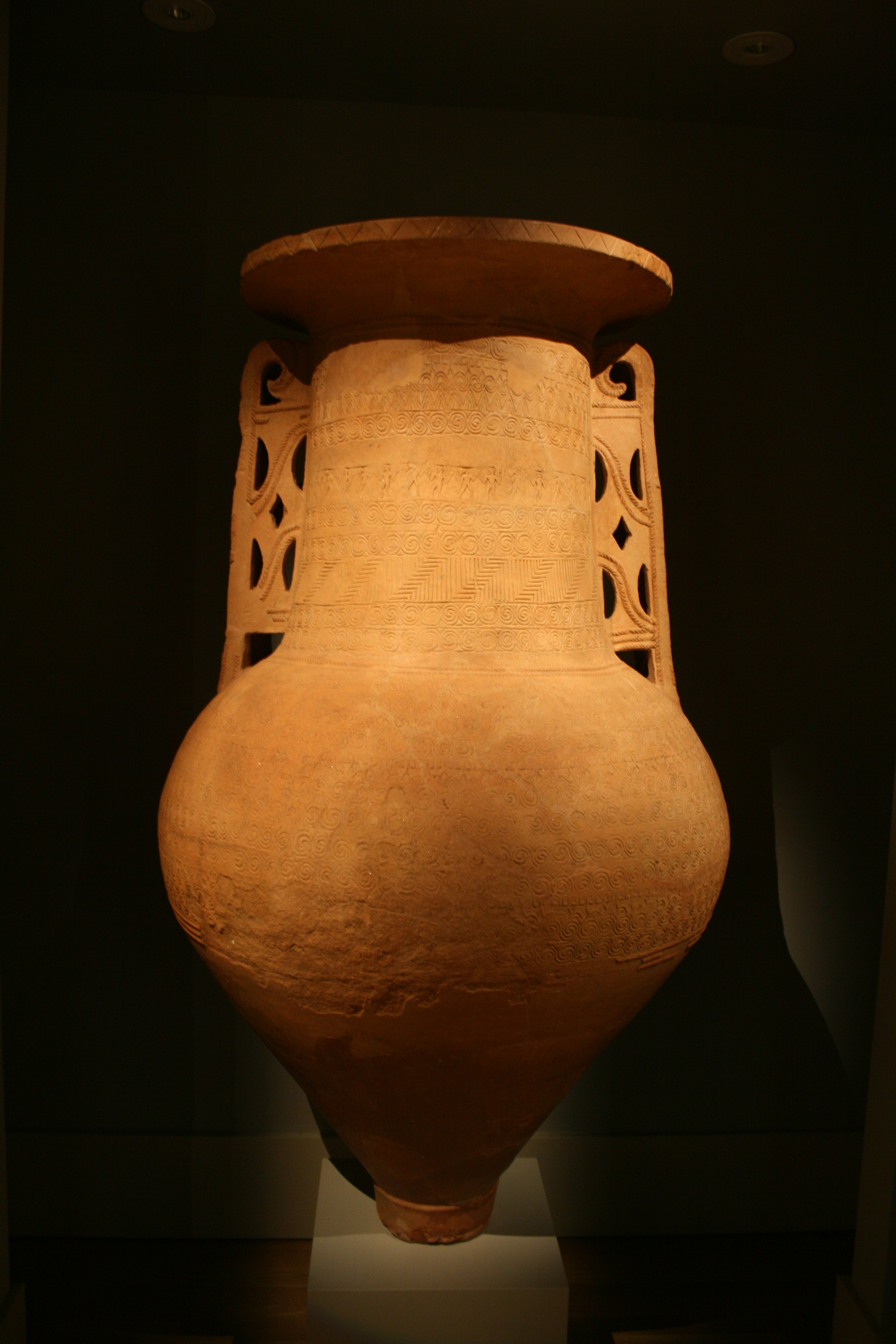
A pithos in the Michael C. Carlos Museum, whose provenance has been identified as suspect.

In 2023, an investigation by the Chronicle of Higher Education alleged that at least 562 artworks in the museum collection are alleged to have had sellers linked by authorities to the illicit antiquities trade. Cynthia Patterson, professor of art history at Emory, stated that “The problem is much more than ‘several objects’; it’s everywhere.” Christos Tsirogiannis, an expert on the illegal trade in antiquities at Ionian University, Greece, stated that the museum had failed to exercise "due diligence" in relation to suspicious acquisitions. David Gill, an archaeologist at the University of Kent stated that the museum had "just turned a blind eye" to issues of provenance in its programme of acquisitions. The Chronicle reported that Jasper Gaunt, the museum's curator of Greek and Roman antiquities between 2001 and 2018, who spearheaded acquisitions funded by the $10 million gift made by Carlos in 1999, was a close associate Robert E. Hecht, a noted figure in the trade in illegal antiquities. 34 or more vases, figurines, and other artefacts acquired by the museum in this period were bought from Hecht directly or had previously been handled by him. The museum also purchased an inscribed funerary stele from Hecht in 2003, which was judged to be a modern forgery by an independent expert.

Between 2002 and 2006, the Carlos acquired 52 or more items linked to Fritz Burki and son, a pair of conservators based in Zurich, who are known to have held illegal antiquities and admitted to acting as a fence for Hecht. A headless statue bought in 2003 was provenanced to Gianfranco Becchina, an antiquities' dealer from Sicily, who was raided for illegal trafficking of antiquities in 2002. The museum also acquired at least ten items from his wife, Ursula "Rosie" Becchina, between 2002 and 2006. 23 artefacts acquired between 2001 and 2022, including a large Minoan pithos, came from or had been previously handled by Phoenix Ancient Art, a dealer which was charged with misrepresenting the origins of various artefacts it traded during that period. In 2015, the museum's registrar, Todd Lamkin, wrote in an email to a member of the Emory faculty that "We tread a fine line when it comes to discussing provenance. Our donors often ask for our discretion, and even when we do know a lengthy history on an object, we often only know this by word of mouth and have little on paper."

In November 2023, The Ministry of Culture of the Republic of Italy and Emory University announced that they reached an agreement for cultural cooperation which includes the restitution to the Ministry of five objects in the collection of the Michael C. Carlos Museum at Emory, with three of the objects remaining on loan to Emory.

In 2023, the Michael C. Carlos Museum returned an Assyrian ivory furniture applique to the government of Iraq following research which revealed that it had been looted from the Iraq Museum in 2006. On January 22, 2024, Emory University and the Ministry of Culture of the Hellenic Republic signed a long-term agreement of cultural cooperation, under which the museum returned a Minoan larnax, a statue of Terpsichore, and a statue of a seated figure, which were alleged to have been looted from Greece in the early 2000s. The agreement also provided for more educational opportunities for students.
