= Nellie Mae Rowe =

African-American artist (1900–1982)

- Self portrait
- Born: July 4, 1900; Fayette County, Georgia
- Died: October 18, 1982 (aged 82); Vinings, Georgia
- Known for: Drawing, Painting, Sculpture, Mixed Media, Collage, Photography
- Movement: Contemporary Art, Folk Art

Nellie Mae Rowe (July 4, 1900 – October 18, 1982) was an African-American artist from Fayette County, Georgia. Although she is best known today for her colorful works on paper, Rowe worked across mediums, creating drawings, collages, altered photographs, hand-sewn dolls, home installations and sculptural environments. She was said to have an "instinctive understanding of the relation between color and form." Her work focuses on race, gender, domesticity, African-American folklore, and spiritual traditions.

Rowe is now recognized as one of the most important American folk artists. Her work is held in numerous collections, including The Metropolitan Museum of Art, The Brooklyn Museum, the Morgan Library and Museum, the American Folk Art Museum in New York City, the Baltimore Museum of Art, the Dallas Museum of Art, the Ogden Museum of Southern Art in New Orleans, Louisiana, the High Museum of Art in Atlanta, Georgia, the Milwaukee Art Museum in Milwaukee, Wisconsin, the Minneapolis Institute of Art, the Museum of Fine Arts, Houston, the Museum of International Folk Art in Santa Fe, New Mexico, the Smithsonian American Art Museum in Washington, D.C., the Schomburg Center for Research in Black Culture in New York City, and the Studio Museum in Harlem.

== Life ==
Born on July 4, 1900, Rowe grew up in the farming community of Fayetteville, Georgia. She was one of ten children. It was noted that she began drawing at an early age. Her family was burdened by financial pressures and she left school after the fourth grade to work in the fields with her father, a former slave, Sam Williams. In addition to managing the rented family farm, her father worked as a blacksmith and basket weaver. Her mother, Luelle Swanson, was an expert seamstress and a quilter. Rowe's mother taught her to create dolls, quilts and small wooden sculptures.

When Rowe was 16, she ran away from the farm because she found the work to be "painful, poorly compensated and undignified." Rowe married Ben Wheat right after leaving the family farm. The couple remained in Fayetteville until 1930, when they moved to Vinings, Georgia, a small rural community northwest of Atlanta. In Vinings, Rowe was employed as a domestic worker. In 1936, her husband died from cardiovascular renal disease.

Rowe met her second husband, Henry 'Buddy' Rowe, an older widower and fellow Vinings resident, in 1937. In 1939, the couple built a home together that Rowe called her "playhouse." It was located at 2041 Paces Ferry Road. When Henry died nine years later, Rowe, then forty-eight, devoted her full attention to art making.

Over the span of the next three decades, Rowe developed a large body of multifaceted work. In the final decade of her life, her art was shown at local and national galleries and museum. In November 1981, she was diagnosed with multiple myeloma. On October 18, 1982, after spending her final weeks in the hospital, Rowe died. She is buried in the Flat Rock A.M.E. Cemetery in Fayetteville, Georgia.

== Work ==
=== The Playhouse ===
Rowe's living space – her home and yard – served as her first canvas and installation project. Adorned with dozens of objects, from dolls and stuffed animals to household bric-a-brac, her home emerged as a site of transformation. There, recycled and discarded materials became works of art. Scraps of wood and chewing gum became dolls and sculptures. Her adornment of her home brought her into conflict with members of her community over the years. Some members of the community would deface or cause damage to her house and work.

Years later, while describing her artistic process, Rowe stated, "I started doing it way ago, right after my husband died. He died in '48 and then people just started to bring in this, bring in the dolls, and bringing me things. I take nothing, you know, take nothing and make something out of it."

Notably, Rowe described her elaborately decorated two-room cottage and yard as her "playhouse." It was a place for creation – for play. Years later, she said "I enjoy playing. I ain't trying to keep house now, I'm just a-playing house. I just got my playhouse like I'm come back a baby again." For Rowe, it was here, in the playhouse, where her creative obsessiveness could flourish.

One visitor, who first saw Rowe's house in 1979, later recalled, "It was a densely packed hodgepodge environment that would make your mouth fall open. Everyone from architects to the local deliveryman who stop and stare, because it was an astounding creation."

Rowe's house was dismantled and eventually torn down after her death in 1982. A hotel now stands on the site. A plaque commemorates where the alternate world of play and production that once stood.

=== Drawings and paintings ===
Through inventive use of color, space, and form, Rowe realized fantasy-like landscapes in her drawings and paintings. While her early works focused on a single subject, later works exhibit more complicated compositions. Describing Rowe's "masterly" multi-figured works from 1980 and 1981, Kogan notes that "figures generally interact and merge organically; negative space often invites other forms, and every available space is occupied either by images or decorative patterning or both. The viewer's eye literally dances around the composition at a lively, rhythmical pace."

Throughout her body of work is an unflagging focus on narrative. Rowe sought to recreate scenes from her daily life, memories, and dreams. Paying "equal attention to scenes of everyday life and to fantasy," she composed "naturalistic scenes" and scenes, which sought to merge "the everyday with the fantastic."

This merging of real and fantasy often represented itself in Rowe's shapes. While human and animal shapes are repeated throughout Rowe's works, she often created "hybrid figures such as dog/human, a cow/woman, a dog with wings, and a butterfly/bird/woman." Rowe's original use of space and perspective further reinforce the imaginative and whimsical qualities of her work. Eschewing realistic constraints of scale, her figures often seem to float in space.

Throughout her two-dimensional works, she incorporated common religious imagery, like the cross, or faith-based texts. A member of the African Methodist Church, Rowe was a deeply spiritual and religious Christian. Across some of her canvas she wrote, "Beleave in God and He Will Make A Way Far You" or "God Bless My House." She said, "Drawing is the only thing I think is good for the Lord" and attributed her artistic talent to God. Additionally, some scholars have located her depiction of "haints" or spirits in broader African-American spiritual traditions, which accepted the presence of voodoo spirits.

=== Sculptures and photographs ===
Rowe's sculptures often took the form of dolls or bust-like figures, made out of old stockings or hardened chewing gum. Rowe adorned her dolls, made out of old stockings, with elaborate outfits and yarn wigs and glasses. For her chewing gum sculptures, she would knead used chewing gum into small figures, harden them in her freezer and then paint them with colorfully bright details.

Rowe's altered photographs reflect her facility in using multiple mediums to create sympathetic portraits of close friends and families. By coloring in particular objects or figures or by adding a patterned frame, Rowe repurposed traditional black and white portraits for her own artistic purposes.

Rowe's work was included in the 2025 exhibition Photography and the Black Arts Movement, 1955–1985 at the National Gallery of Art.

== Reception ==
While many of Rowe's neighbors first regarded Rowe's outlandish creative displays with a suspicion, by the 1970s, 2041 Paces Ferry Road had become a prominent local attraction. Between May 27, 1973, and March 15, 1975, over eight hundred people had signed her "guest book."

Following a shift in American folk art history, art students and collectors in the 1980s not only began to notice living artists and craftsmen around the country, but also began to seek them out. Notably, on November 9, 1974, Herbert Haide Hemphill Jr., the prominent folk art curator and collector, noted after visiting Rowe's playhouse, "What a wonderful time!"

During final years of her life, Rowe's artistic career culminated in nationwide attention and considerable financial success. The Atlanta Historical Society 1976 exhibit, "Missing Pieces: Georgia Folk Art 1770-1976", marked Rowe's debut. It was here that Judith Alexander, a young art enthusiast and collector, first met Nellie Mae Rowe. The encounter had a lasting impact. Alexander represented Rowe and promoted her artwork nationwide for the remainder of her life.

In 1978, after the Nexus Gallery included Rowe's pieces in "Viscera," a group exhibition of contemporary and folk art, the Alexander Gallery in Atlanta launched Rowe's first one-woman show. The next year, the Parsons/Dreyfus Gallery mounted Rowe's first-ever New York show.

Notably, in 1982, after being featured in numerous prominent galleries in cities including New Orleans and Chicago, Rowe's work was included in the landmark 1982 exhibit "Black Folk Art in America, 1930-1980" at the Corcoran Gallery of Art in Washington, D.C.

Posthumously, Rowe's work continues to enjoy remarkable success. Four years after her death, The Studio Museum in Harlem exhibited "Nellie Mae Rowe: An American Folk Artist." In 1989, the Guerilla Girls, an anonymous group of feminist, female artists, recognized Nellie Mae Rowe along the ranks of the Frida Kahlo, Edmonia Lewis, and Georgia O'Keeffe. And finally, in 1999, the American Folk Art Museum mounted "The Art of Nellie Mae Rowe: Ninety-Nine and Half Won't Do."

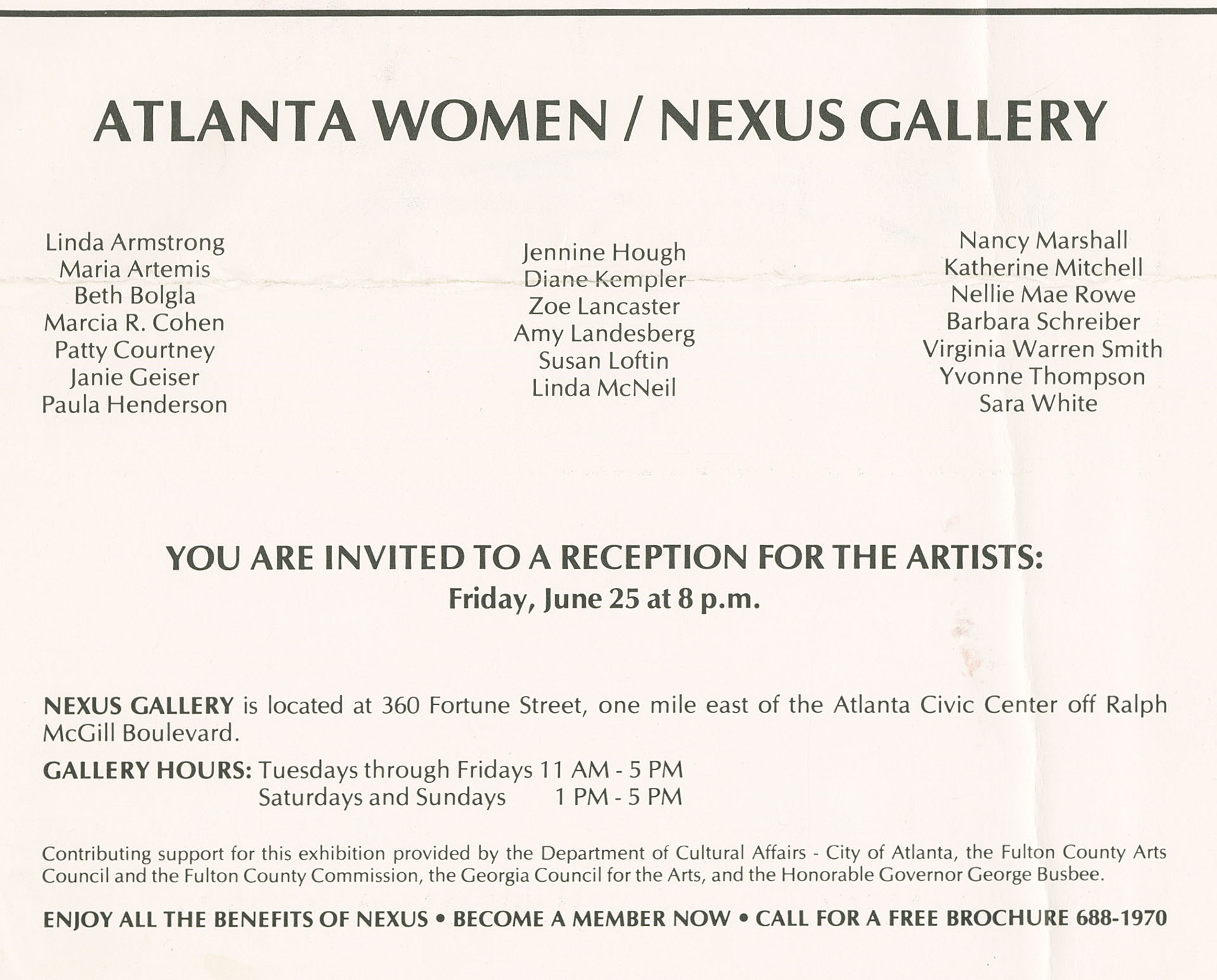
Nexus Gallery Exhibition Announcement

In 2014, the High Museum of Art in Atlanta, showed “Nellie Mae Rowe: At Night Things Come to Me.”

In 2023, a documentary, titled "This World is Not My Own: The Limitless Story of Nellie Mae Rowe", was showcased at the Atlanta Jewish Film Festival. The film traces the lifespan of Nellie Mae Rowe, along with her relationship with Judith Alexander.

== Exhibitions ==
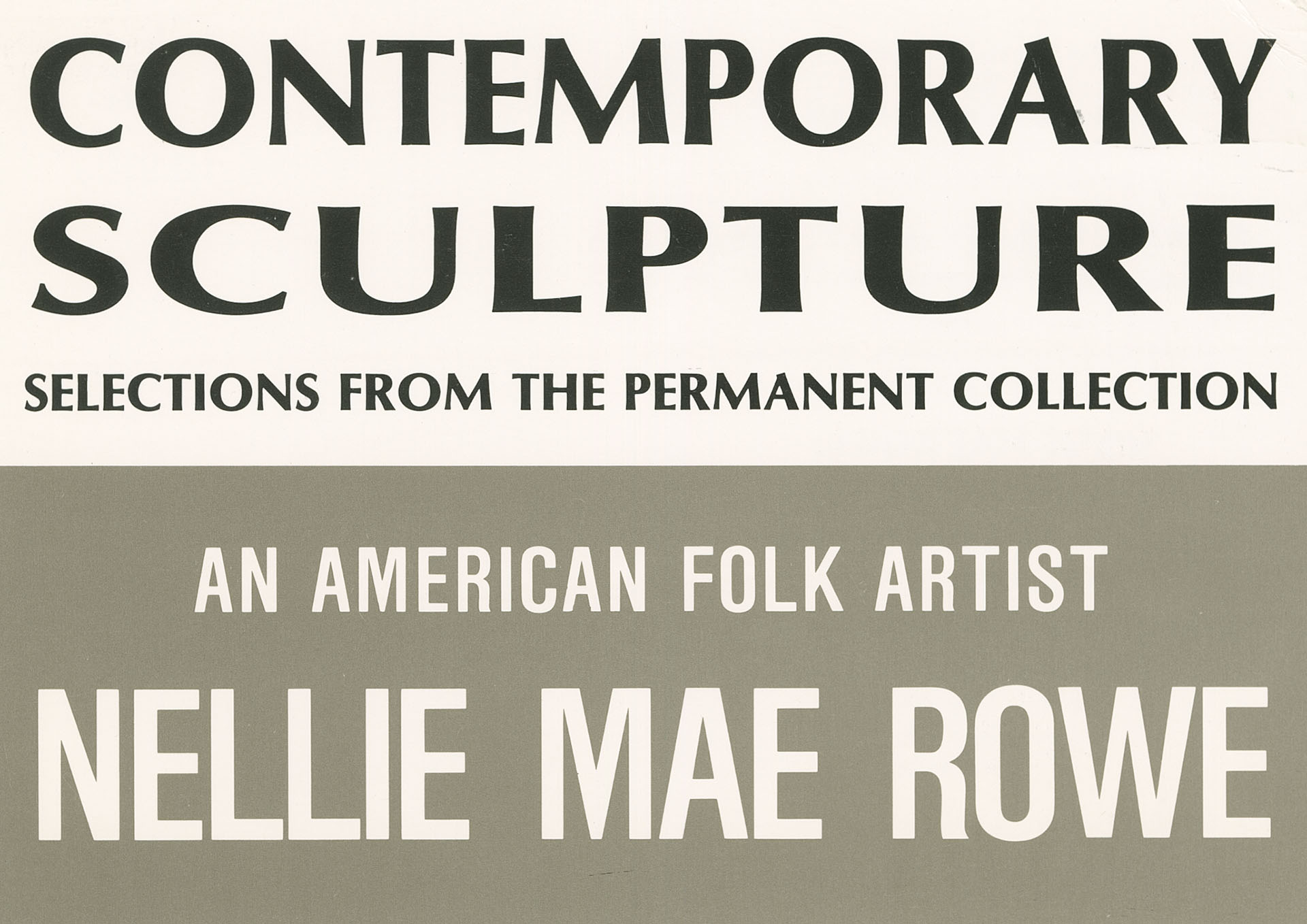
The Studio Museum in Harlem Exhibition Announcement

- Alexander Gallery, Atlanta, GA, 1978–1982.
- Parsons-Dreyfuss Gallery, New York, NY, 1979.
- Hammer & Hammer American Folk Art Gallery, Chicago, IL, 1982.
- Spelman College, Atlanta, GA, 1982.
- Knoxville World's Fair, Folklife Pavilion, Knoxville, TN, 1982.
- Phoenix Art Gallery, Atlanta, GA, 1982.
- Atlanta Women, Nexus Gallery, Atlanta, GA, June 25 - August 8, 1982.
- Nellie Mae Rowe: Visionary Artist, 1900-1982, Lamar Dodd Art Center, LaGrange College, LaGrange, GA, January 1983.
- Nellie Mae Rowe: An American Folk Artist, The Studio Museum of Harlem, New York, NY, October 12 - December 28, 1986.
- Nellie Mae Rowe, Morris Museum of Art, Augusta, GA, 1996.
- The Art of Nellie Mae Rowe: “Ninety-Nine and a Half Won’t Do”, National Museum of Women in the Arts, Washington, DC
- Really Free: The Radical Art of Nellie Mae Rowe, the High Museum of Art, Atlanta, Georgia, September 3, 2021 – January 9, 2022.
- Called To Create: Black Artists of the American South, National Gallery of Art, Washington, DC, September 18, 2022 – March 26, 2023.

== Quotes ==
"I don't know what he put me here for, but he got me here for something 'cause I don't draw like nobody. You speak one way, but I come on and say it different. You can draw a mule, dog, cat, or a human person, I'm going to draw it different. 'Cause you always see things different."

== Sources ==
- Nellie Mae Rowe, The American Folk Art Museum
- Lee Kogan and Nellie Mae Rowe, The Art of Nellie Mae Rowe: Ninety Nine and a Half Won’t Do (New York: Museum of American Folk Art, 1998)
- Karen Towers Klacsmann, Nellie Mae Rowe (1900-1982), New Georgia Encyclopedia
- Nellie Mae Rowe in Judith Alexander Foundation
- William Arnett, "Nellie Mae Rowe (1900-1982): Inside the Perimeter" in Souls Grown Deep: African American Vernacular Art edited by Paul Arnett and William Arnett (Atlanta, Georgia: Tinwood Books, 2000)
- Joyce Cohen, Nellie Mae Rowe lecture, March 11, 2010 at the High Museum
- Erika Doss, "Nellie Mae Rowe (1900-1982)" in Coming Home!: Self-taught Artists, the Bible, and the American South edited by Carol Crown (Memphis, Tennessee: Art Museum of the University of Memphis: 2004)
- Nellie Mae Rowe, The Brooklyn Museum
