= Thornton Dial =

American artist (1928–2016)

- Born: September 28, 1928; Emelle, Alabama, U.S.
- Died: January 25, 2016 (aged 87); McCalla, Alabama, U.S.
- Known for: Assemblage paintings, sculpture
- Spouse: Clara Mae Murrow

Thornton Dial (September 28, 1928 – January 25, 2016) was a pioneering American artist who came to prominence in the late 1980s. Dial's body of work exhibits formal variety through expressive, densely composed assemblages of found materials, often executed on a monumental scale. His range of subjects embraces a broad sweep of history, from human rights to natural disasters and current events. Dial's works are widely held in American museums; ten of Dial's works were acquired by the Metropolitan Museum of Art in 2014.

== Biography ==
Thornton Dial was born in 1928 to a teenage mother, Mattie Bell, on a former cotton plantation in Emelle, Alabama, where relatives in his extended family worked as sharecroppers. He lived with his mother until he was around three when Dial and his half-brother Arthur moved in with their second cousin, Buddy Jake Dial, who was a farmer. When Thornton moved in with Buddy Jake, he farmed and learned about the sculptures that Buddy Jake made from items lying around the yard, an experience that influenced him. Dial grew up in poverty and without the presence of his father.

In 1940, when he was twelve, Dial moved to Bessemer, Alabama. When he arrived in Bessemer, he noticed the art along the way in people's yards and was amazed at the level of craft exhibited. He married Clara Mae Murrow in 1951. They have five children, one of whom died of cerebral palsy. The late artist Ronald Lockett was his cousin.

His principal place of employment was as a metalworker at the Pullman Standard Plant in Bessemer, Alabama, which made railroad cars. The plant closed its doors in 1981. After the Pullman factory shut down, Dial began to dedicate himself to his art for his own pleasure.

In 1987 Thornton Dial met Lonnie Holley, an artist who introduced Dial to Atlanta collector and art historian William Arnett. Arnett, whose art historical interests had now focused on African-American vernacular art and artists, brought Dial's work to national prominence. The art historian has also brought Lonnie Holley, the Gee's Bend Quilters and many others to the attention of the United States. Arnett, with Jane Fonda also helped to create a publishing company, in 1996, along with his sons Paul and Matt. He is also the founder and Chairman Emeritus of the Souls Grown Deep Foundation, an organization dedicated to the preservation and documentation of African American art.

Dial's work has been continually heralded in international cultural institutions and large survey exhibitions, such as the 2000 Whitney Biennial. Over time, the context for Dial's work has expanded to showcase the political and social responsiveness of his artwork, expressing "ideas about black history, slavery, racial discrimination, urban and rural poverty, industrial or environmental collapse, and spiritual salvation". Since 2011 the language surrounding Dial's artwork and practice has shifted. This change in perception was the result of the first touring retrospective of Dial's work curated by art historian and cultural critic Joanne Cubbs for the Indianapolis Museum of Art. In reviews of this exhibition, Dial received unprecedented recognition in the national press, which, for the first time, positioned him as a bonafide contemporary artist. For example, Karen Wilkin of The Wall Street Journal called Dial's work “first-rate, powerful Art–with a capital ‘A.’” Later, the Journal also named the Dial retrospective one of the best museum shows of 2011, alongside showings of such major art world luminaries as Degas, Picasso, Kandinsky and Willem de Kooning.

In another 2011 review of the Hard Truths exhibition, art and architecture critic Richard Lacayo published a four-page story on Dial in Time Magazine, arguing that Dial's work should not be pigeon-holed into the narrowly-defined category of "outsider art":

Dial's work has sometimes been described as "outsider art", a term that attempts to cover the product of everyone from naive painters like Grandma Moses to institutionalized lost souls like Martín Ramírez and full-bore obsessives like Henry Darger, the Chicago janitor... But if there's one lesson to take away from "Hard Truths: The Art of Thornton Dial," a triumphant new retrospective at the Indianapolis Museum of Art, it's that Dial, 82, doesn't belong within even the broad confines of that category....What he does can be discussed as art, just art, no surplus notions of outsiderness required....And not just that, but some of the most assured, delightful and powerful art around.

In still another response to the Hard Truths exhibition, New York Times reporter Carol Kino described Dial's "work's look, ambition, and obvious intellectual reach hew[ing] closely to that of many other modern and contemporary masters, from Jackson Pollock and Robert Rauschenberg to Jean-Michel Basquiat." Most recently, Alex Greenberger of ARTnews similarly said: "Thornton Dial has been termed an outsider artist, a vernacular artist, and a folk artist—but any of those labels might be a misnomer, since the late painter's work has been gradually moving into the mainstream art world's view in the past few years."

== Work ==
Thornton Dial's work addresses American sociopolitical exigencies such as war, racism, bigotry and homelessness. He draws attention to these themes using the overlooked and under-considered material artifacts of everyday American life. Combining paint and found materials, Dial constructs large-scale assemblages with cast-away objects ranging from rope to bones to buckets. Works such as Black Walk and The Blood of Hard Times, for example, use corrugated tin and other dilapidated pieces of metal to refer to the destitute bodies and vernacular architecture of the rural South. Dial invokes the history of the American rural South throughout much of his work.

The symbol of the tiger is also a primary visual trope in Thornton Dial's oeuvre. Artist and African-American art historian David C. Driskell explained Dial's use of the tiger as an allegory for survival and an implicit reference to the struggle for civil rights in the United States.

In 1993, Dial's work was the subject of a large exhibition that was presented simultaneously at the New Museum of Contemporary Art and the American Folk Art Museum in New York. In 2000, the artist's work was included in the Whitney Biennial, and in 2005–06, the Museum of Fine Arts, Houston, presented a major exhibition entitled "Thornton Dial in the 21st Century," which was followed in 2011–13 by the major touring retrospective "Hard Truths: The Art of Thornton Dial." Dial's works can be found in many notable public and private collections, including those of, among other institutions, the High Museum of Art; the Museum of Fine Arts, Houston; the American Folk Art Museum, New York; the Philadelphia Museum of Art; the Hirshhorn Museum and Sculpture Garden, Washington D.C.; the Smithsonian American Art Museum, Washington D.C.; and the Indianapolis Museum of Art.

In the works made a few years before the artist’s death, Thornton Dial created layered, heavily textured compositions with an array of found materials, such as ash, wire fencing and scrap metal. Caked onto the thick canvases, the objects are almost unrecognizable—towels look like porous coral and curled scrap metal appears clothlike.

On November 24, 2014, The Metropolitan Museum of Art announced that 57 works by contemporary African American artists from the Southern United States—including 10 works by Dial—were donated to the museum by the Souls Grown Deep Foundation from its William S. Arnett Collection. An exhibition devoted to the gift opened at the Metropolitan Museum on May 22, 2018, and ran until September of that year.

As Sheena Wagstaff, Leonard A. Lauder Chairman of the Department of Modern and Contemporary Art at the Metropolitan Museum, described the gift, "From Thornton Dial's magisterial constructions to the emblematic compositions by the Gee's Bend quilters from the 1930s onwards, this extraordinary group of works contributes immeasurably to the museum's representation of works by contemporary American artists and augments on a historic scale its holdings of contemporary art."

Two of Dial's major works were included in a March 2016 gift to the Virginia Museum of Fine Arts by the president of its board of trustees, William A. Royall, and his wife, Pam. Those works are the iconic, "Old Uncle Buck (The Negro Got to Find Out What's Going On in the United States)," from 2002; and the monumental 2005 sculpture, "Freedom Cloth."

The High Museum of Art in Atlanta had a memorial exhibition, on view February 13 to May 1, 2016, that presented a selection of Dial's exuberant drawings and symbolically rich paintings that the museum has collected over the past twenty years. In April 2016 Marianne Boesky Gallery presented "We All Live Under the Same Old Flag", a show dedicated to Dial since his death. Artsy, the online industry publication, gave the Dial show at Marianne, "We All Live Under the Same Old Flag", top billing among 15 "blockbuster", "must-see" gallery exhibitions on display during the month of May.

In 2018, David Lewis Gallery presented "Mr. Dial's America," a survey of Thornton Dial's work from 1989 - 2011. The show garnered significant press, including a review from the editors of ARTnews, who praised the artist's diverse oeuvre of "early self-portraits as well as paintings treating Jim Crow–era America and the struggle for civil rights, the O.J. Simpson trial, and the site of the World Trade Center after the 9/11 attacks." Writing of the show in the New York Times, Roberta Smith commends "Dial's ability to commandeer any material into a painting," and called the works "fiercely formal in ways that connect to Jackson Pollock's allover fields of dripped paint and the object paintings of Anselm Kiefer and Julian Schnabel."

== Personal life ==
Thornton married Clara Mae Murrow in 1951. At his death he was survived by three sons, Thornton Jr., Richard and Dan, a daughter, Matte Dial, as well as many grandchildren and great-grandchildren. Clara Mae Dial died in 2005.

== Exhibitions ==
Dial's work has been exhibited throughout the United States since 1990. Museum exhibitions include:

2022

- Called To Create: Black Artists of the American South, National Gallery of Art, Washington, DC, September 18, 2022 – March 26, 2023.

2019

- Home is a Foreign Place: Recent Acquisitions in Context, The Metropolitan Museum of Art, New York, NY

2019

- Epic Abstraction: Pollock to Herrera, The Metropolitan Museum of Art, New York, NY

2018

- History Refused to Die: Highlights from the Souls Grown Deep Foundation Gift, The Metropolitan Museum of Art, New York, NY

2017

- Revelations: Art From the African American South, De Young Museum, San Francisco, CA
- Self-Taught Genius, organized by the American Folk Art Museum, New York, NY, travelled to Tampa Museum of Art, Tampa, FL; New Orleans
- Third Space/Shifting Conversations About Contemporary Art, The Birmingham Museum of Art, Birmingham, AL
- Inside the Outside: Five Self Taught Artists from the William Louis Dreyfus Foundation, Katonah Museum of Art, Katonah, NY; The Baker Museum
- Known / Unknown: Private Obsession and Hidden Desire in Outsider Art, Museum of Sex, New York, NY

2016

- Green Pastures: In Memory of Thornton Dial Sr., High Museum of Art, Atlanta

2015

- I See Myself in You: Selections from the Collection, Brooklyn Museum, Brooklyn, NY
- Social Geographies: Interpreting Space and Place, curated by Leisa Rundquist, Asheville Museum of Art, Asheville, NC

2014

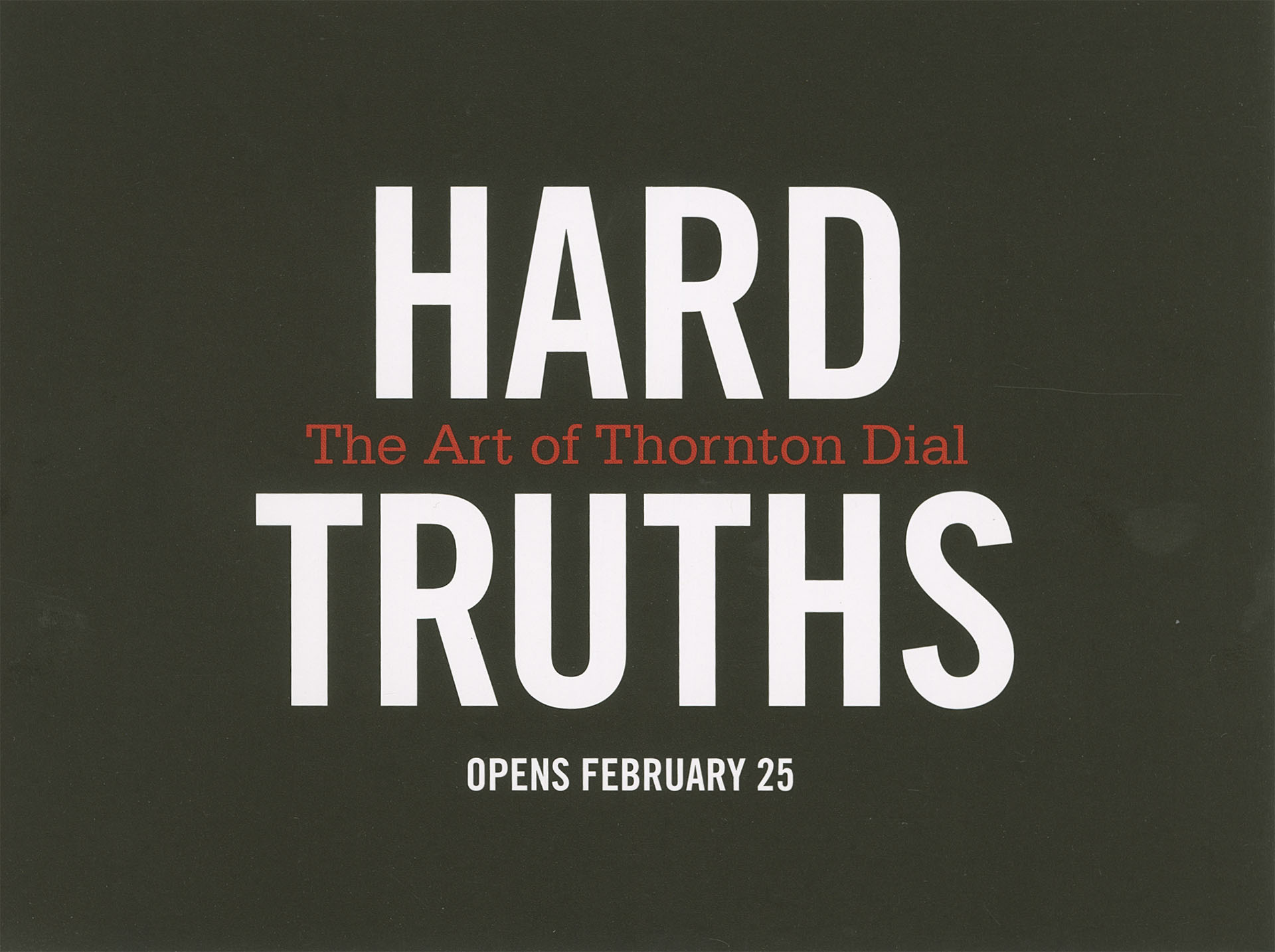
Indianapolis Museum of Art Exhibition Announcement

- When the Stars Begin to Fall: Imagination and the American South, The Studio Museum in Harlem, New York, NY

2011-13

- Hard Truths: The Art of Thornton Dial, Indianapolis Museum of Art (organizing museum); New Orleans Museum of Art, The Mint Museum, and the High Museum of Art
- Thornton Dial: Thoughts on Paper, Ackland Art Museum, The University of North Carolina at Chapel Hill (organizing museum); Fleming Museum of Art, University of Vermont, Burlington; Montgomery Museum of Fine Arts, Montgomery, Alabama; and the Knoxville Museum of Art, Tennessee.

2005

- Thornton Dial in the 21st Century, Museum of Fine Arts, Houston

2002-2004

- In the Spirit of Martin, Smithsonian Institution

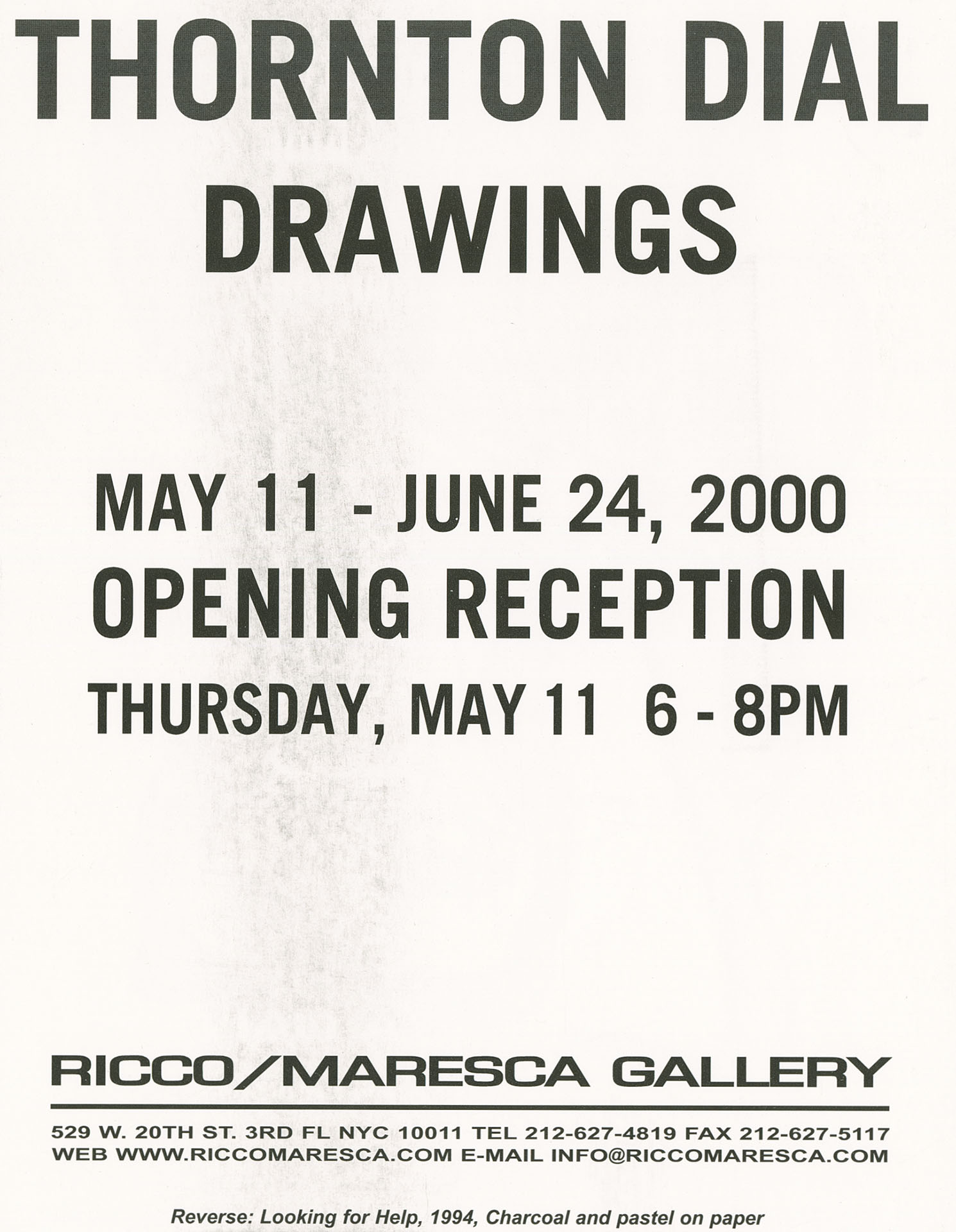
Ricco/Maresca Gallery Exhibition Announcement

2000

- Whitney Biennial, Whitney Museum of American Art, New York
- Thornton Dial: Drawings, Ricco/Maresca Gallery, New York, NY, May 11 – June 24, 2000

1998

- Self-Taught Artists of the 20th Century: An American Anthology, Philadelphia Museum

1997

- The Hirshhorn Collects: Recent Acquisitions 1992 - 1996, Hirshhorn Museum and Sculpture Garden, Smithsonian Institution, Washington, D.C.

1993

- Thornton Dial: Image of the Tiger, New Museum of Contemporary Art, New York; American Folk Art Museum, New York; American Center, Paris
- Passionate Visions of the American South: Self -Taught Artists from 1940 to the Present, New Orleans Museum of Art, New Orleans

== Public collections ==
- Ackland Art Museum, Chapel Hill, NC
- American Folk Art Museum, New York, NY
- Birmingham Museum of Art, Birmingham, AL
- Brooklyn Museum of Art, New York, NY
- Clark Atlanta University Art Museum, Atlanta, GA
- Dallas Museum of Art, Dallas, TX
- de Young Museum of Art, Fine Arts Museums of San Francisco, San Francisco, CA
- Flint Institute of Arts, Flint, MI
- Gadsden Arts Center and Museum
- Georgia Museum of Art, Athens, GA
- Harvard Art Museums, Cambridge, MA
- High Museum of Art, Atlanta, GA
- Hirshhorn Museum and Sculpture Garden, Washington D.C.
- Hunter Museum of American Art, Chattanooga, TN
- Indianapolis Museum of Art, Indianapolis, IN
- Indiana University Art Museum, Bloomington, IN
- Intuit: The Center for Intuitive and Outsider Art, Chicago, IL
- The Metropolitan Museum of Art, New York, NY
- Milwaukee Art Museum, Milwaukee, WI
- Minneapolis Institute of Art, Minneapolis, MN
- Minnesota Museum of American Art, St. Paul, MN
- Montgomery Museum of Fine Arts, Montgomery, AL
- The Morgan Library & Museum, New York, NY
- Museum of Fine Arts, Boston, Boston, MA
- Museum of Fine Arts, Houston, TX
- Museum of Modern Art (MoMA), New York, NY
- National Gallery of Art, Washington, DC
- Philadelphia Museum of Art, Philadelphia, PA
- Rockford Art Museum, Rockford, IL
- Smithsonian American Art Museum, Washington D.C.
- Spelman College Museum of Fine Art, Atlanta, GA
- Studio Museum, Harlem
- Virginia Museum of Fine Arts, Richmond, VA
- Virginia Union University, Richmond, VA
- Whitney Museum of American Art, New York, NY

=== Public art ===
- Road to the Mountaintop (sculpture) (2014), Nashville, TN
- The Bridge (sculpture) (1997), Atlanta, GA
