= Bardon Hill =

Natural landmark in Leicestershire, England

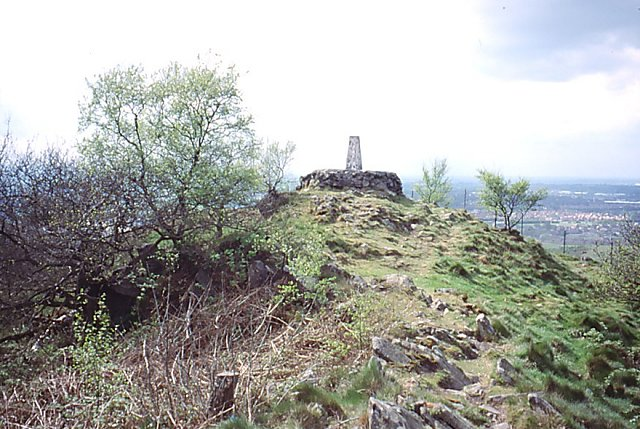

Highest point
- Elevation: 278 m (912 ft)
- Prominence: 172 m (564 ft)
- Listing: Marilyn, HuMP, TuMP (200-299m), Historic County Top, Current County/UA Top, Administrative County Top, Clem (Ma,Hu,Tu,2,CoH,CoU,CoA,Cm)(Tu,4,Cm)
- Coordinates: 52°42′52″N 1°19′14″W

Geography
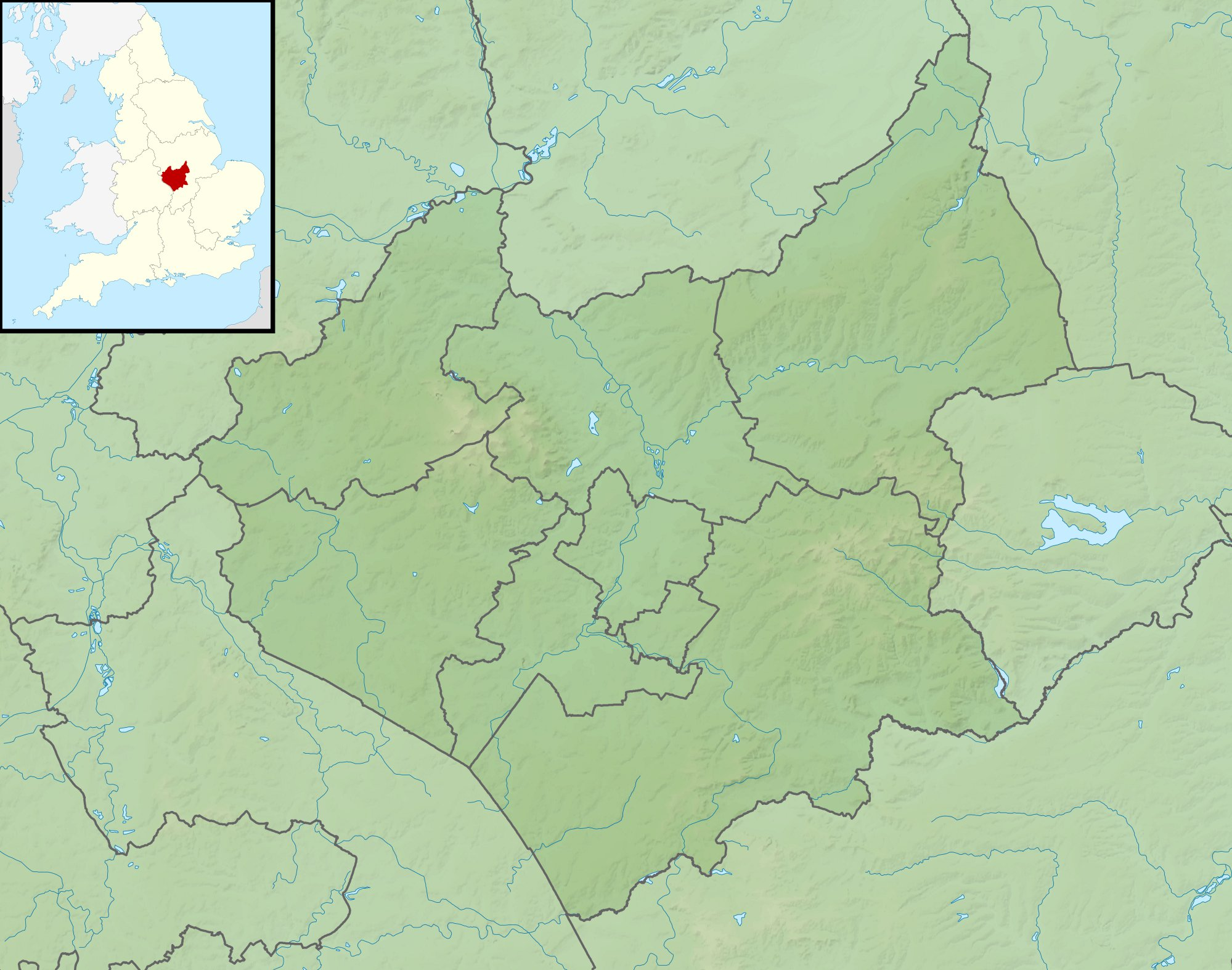
- Location within Leicestershire
- Location: Bardon, Leicestershire, England
- OS grid: SK 459131
- Topo map: OS (1:50k) 119 (1:25k) OL24W

Bardon Hill is the highest hill in Leicestershire, at 278 metres (912 ft). The hill is also a 13.1-hectare (32-acre) biological Site of Special Scientific Interest and has been noted in literature.

The second highest hill in Leicestershire is the nearby Beacon Hill.

== History ==
Bardon Hill was one of the twenty-three principal survey points along a meridional arc from Dunnose used in the Principal Triangulation of Great Britain to establish a precise datum for geodetic calculations and from which maps could be drawn.

"Bardon" or "Bardon Hill" was also the name of a village south-west of the hill. Most of the village was demolished in the 1990s to allow expansion of the quarry, but the toponym "Bardon Hill" remains in use as the postal address of the remaining local properties.

The landscape was already attracting visitors before John Curtis wrote in the 1830s: he suggests that the view extends to over 5,000 square miles (13,000 km^{2}) or one-twelfth of England and Wales. Potter also notes the view from Bardon Hill:

It probably commands a greater extent of surface than any other point of view on the island. [...] An outline, described from the extremity of this view, would include nearly one-fourth of England and Wales. It may be deemed one of the most extraordinary points of view in Nature.

This has attracted telecommunication companies, and large transmitters and radio masts have replaced both the Summer House and Queen Adelaide's Bower.

=== Royal visit ===
In 1840, the then deer park was chosen as a picnic spot for a visit by Queen Adelaide, the Queen Dowager. T. R. Potter describes the Royal scene in The History of Charnwood Forest:

Her Majesty, in a dress of elegant simplicity suited to the occasion, supported by Earl Howe, and her Royal sister (the Duchess of Saxe Weimar) by Lord Curzon, ascended the steep with great apparent ease. On arriving at the summit, upwards of an hour was spent in the enjoyment of the wonderful prospect, of which her Majesty frequently expressed her admiration – Lord Howe pointing out the many remarkable near and distinct objects which the fineness of the day brought within the reach of view.

The Queen's repast was laid out on the grass on the east side of the Summer House, but her Majesty, finding the sun oppressive, wished to remove to the adjoining shade – and setting the example, took up the first dish, and was followed by the rest of the party, all bearing some portion of the viands. The place selected by the Queen for the rural banquet has since been named "Adelaide's Bower."

== Ecology ==
Bardon Hill
- Site of Special Scientific Interest
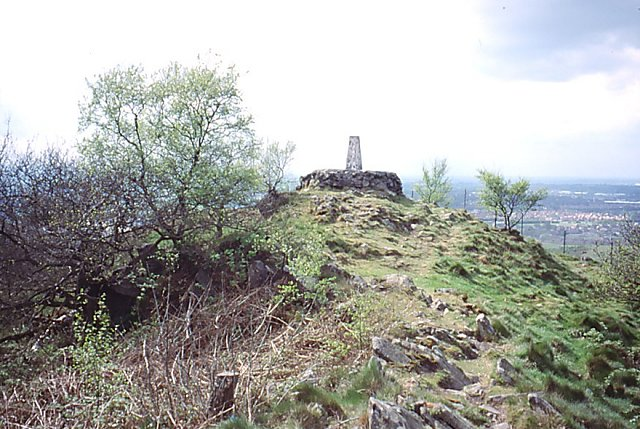
- Location of Bardon Hill.
- Area of search: Leicestershire
- Interest: Biological
- Area: 13.1 hectares
- Notification date: 1983

The hill is a surviving fragment of the formerly extensive Charnwood Forest, and it has both woodland and heath. Mature oak dominates the lower slopes, with pine plantation higher up, and a mixture of heath, acid grassland, rock outcrops and scrub oak at the top. The hill is notable for its lichens and invertebrates, especially spiders with 133 species including the rare Tetrilus macrophthalmus. Bardon Hill is a 13.1-hectare (32-acre) biological Site of Special Scientific Interest (SSSI) in the civil parish of Bardon, east of Coalville in Leicestershire, England.

=== Bardon Park ===
Bardon Park was a medieval deer park, covering about 1,200 acres (490 ha). Bardon Hill was within the area of the park, and also Bardon Hall (see below). It is said that the area was emparked prior to AD 1300. The line of the southerly boundary of the park runs a few metres north of the A 511 road.

There are still deer within the area of Bardon park, as well as foxes and badgers. There are breeding pairs of buzzard and peregrine as well as raven and barn owls.

== Geology ==
Bardon Hill is part of the eroded remains of a volcano. It is the highest point in Leicestershire and the National Forest, 278 m (912 ft) above sea level. Due to its prominence, it is visible for many kilometres around. It adjoins Bardon Hill Quarry, a geological SSSI. At its summit are a trigonometrical point and a radio mast. The Hill is formed of Neoproterozoic volcanic rocks of the Bardon Hill Volcanic Complex.

The volcanic complex is described as being similar to that of the Soufrière Hills, a Stratovolcano on the British island of Montserrat in the Caribbean. The hill and surrounding land is formed of a mixture of igneous and volcanic rocks formed in the precambrian age (600 million years old); the surrounding areas are overlaid with a mixture of boulder clay and Mercia mudstone.

== Quarry ==
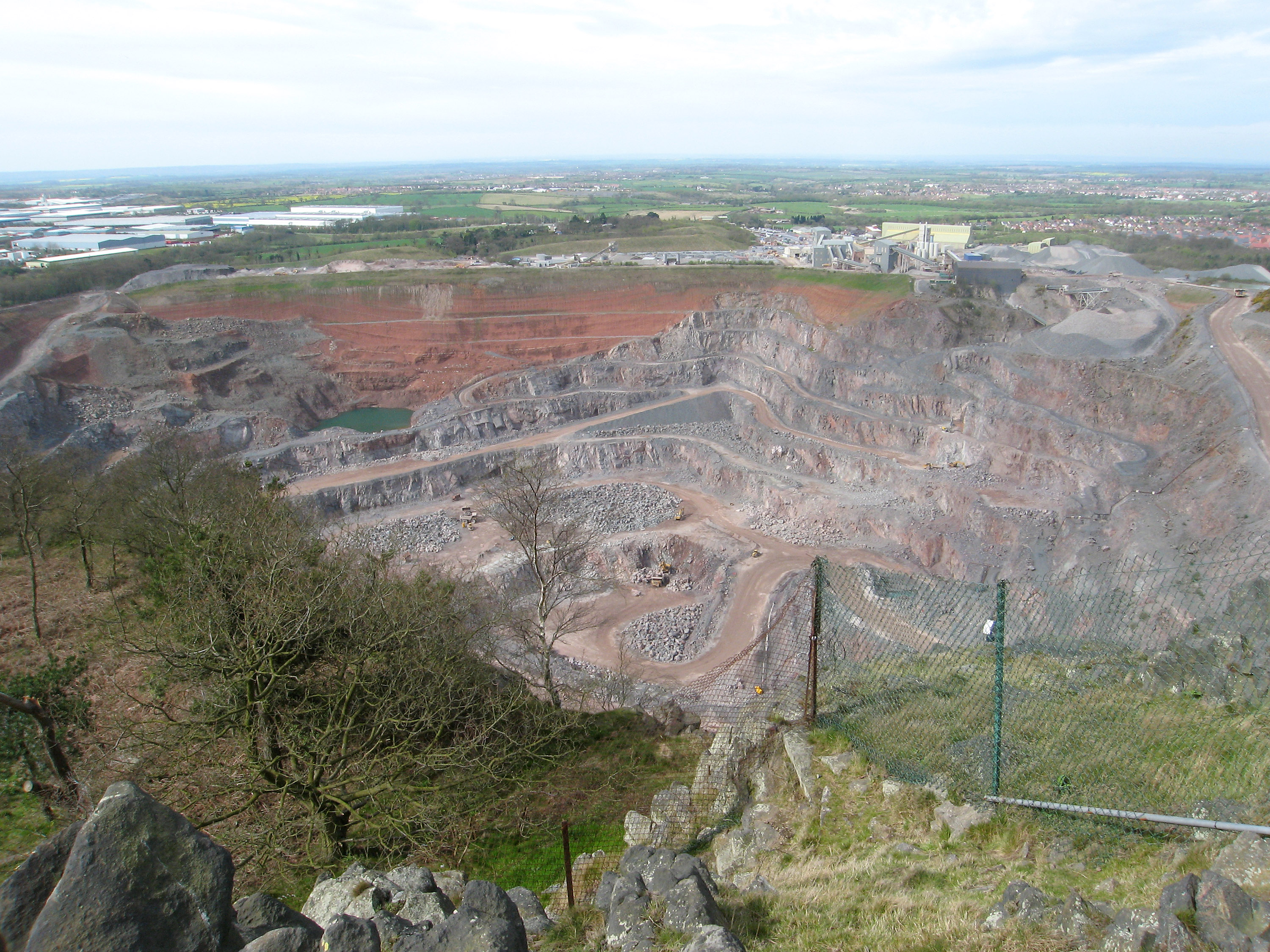
Looking down from the Hill onto Bardon Quarry

The earliest mention of a granite quarry at Bardon Hill was in 1622. A small quarry is shown on a map of 1835, with large scale working starting in 1857.

Commercial exploitation was made possible by several local nonconformist families, and the opening of the Leicester and Swannington Railway. The line passed close to Bardon Hill, and a short branch line was added to allow direct exportation from the quarry to the railway network. The railway was under the influence of local Quakers, the Ellis family, for several generations, before being sold to the Midland Railway whilst under the control of MP John Ellis.

Joseph Ellis II served as Director of the Leicester and Swannington Railway, and formed a partnership with Mr. Breedon Everard of Groby to use the railway as first coal merchants, before extending to granite extraction.

Joseph Ellis II's two sons (James and Joseph III) continued the partnership with Breedon Everard following his death, and, in 1858, leased the Bardon Hill quarries from Robert Jacomb-Hood II of Bardon Hall. The lease was for twenty-one years for a rent of £145 a year.

Following the sale of Bardon Hall by Jacomb-Hood, to William Perry Herrick of Beaumanor Hall, in 1864, Everard and the Ellis' renegotiated the lease of the quarry which allowed it to be developed and mechanised. Leading this mechanisation was the introduction of Charles G Mountain of Birmingham's steam crusher, which cost £7500: it needed only 8 men to operate but produced between 60 and 80 tons of quarried stone per 10-hour day.

The owners of the quarry were paternalistic in nature: At the joint expense of the new owner William Perry Herrick, and the leaseholders, (the Ellis' and Breedon Everard), cottages and a school were built for the quarry's workmen and their families, in the village of Bardon. In 1898 a new parish church was built, and a stipend provided to pay for a clergymen. The architect of St Peter's Church, Bardon, school and houses was Breedon Everard's second son, John Breedon Everard, who had joined the Ellis and Everard firm in 1874. The quarry and its owners offered 'ambitious opportunities for upward social mobility' that were unusual for the time: a quarry labourers on living in one of the cottages in 1881 was a teacher; within the quarry, uneducated labourers rose to positions of high management.

Ellis & Everard, was first listed on the London Stock Exchange in 1988. In 1991 it merged with Evered plc to form Evered Bardon; the name was changed in 1993 to Bardon Group. In 1997 it merged again, this time with Camas (formerly a division of English China Clays), to form Aggregate Industries. In 1999 it entered into a series of major acquisitions in the United States. It was acquired by Holcim, a leading Swiss cement maker, in 2005.

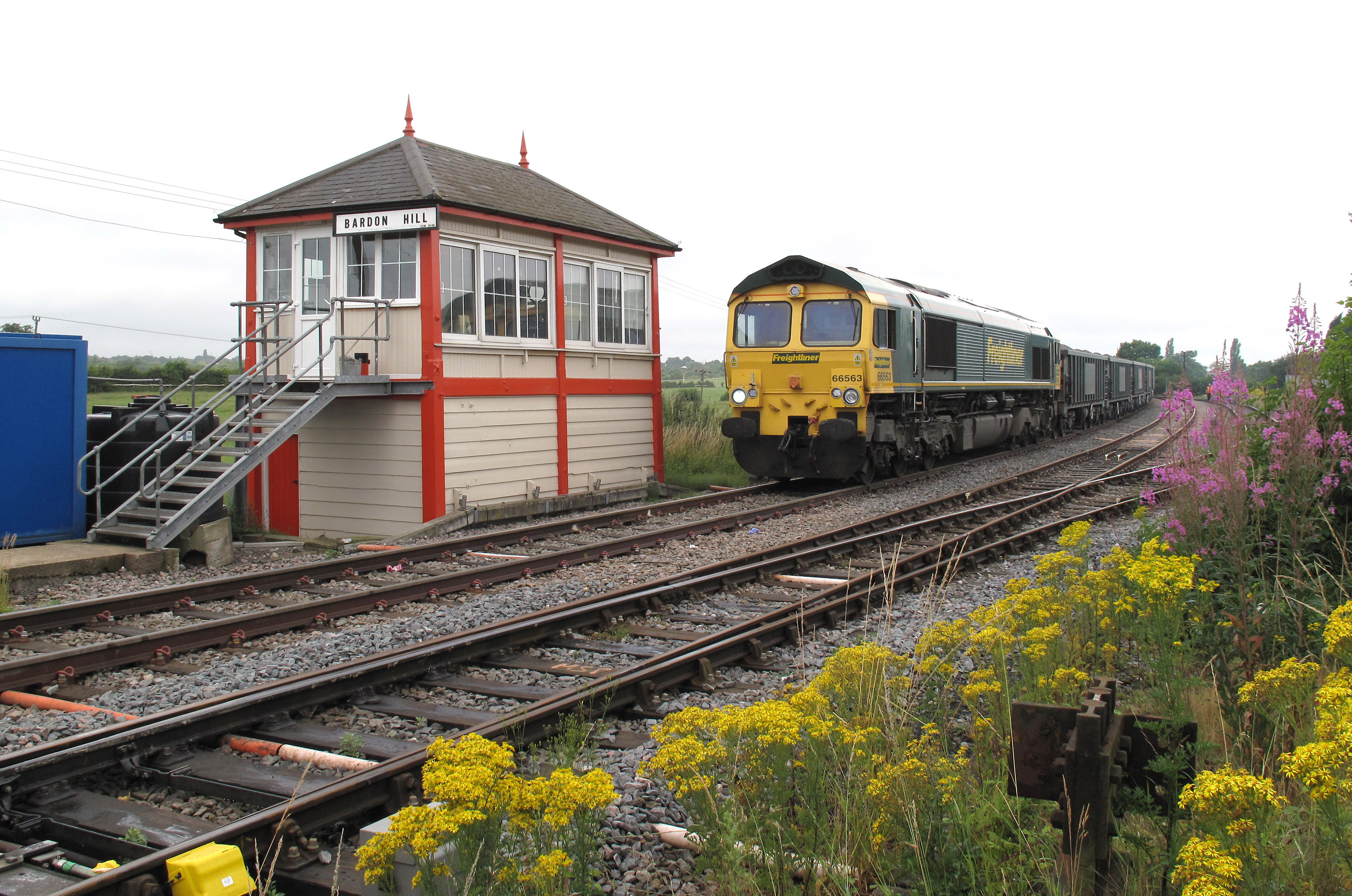
A train loaded with granite chippings from Bardon Hill quarry departs south from the exchange sidings on the former Leicester and Swannington Railway

The Bardon Hill Quarry serves as the headquarters of Aggregate Industries and is one of the 5 "Super-Quarries" it owns in the UK.

In 2009 the company applied to extend the quarry. The existing quarry covers 27 hectares and had a remaining reserve of 30 million tonnes of stone; with a current extraction rate of 3 million tonnes a year, it was expected to be exhausted by 2019. The proposal was to expand the current quarry by 66 hectares (more than trebling the size), allowing the extraction of an additional 132 million tonnes and extending the quarry's lifespan by 40 years. Following the exhaustion of the existing quarry, the company stated it would partially infill the site over a period of around 11 years, and turn it into a nature area.

== Transmission ==
Near the top of the hill are two radio masts; the smaller of the two was built for the BBC as a link for Outside broadcast linking into the Sutton Coldfield Transmitter. This was then moved to the now larger mast which was originally built by an electricity supply company, it is now owned by Cellnex after Arqiva sold its UK wireless business in October 2019 and provides the NOW Leicester DAB radio service. Bardon Hill has a Summits On The Air (SOTA) reference of G/CE-004

== Panorama ==
On a clear day the Malvern and Shropshire Hills (approx. 50–60 miles), summits in Derbyshire (approx. 30–40 miles) and Lincoln Cathedral (almost 50 miles away) can be seen. However, the Sugar Loaf in South Wales, sometimes cited as visible from Bardon, cannot be seen, being over 90 miles (140 km) away.

The following principal hills are visible in perfect visibility (distances in miles):

- N-NE: Silverhill (30)
- NE-E: Beacon Hill (3)
- E-SE: Whatborough Hill (20), Bradgate Park (4)
- SE-S: Honey Hill (25), Arbury Hill (34)
- S-SW: Edge Hill (38), Brailes Hill (47), Ebrington Hill (47), Broadway Hill (53), Oldbury Hill (20)
- SW-W: Worcestershire Beacon (60), Walton Hill (38), The Four Stones (39), Turners Hill (34), Titterstone Clee Hill (58), Barr Beacon (27), Brown Clee Hill (56), Long Mynd (66), Stiperstones (69), The Wrekin (52)
- W-NW: Cannock Chase (27), Cadair Bronwen (87), Ashley Heath (47), Mow Cop (47), Ipstones Edge (35)
- NW-N: The Roaches (43), Merryton Low (40), Axe Edge Moor (45), Wolfscote Hill (35), Chelmorton Low (42), Kinder Scout (52), Bleaklow (56), Masson Hill (30), Back Tor (51)

== See also ==
- Bardon Hall
- Cliffe Hill Mineral Railway
- Bardon, Leicestershire
- Bardon Hill railway station
