= Bardon, Leicestershire =

Civil parish in Leicestershire, England

Coordinates: 52.710°N 1.339°W

Bardon
- Civil parish
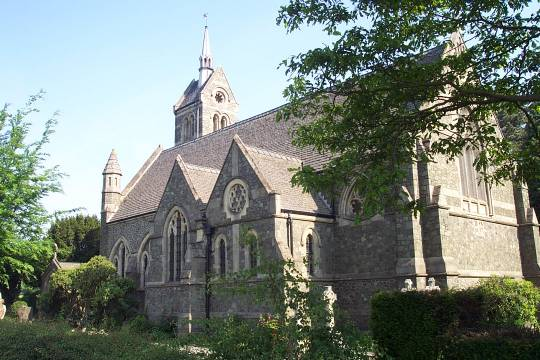
- St Peter's Church, Bardon

- Location within Leicestershire
- Remaining Bardon village area (icon) and civil parish area (red outline)
- Population: 25 (2021 Census)(parish)
- OS grid reference: SK4412
- Civil parish: Bardon
- District: North West Leicestershire
- Shire county: Leicestershire
- Region: East Midlands
- Country: England
- Sovereign state: United Kingdom
- Post town: Coalville
- Postcode district: LE67
- Dialling code: 01530
- Police: Leicestershire
- Fire: Leicestershire
- Ambulance: East Midlands
- UK Parliament: North West Leicestershire

Bardon is a sparsely populated civil parish in North West Leicestershire, England, situated about 1.5 miles (2.4 km) southeast of Coalville. It gives its name to Bardon Hill, which at 912 feet (278 m) above sea level is the county top and highest point in Leicestershire.

The parish is distinct from the neighbouring civil parish of Stanton-under-Bardon, which lies immediately to the southeast across the district boundary in Hinckley and Bosworth. Following the clearance of the former village settlement during the late 20th century for quarry expansion, Bardon functions primarily as an industrial and administrative parish dominated by Bardon Hill Quarry, commercial logistics hubs, and open land surrounding Bardon Hall. The surviving former structures associated with the historic village—including St Peter's Church, the Birch Tree public house, and Bardon Hall—lie outside the present civil parish boundary within the unparished area of Coalville.

== Geography ==
=== Settlement and parish boundary ===
Historically, Bardon was a small quarrying village. During the 1990s, the main village housing was cleared to enable the expansion of Bardon Hill Quarry. As a result, no compact village nucleated centre remains within the parish. The few surviving historic structures associated with the former village, including St Peter's Church, the Birch Tree public house, and Bardon Hall, fall outside the civil parish boundary and are located within the neighbouring unparished area of Coalville.

Today, the civil parish covers an area of approximately 443 hectares (1,090 acres) within North West Leicestershire. It encompasses the extensive open-cast quarry, commercial distribution parks near the A511 road, and rural land south of Bardon Hill. At the 2021 Census, the civil parish recorded a population of 25 residents living in 12 households. Although the parish has a minimal population, the wider Bardon electoral ward takes in the parish, the former village area, and parts of the Greenhill neighbourhood, recording a total population of 2,820 at the 2021 census.

=== Elevation ===
The elevation ranges from lower undulating land near the southern boundary to the summit of Bardon Hill in the north, which reaches an altitude of 278 metres (912 ft). This landmark forms the highest elevation in both Leicestershire and the wider Charnwood Forest area.

=== Geology ===
The underlying geology consists of Neoproterozoic extrusive volcanic rocks of the Charnian Supergroup, dated to around 560 million years ago. The bedrock comprises volcanic breccia, tuffs, and intrusive granodiorite. The high strength and resistance of these rocks have made Bardon a principal center for roadstone quarrying in the East Midlands.

=== Landscape ===
The landscape is characterized by a stark division between natural upland habitats and industrial quarry infrastructure. Bardon Hill includes ancient woodland and heathland designated as a Site of Special Scientific Interest (SSSI). Surrounding the hill peak, much of the parish consists of terraced quarry excavations, processing facilities, and large-scale logistics warehouses.

== History ==
The name originates from Old English, meaning 'tumulus hill'.

East of Bardon Hill is an oval moat about 12 metres (39 ft) wide and 1.5 metres (5 ft) deep. It encloses an area measuring about 65 metres (213 ft) by 75 metres (246 ft), creating an island raised roughly 1.5 metres (5 ft) above the surrounding land. The site is a scheduled monument located about 440 metres (1,440 ft) east of Kellam's Farm, just north of the asphalt carriage road linking Copt Oak and Bardon Hall.

A second, square or rectangular moat lies south of Bardon Hill. The moat island was the site of Old Bardon Hall, which was demolished in about 1840 following the completion of the present Bardon Hall higher up Bardon Hill.

Granite extraction at Bardon Hill dates to at least 1622. In 1832, the Leicester and Swannington Railway opened adjacent to the former village. An industrial siding was built into the quarry and remains in active freight use on the Leicester to Burton upon Trent Line. Bardon Hill railway station formerly served the area before its closure in the mid-20th century.

In 1921, Bardon recorded a population of 511 and contained a public house, the Birch Tree. During the late 20th century, the original village housing was demolished to allow quarry operations to expand.

== Governance ==
At the lowest level of local government, Bardon has no parish council; due to its small population, it functions as a parish meeting.

District services are administered by North West Leicestershire District Council, within which the parish forms part of the larger Bardon electoral ward. County-level local government functions are provided by Leicestershire County Council. For representation in the UK Parliament, Bardon forms part of the North West Leicestershire constituency.

== Economy ==
The economy of Bardon is centered on heavy extraction, building materials production, and distribution services.

- Bardon Hill Quarry: The parish's primary economic feature is Bardon Hill Quarry, operated by heavy building materials supplier Aggregate Industries. The quarry extracts high-strength volcanic stone for aggregate and road construction, supplying projects across the United Kingdom via rail freight connections on the Leicester to Burton upon Trent Line. Aggregate Industries also maintains its corporate headquarters at Bardon Hall.
- Logistics and Distribution: Capitalizing on proximity to the M1 motorway via the A511 road, Bardon hosts major warehousing and industrial developments, including the Bardon Hill Industrial Estate and Interlink Park. These parks accommodate regional distribution operations for several national logistics and retail corporations.
- Hospitality and Retail: Commercial amenities serving the area include the Birch Tree public house and restaurant on Bardon Road, alongside convenience and dining services aligned with nearby transport hubs and trade parks.

== Landmarks ==
=== Bardon Hall ===
Bardon Hall is a Tudor Revival country house built between 1830 and 1837. Designed by architect Robert Lugar for Robert Jacomb Hood, it replaced the moated Old Hall which had been held by the Hood family since the 1620s. The building stands just across the parish boundary in the unparished Coalville area.

In 1864, the estate was purchased by William Percy Herrick of Beaumanor Hall, who built a 2 miles (3 km) private carriage road connecting to the Ashby de la Zouch road. The hall is a Grade II listed building and serves as the corporate headquarters for building materials firm Aggregate Industries.

=== Moated site east of Kellam's Farm ===
Located approximately 440 metres (1,440 ft) east of Kellam's Farm, this scheduled monument consists of an oval moat about 12 metres (39 ft) wide and 1.5 metres (5 ft) deep surrounding an island raised above the adjacent land. It represents an exceptionally well-preserved medieval earthwork site within the parish.

=== Listed buildings ===
The area contains six Grade II listed buildings designated by Historic England for their architectural and historic interest:

- Bardon Hall – A Tudor Revival country house built c. 1830–1837 on Bardon Hill.
- Lodge to Bardon Hall – An entrance lodge located on Bardon Road serving the Bardon Hall estate.
- Bardon Park Chapel – A 17th-century nonconformist chapel situated on Shaw Lane.
- Kellam's Farmhouse and Attached Farm Office Range – A historic farmhouse and associated agricultural office range off Bardon Hill.
- Church of St Peter – A granite church built in 1899 on Bardon Road, located just outside the civil parish boundary within the unparished area of Coalville.
- Bardon Hill War Memorial – A historic war memorial structure located on Bardon Hill.

== Education ==
Bardon historically accommodated three school structures. Prior to the Elementary Education Act 1870, a Nonconformist "British School" operated behind Bardon Park Chapel. A day school was subsequently built alongside quarry workers' cottages near the quarry. When that building was cleared alongside the village, the school moved to a new building nearby. The second school building survives and is used as laboratory facilities and office space by Aggregate Industries.

== Religious sites ==
=== St Peter's Church ===
St Peter's Church was designed by J.B. Everard (1844–1923) and built in 1899. It was erected in memory of two co-owners of the quarry from the Everard family. Built of uncoursed local granite, the church structure stands roughly 330 yards (300 m) outside the Bardon parish boundary, within the adjacent unparished Coalville area.

=== Bardon Park Chapel ===
Bardon Park Chapel is a 17th-century nonconformist chapel located in the southern part of the parish near the A511 road. Built around 1694 and altered in 1830, 1877, and 1900, original 17th-century features include roof trusses and an octagonal wooden pulpit with fluted Doric pilasters. The chapel is affiliated with the United Reformed Church.

== See also ==
- Bardon Hill
- Bardon Hill Quarry
- Bardon Hill railway station

== Sources and further reading ==
- Brodie, Antonia; Felstead, Alison; Franklin, Jonathan; Pinfield, Leslie, eds. (2001). Directory of British Architects 1834–1914. Vol. A–K. London & New York: Continuum. p. 735. ISBN 0-8264-5513-1.
- Hartley, R.F. (1984). The Medieval Earthworks of North West Leicestershire. pp. 8–9.
- Noble, Len (1995). Bardon Hill – a source book being a collection of papers, anecdotes and published work concerning the ancient enclosure of Bardon Park, with additional comment. self-published. ISBN 0-9525978-0-2.
- Nuttall, G. Clarke (1907). A Guide to Leicester and District. Leicester: Edward Shardlow. p. 188.
- Pevsner, Nikolaus (1960). Leicestershire and Rutland. The Buildings of England. Harmondsworth: Penguin Books. p. 57.
