= Samuel Perkins Pick =

- Born: 1858; Kettering, Northamptonshire, England
- Died: 23 May 1919 (aged c.61); Leicester, England.
- Occupation: Architect

Samuel Perkins Pick (1858 – 23 May 1919) was an English architect strongly associated with Leicestershire, and co-founder of the architecture and civil engineering firm Pick Everard.

== Early career ==
The son of a veterinary surgeon, Pick was born in Kettering and educated at Kibworth Grammar School, where he was introduced to two artists (Harry Ward and John Fulleylove) who encouraged him to produce drawings of buildings, some of which were published in The Builder.

In 1884, when he was awarded a medal by the Worshipful Company of Plaisterers, he was described as an architectural apprentice of John Breedon Everard of Leicester and assistant teacher at the Leicester School of Art. In 1888 he entered into partnership with Everard. In 1911, the partnership was expanded to include William Keay, forming the partnership of Pick, Everard and Keay, with premises at 6 Millstone Lane, Leicester.

== Major work ==
His works included:

- the County Mental Hospital (later known as Carlton Hayes Hospital) at Narborough (1904–07)
- extensions to the Leicester Royal Infirmary, the Leicestershire and Rutland Lunatic Asylum (now the Fielding Johnson Building of the University of Leicester), the Borough Mental Hospital (The Towers Hospital), and Leicester's technical and art schools (now the Hawthorn Building of De Montfort University).
- the Midlands Agricultural and Dairy College (1895; today the University of Nottingham's Sutton Bonington Campus) at Kingston on Soar, Nottinghamshire
- extensions to the Royal Hampshire County Hospital, Winchester
- major extensions to Addenbrooke's Hospital, Cambridge, and the Coppice Mental Hospital, Nottingham.
- St Michael and All Angels Church, Leicester (1897–98)
- the Parr's Bank building in St. Martin's, Leicester (1900 - later National Westminster Bank)
- St Phillip's Church, Leicester (1909–13)
- houses in Victoria Park Road, Leicester
- the façade of the Marquis Wellington pub, 139 London Road, Leicester

He twice served as president of the Leicester Society of Architects, was elected a fellow and vice-president of the Royal Institute of British Architects, a fellow of the Society of Antiquaries, and a member of the Society for the Protection of Ancient Buildings.
