= Myrtle the Parachick =

Chicken that was officially recognized as a World War II paratrooper

Myrtle the Parachick was a chicken that was officially recognized as an Allied paratrooper during World War II.

== Military career ==
Over the summer of 1944, Lt. Pat Glover and some of his fellow soldiers of the British 1st Airborne Division had a short debate among themselves over whether or not chickens could fly. Glover took it upon himself to prove that they could, obtained a chicken which he named Myrtle, and began to bring her along during his paratrooper training jumps in a haversack. On the first jump, he released Myrtle at a height of 50 feet and she performed a safe, though chaotic, landing. Eventually, Glover found he was able to safely release Myrtle from heights of up to 300 feet.

After her sixth training jump alongside Glover, it was determined that Myrtle had completed the required number of deployments to be recognized as a qualified military parachutist by the British Armed Forces, and she was awarded her United Kingdom Parachutist Badge, which Glover fastened around her neck.

In September 1944, the Allied Operation Market Garden, a mission to seize several bridge crossings of the Rhine river into Nazi Germany via paratrooper attacks, assigned Glover's brigade to the bridge deepest in German-held territory at the city of Arnhem. Despite Myrtle's successes during training, Glover decided that under the threat of real combat, it would be best to keep Myrtle in her bag until he made it to the ground. Upon landing, Glover handed Myrtle off to his batman, and focused his efforts on the battle, which had turned out fiercer than expected.

Myrtle was among those killed in action during the ensuing Battle of Arnhem. Despite the unprecedented fury of the battle, Glover and his men gave her a military burial before Allied forces eventually retreated from the Arnhem area.

== Legacy ==
In 1994, a plush chicken representing Myrtle was brought along to the 50th annual commemoration ceremony of the Battle of Arnhem. Lt. Glover was also in attendance, though he did not participate in the reenactment parachute drop. Responsibility for carrying the stuffed Myrtle replica during the drop was given to Pte. Les Locket.

From 2017 to 2018, the Everards brewing company in the UK produced a specialty beer named after Myrtle. The beer was available in 178 pubs in the Leicestershire area, where the 1st Airborne Division was stationed during Myrtle's training.
