= Back Tor =

Back Tor may refer to:

- Back Tor (near Mam Tor), near Mam Tor in the High Peak of Derbyshire, England
- Back Tor (Derwent Edge), at Derwent Edge, in the Peak District National Park, Derbyshire, England
