= Pick Everard =

UK construction consultancy

- Formerly: Pick Everard, Keay and Gimson
- Company type: Subsidiary of Artelia
- Industry: Construction, Consultancy, Real Estate
- Founded: 1866
- Founders: John Breedon Everard and Samuel Perkins Pick
- Headquarters: Leicester, United Kingdom
- Number of locations: 13
- Area served: United Kingdom of Great Britain & Northern Ireland
- Key people: Duncan Green, CEO
- Number of employees: 700
- Website: www.pickeverard.co.uk

Pick Everard is a UK-based multi-disciplinary consultancy, operating primarily in the built environment. The company was founded in Leicester in 1866 as an engineering and architectural practice. It grew to become a national practice with over 700 employees and 13 UK offices including a head office in Leicester and offices in Glasgow, London, Cardiff and Manchester. It is a subsidiary of Artelia.

== History ==
Pick Everard was founded by John Breedon Everard, a civil engineer in 1866 at 6 Millstone Lane, Leicester. Samuel Perkins Pick, an architect joined John Breedon Everard as his assistant in 1882 and as a partner in 1888.

John Breedon Everard was the son of Breedon Everard, the joint founder of the quarrying and mining business Ellis and Everard Ltd (later Aggregate Industries). He was the nephew of the brewer William Everard and in 1875 he designed a new tower brewery for Everards Brewery at Southgate St, Leicester.

At the beginning of the 20th century, Bernard Everard (son of John Breedon Everard) became a partner of the firm, which changed its name to Everard, Son and Pick. William Keay, a civil engineer who worked for Everard, Son and Pick became a partner circa 1920 and in 1925, Martin Gimson, a civil engineer became the fourth partner, changing the firm's name to Pick, Everard, Keay and Gimson. The company today is called Pick Everard.

In October 2024, 700-strong Pick Everard was acquired by Artelia, a French project management and cost consultant. Artelia had previously acquired Birmingham-based Austin Newport Group in 2020, and Suffolk-based Castons in March 2024. With Pick Everard, Artelia now had almost 1,000 UK staff, and 9,700 staff worldwide.

== Services ==
The company's services include: advisory services; architecture; BIM consultancy; building surveying; building services engineering; civil engineering; cost consultancy and quantity surveying; environmental consultancy; facilities management consultancy; health and safety consultancy; interior design; landscape architecture; project management; structural engineering; sustainability and energy consultancy; and water engineering (including hydraulic modelling).

== Office locations ==
The company has offices in Birmingham, Bristol, Bury St Edmunds, Cardiff, Derby, Glasgow, Inverness, Leeds, Leicester, London, Manchester, Nottingham and Sheffield.

== Awards and recognition ==
- RICS Social Impact Awards: Education Award 2020 East
- Association of Consulting Engineers (ACE) Awards: Best UK Business Performance (Large Organisation) Award 2019
- Celebrating Construction Awards: Integration and Collaborative Working Award 2019 and Value Award 2019
- NEC Awards: Client of the Year – Highly Commended 2019
- SPACES Awards: Young Visionary Awards – Highly Commended x 2 2019
