= St Peter's Church, Bardon =

Church in Bardon, Leicestershire

Coordinates: 52°42′32″N 1°20′09″W

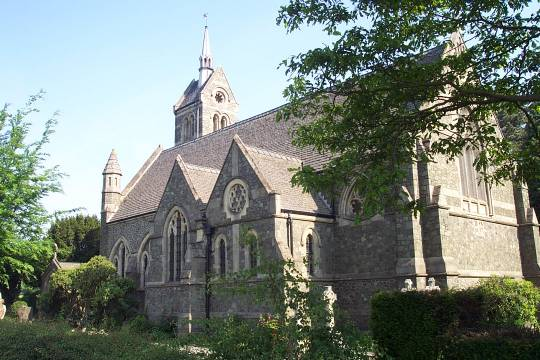
- Denomination: Church of England

History
- Dedication: St Peter

Administration
- Diocese: Leicester
- Archdeaconry: Loughborough
- Parish: Bardon, Leicestershire

Clergy
- Rector: Gill & Geoff Pinnington

St Peter's Church is a church in Bardon, Leicestershire. It is a Grade II listed building.

== History ==
The church was designed by John Breedon Everard (1844–1923), who is buried in the churchyard, and was built in 1899, in memory of the Everard family. It is built of granite and its exterior masonry is laid like crazy paving.

The tower has three bells cast in 1899 by John Taylor & Co of Loughborough. The tower's saddleback roof is topped off by a flèche.

== Sources ==
- Brodie, Antonia; Felstead, Alison; Franklin, Jonathan; Pinfield, Leslie; Oldfield, Jane, eds. (2001). Directory of British Architects 1834-1914, A-K. London & New York: Continuum. ISBN 0-8264-5513-1.
- Pevsner, Nikolaus (1960). Leicestershire and Rutland. The Buildings of England. Harmondsworth: Penguin Books.
