= Fielding Johnson Building =

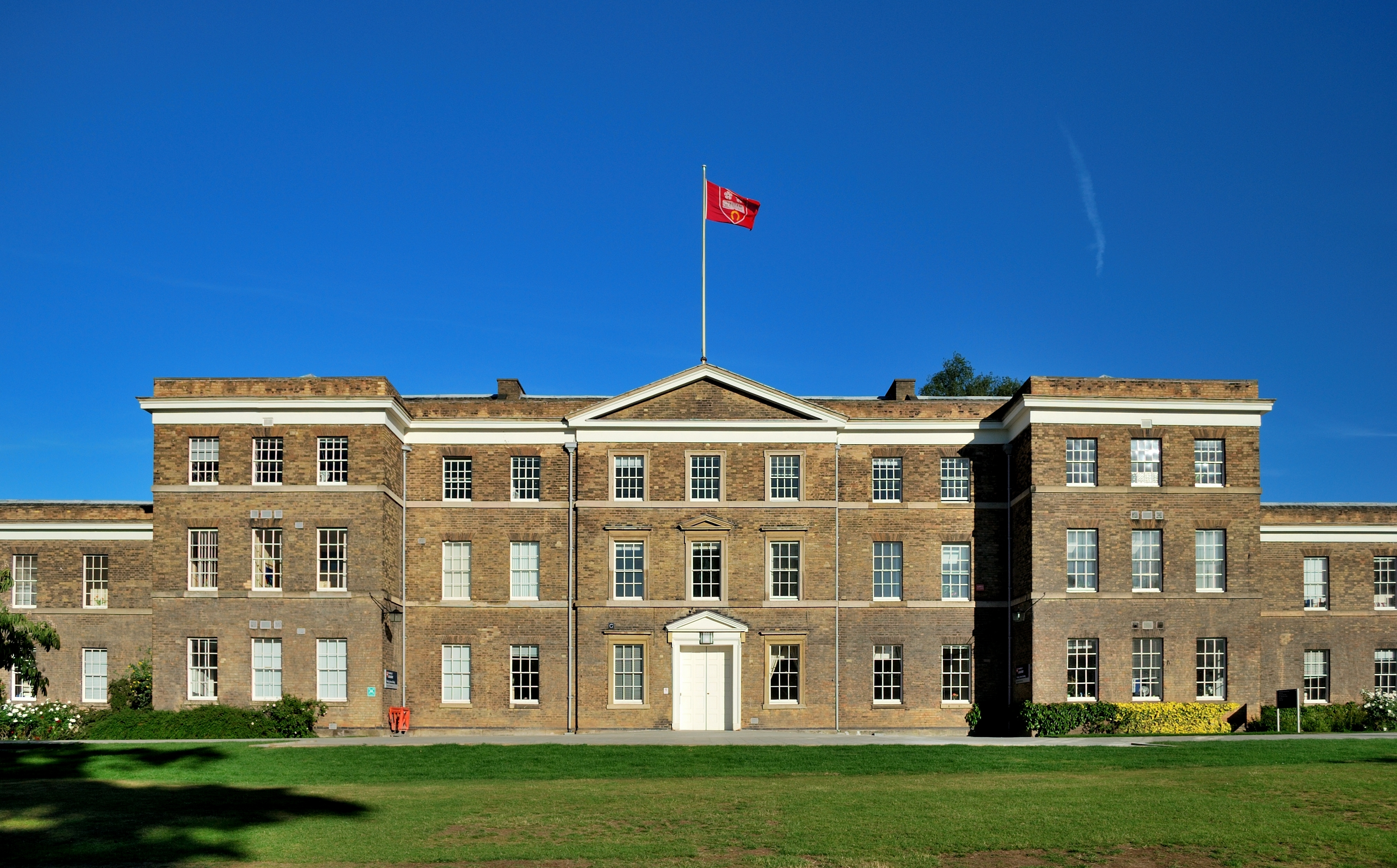
- Fielding Johnson Building

- Shown in Leicestershire

Geography
- Location: Leicester, Leicestershire, England
- Coordinates: 52.6204°N 1.1278°W

Organisation
- Care system: NHS
- Type: Specialist

Services
- Emergency department: N/A
- Speciality: Psychiatric Hospital

History
- Founded: 1837

Links
- Lists: Hospitals in England

The Fielding Johnson Building is the main administrative building for the University of Leicester, Leicester, England. It is a Grade II listed building.

== History ==
The building, which was designed by William Parsons with assistance from George Wallett in the late Georgian provincial style using an early Corridor Plan layout, opened as the Leicestershire and Rutland County Asylum in May 1837. There were 104 original inmates when the asylum first opened. Both wings were extended behind the main block in 1842. After the last inmates transferred to the new Carlton Hayes Hospital, the Leicester and Rutland Asylum closed in September 1908. During the First World War, the building was requisitioned by the War Office to create the 5th Northern General Hospital, a facility for the Royal Army Medical Corps to treat military casualties.

In 1921 the building was acquired by Thomas Fielding Johnson, a local businessman, who gifted it to Leicestershire and Rutland University College on its foundation. The building was home to most of the university departments until purpose-built accommodation was created. It was renamed the Fielding Johnson Building in 1964 and has since become the main administration building of the University of Leicester.

The building now houses the faculty of law and the faculty of criminology.
