= Hawaiian quilt =

Quilting style of the Hawaiian Islands

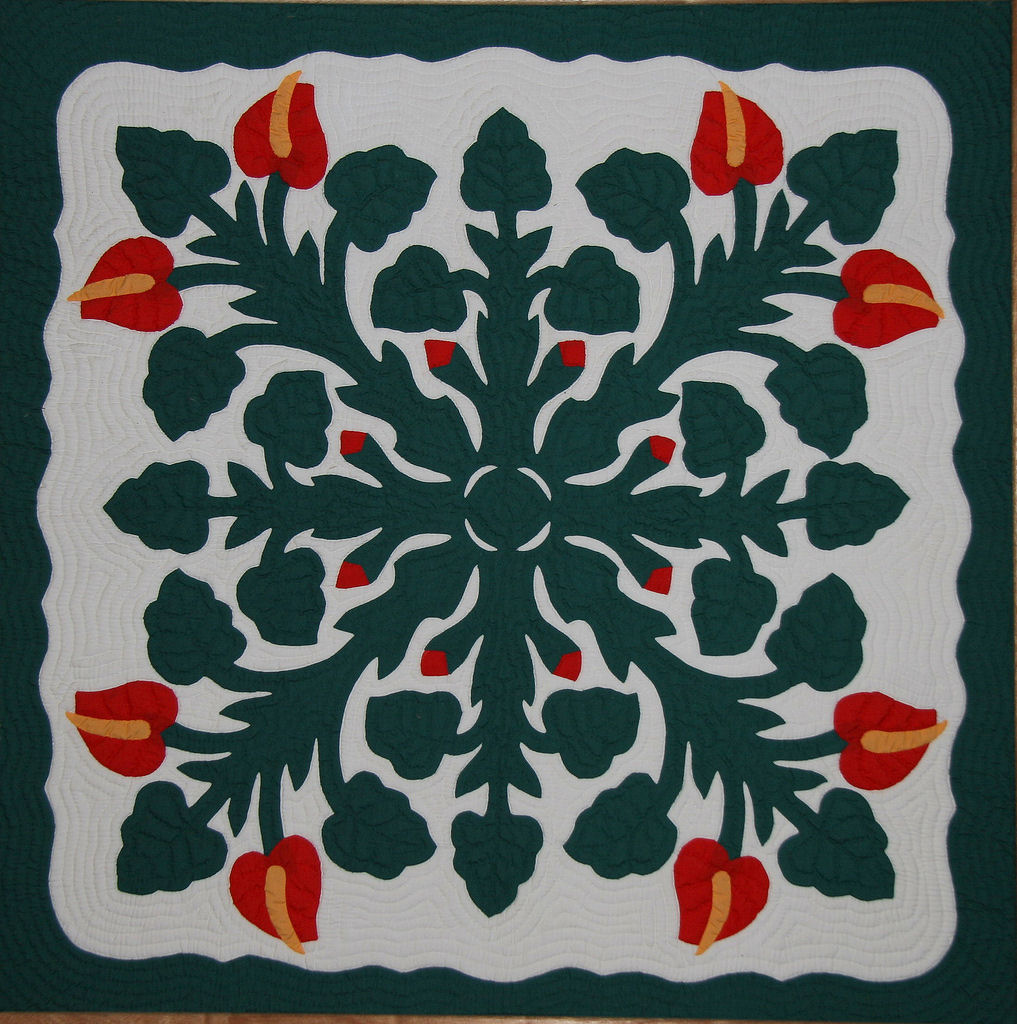
A Hawaiian quilt.

A Hawaiian quilt is a distinctive quilting style of the Hawaiian Islands that uses large radially symmetric applique patterns. Motifs often work stylized botanical designs in bold colors on a white background.

Hawaiian quilt appliqué is made from a single cut on folded fabric. Quilting stitches normally follows the contours of the appliqué design.

== History ==
Hawaiian quilting derives from the kapa moe, an indigenous bed cover textile. Kapa was constructed from the inner bark of local trees. Traditional kapa was beaten and felted, then dyed in geometric patterns.

Quilting may have begun in the Hawaiian islands with the arrival of missionaries and Western fabrics in the 1820s. The climate of Hawaii is unsuitable for cotton cultivation and kapa is unsuitable for quilting so all Hawaiian quilts are constructed from imported material. The earliest written reference comes from Isabella Bird who visited Hawaii in 1870 and wrote a travelogue Six Months in the Sandwich Islands.

== Flag quilts ==
Another Hawaiian quilt style is the Hawaiian flag quilt, also known as Ku’u Hae Aloha ("My Beloved Flag" or "Lost Beloved Flag") quilts. The typical flag quilt includes four Hawaiian flags surrounding the coat of arms of the Hawaiian Royal Family or crown. Flag quilts combine pieced work with appliquéd motifs, unlike other traditional Hawaiian quilts, which do not use pieced work.

Flag quilts may have originated as early as 1843, when Lord George Paulet claimed the Hawaiian Islands for the British and ordered all Hawaiian flags destroyed. Many of these flag quilts date back to the overthrow of the monarchy, when displaying the Hawaiian flag was considered treason. Quilts bearing symbols of the monarchy were a form of silent resistance.

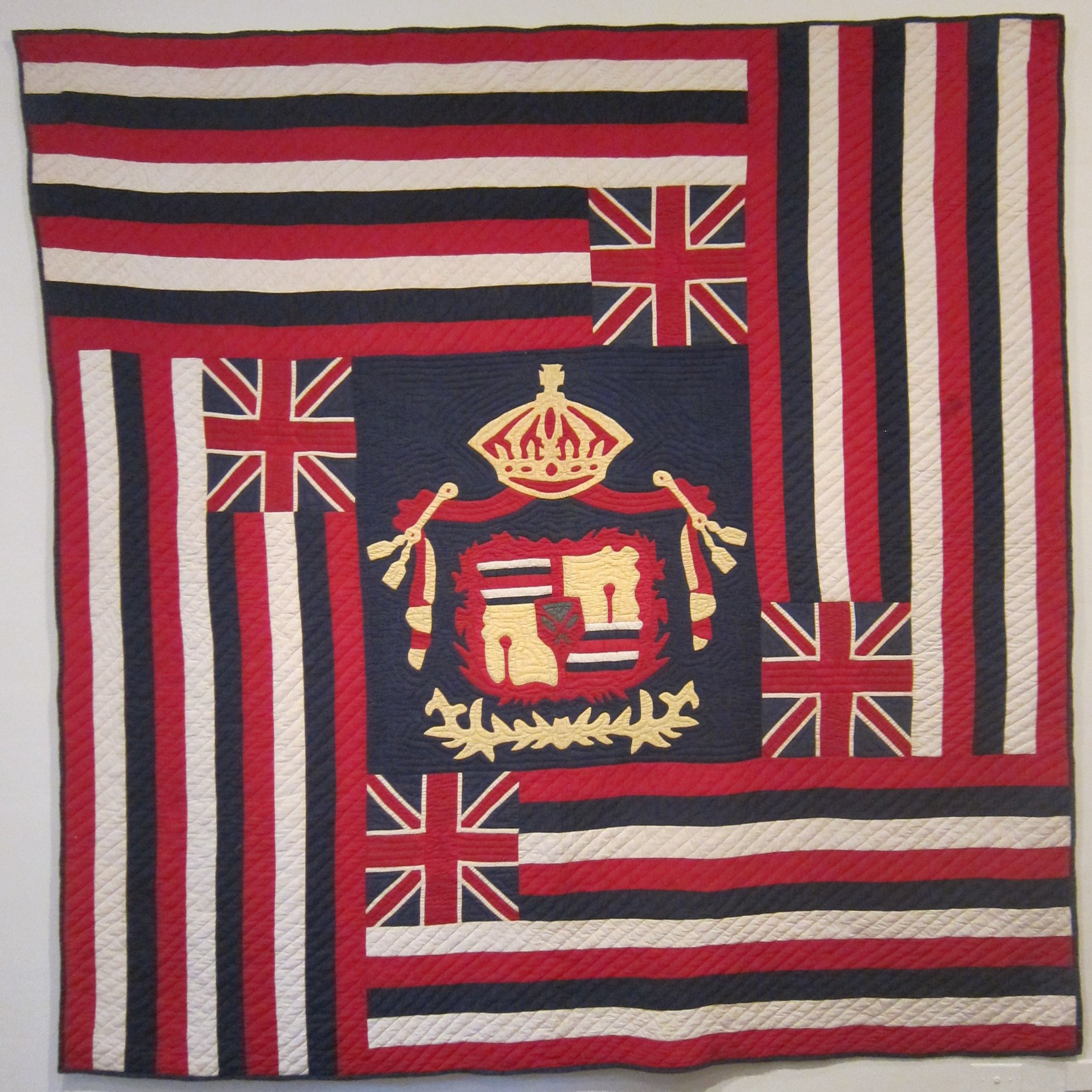
Kuʻu Hae Aloha (My Beloved Flag), Hawaiian cotton quilt from Waimea, before 1918, Honolulu Museum of Art

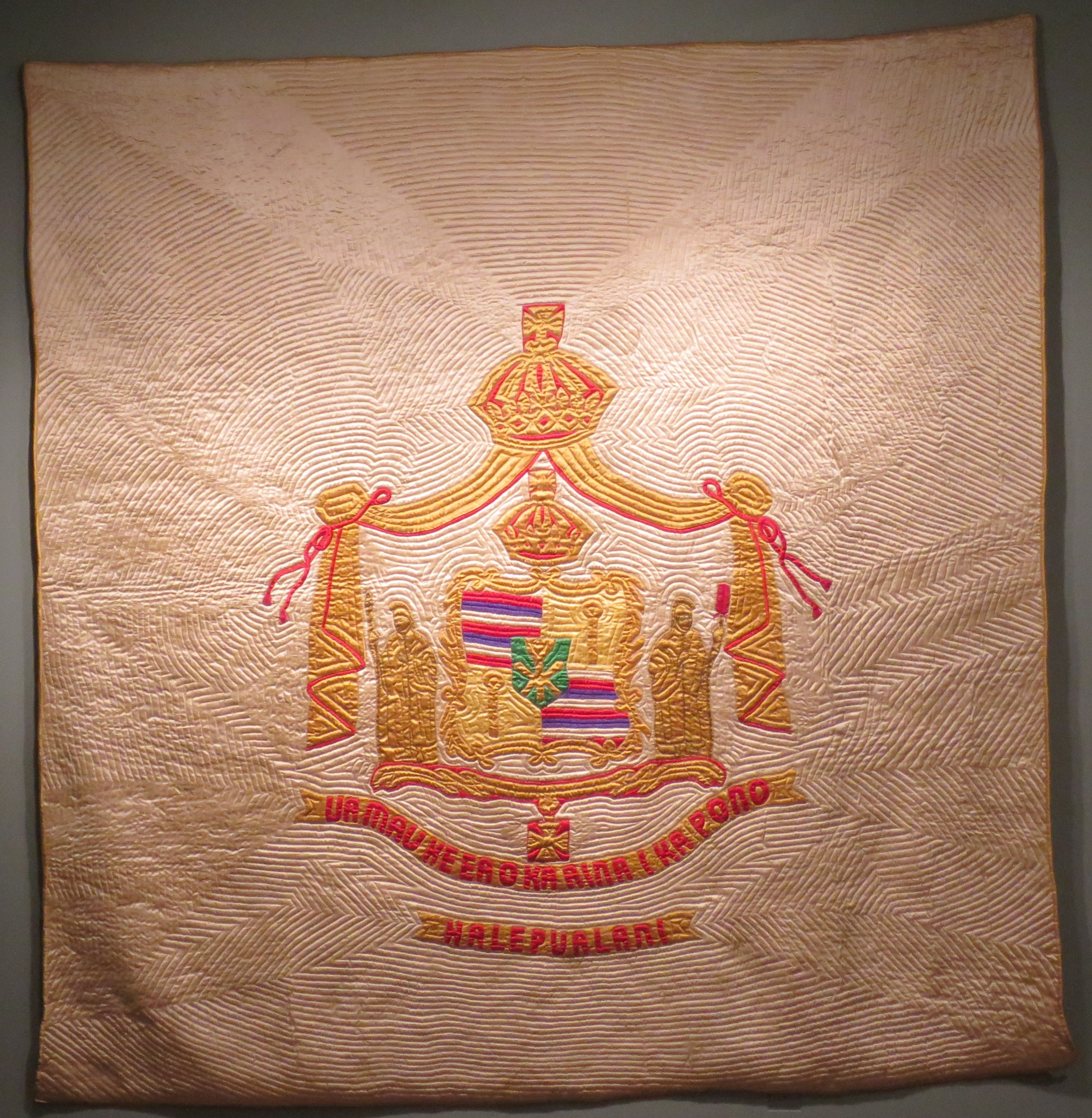
Ua Mau Ke Ea O Ka Aina I ka Pono-Halepualani, Hawaiian quilt, silk satin, wool batting, cotton, Honolulu Museum of Art

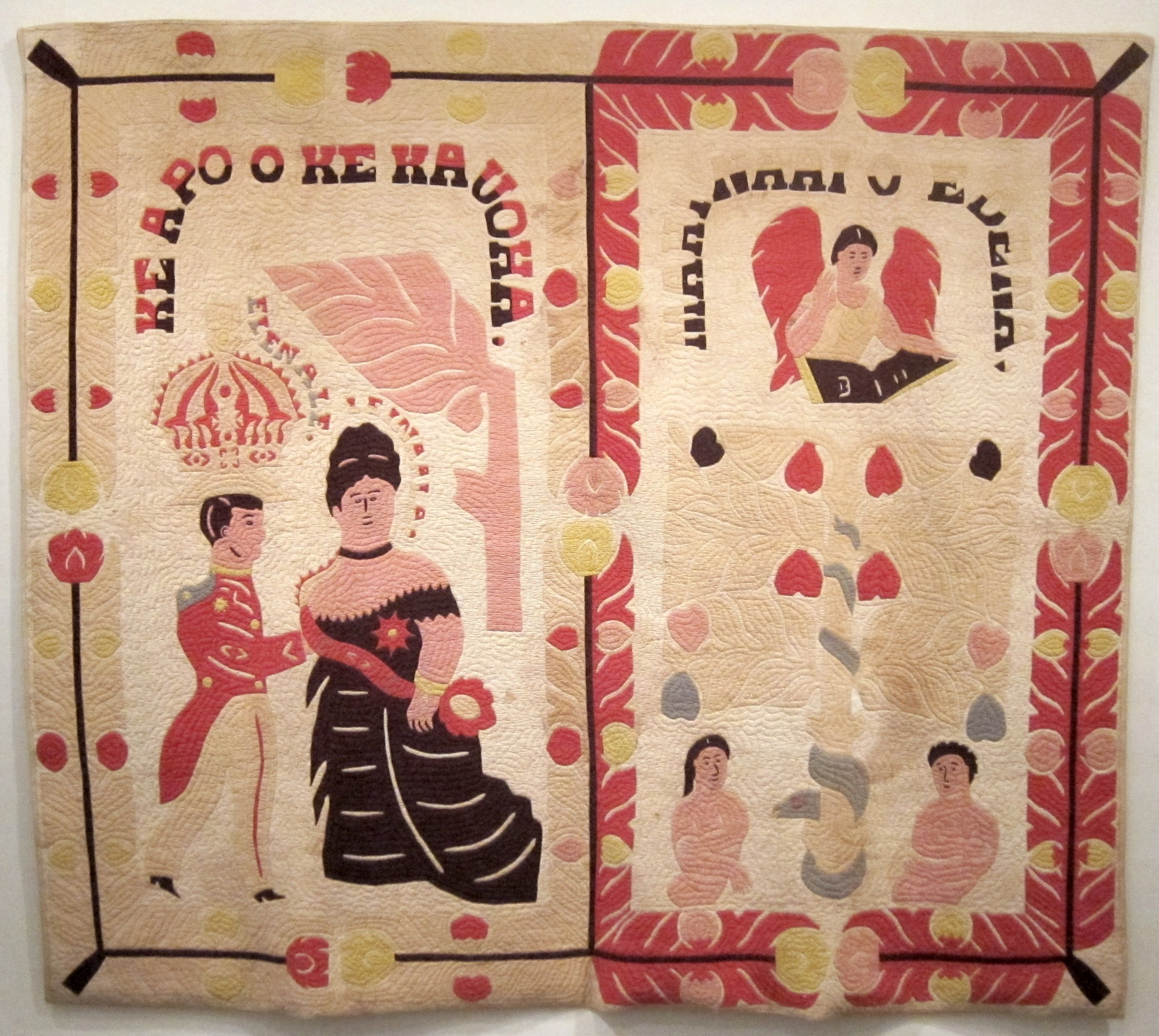
Na Kihapai Nani Lua ʻOle O Edena a Me Elenale (The Beautiful Unequaled Gardens of Eden and of Elenale), Hawaiian cotton quilt, before 1918, Honolulu Museum of Art

== Other styles ==
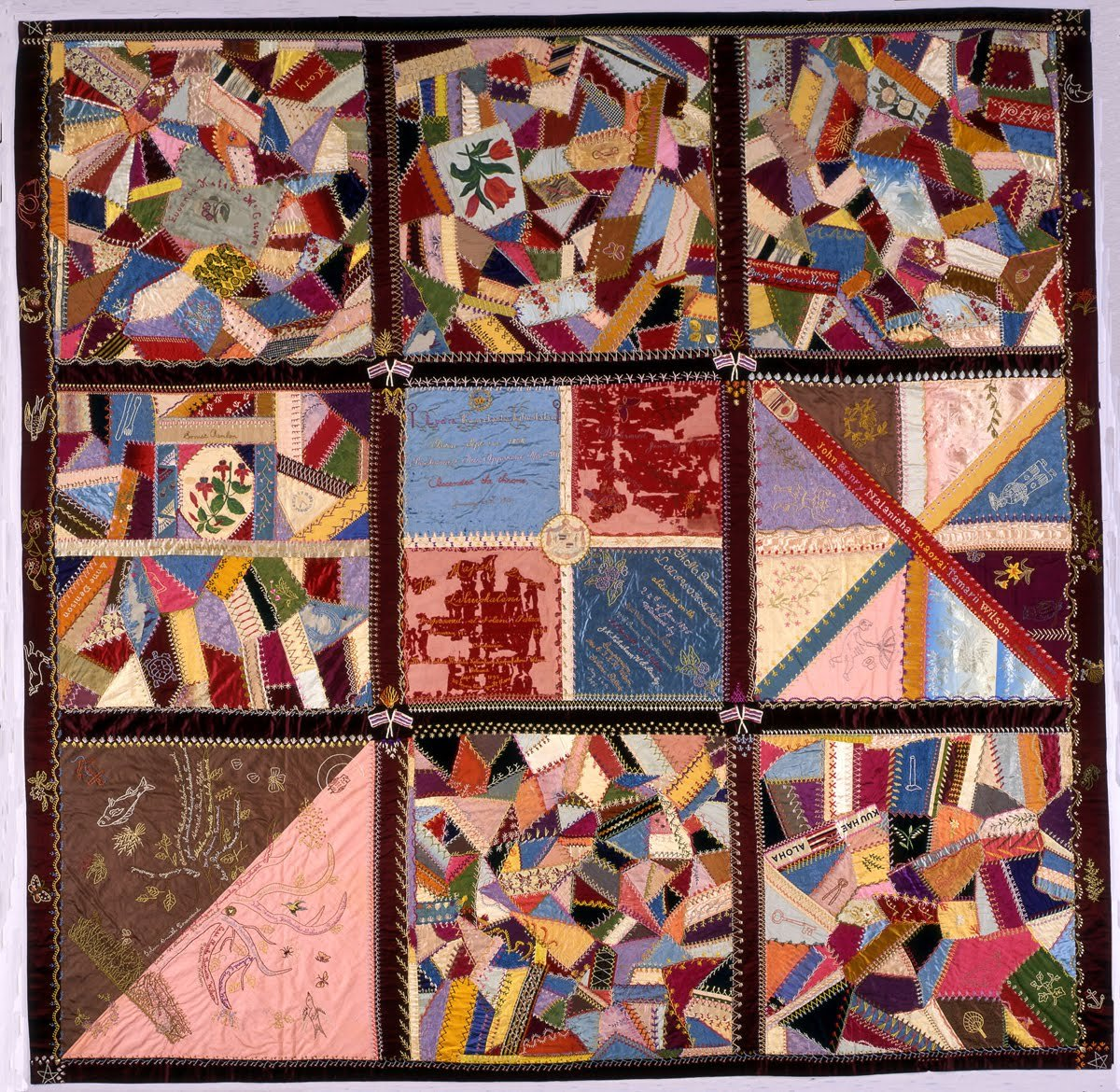
Queen Liliuokalani Quilt, ʻIolani Palace

Hawaiian quilters have also made quilts using other styles and techniques, such as embroidery and crazy quilting. The most famous Hawaiian crazy quilt is the one made by Queen Liliuokalani during her internment after the overthrow of the monarchy.

== Value ==
Antique Hawaiian flag quilts fetch higher prices than applique quilts: high quality flag quilts may be valued at $40,000 - $60,000 while applique quilts sell for $9000 – $15,000. Factors that affect price include the quality of the original construction, preservation of the item's color and physical integrity, and provenance.

== See also ==
- Hawaiian art
