= Crazy quilting =

Textile art form

Crazy quilt by Granny Irwin, Museum of Appalachia, Norris, Tennessee

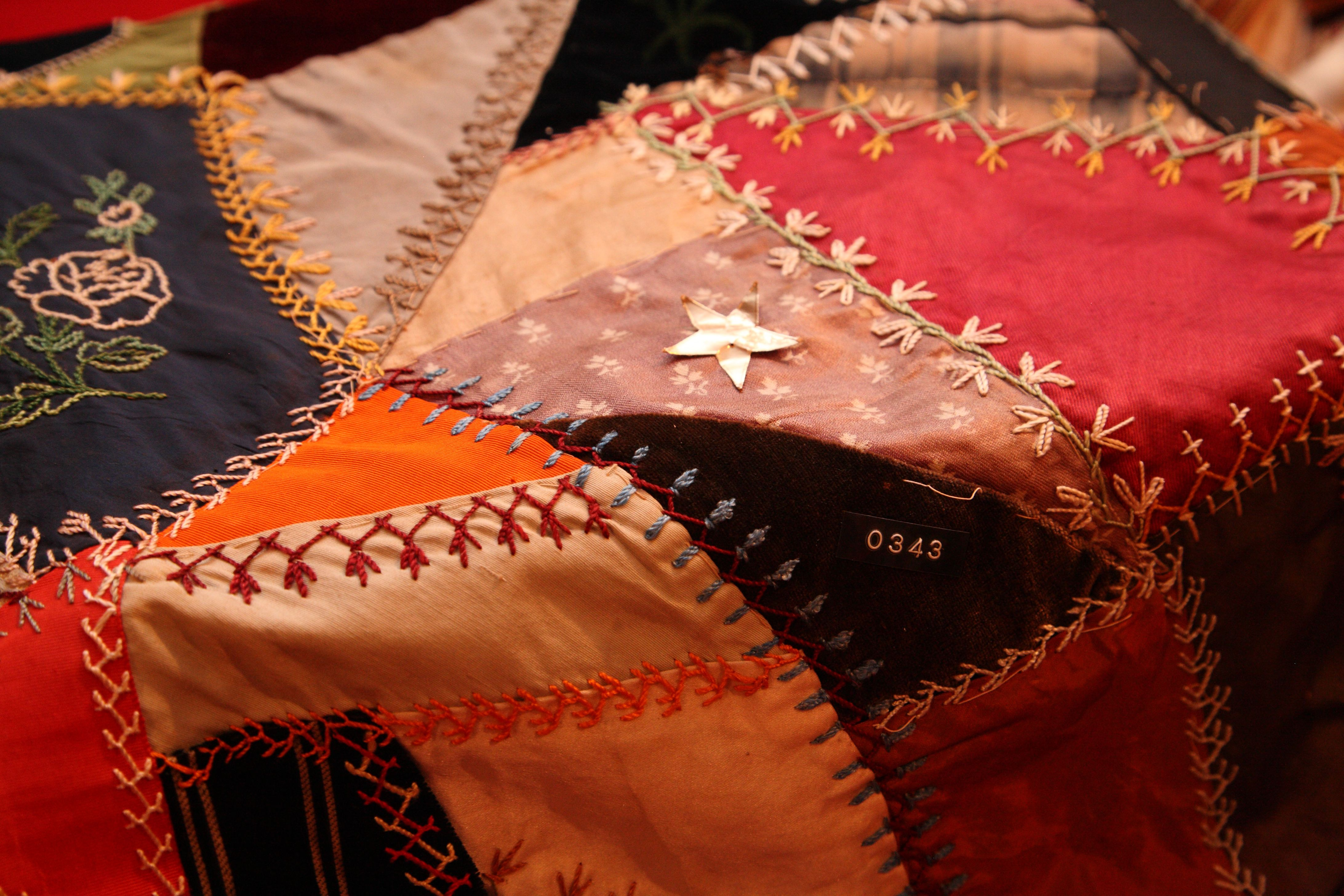
Closeup showing floral embroidery

The term "crazy quilting" is often used to refer to the textile art of crazy patchwork and is sometimes used interchangeably with that term. Crazy quilting does not actually refer to a specific kind of quilting (the needlework which binds two or more layers of fabric together), but a specific kind of patchwork lacking repeating motifs and with the seams and patches heavily embellished. A crazy quilt rarely has the internal layer of batting that is part of what defines quilting as a textile technique.

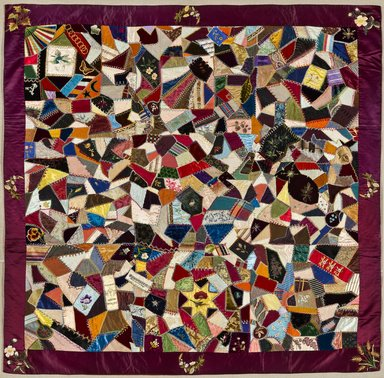
Rebecca Palmer. Crazy Quilt, 1884. Silk, velvet. Brooklyn Museum

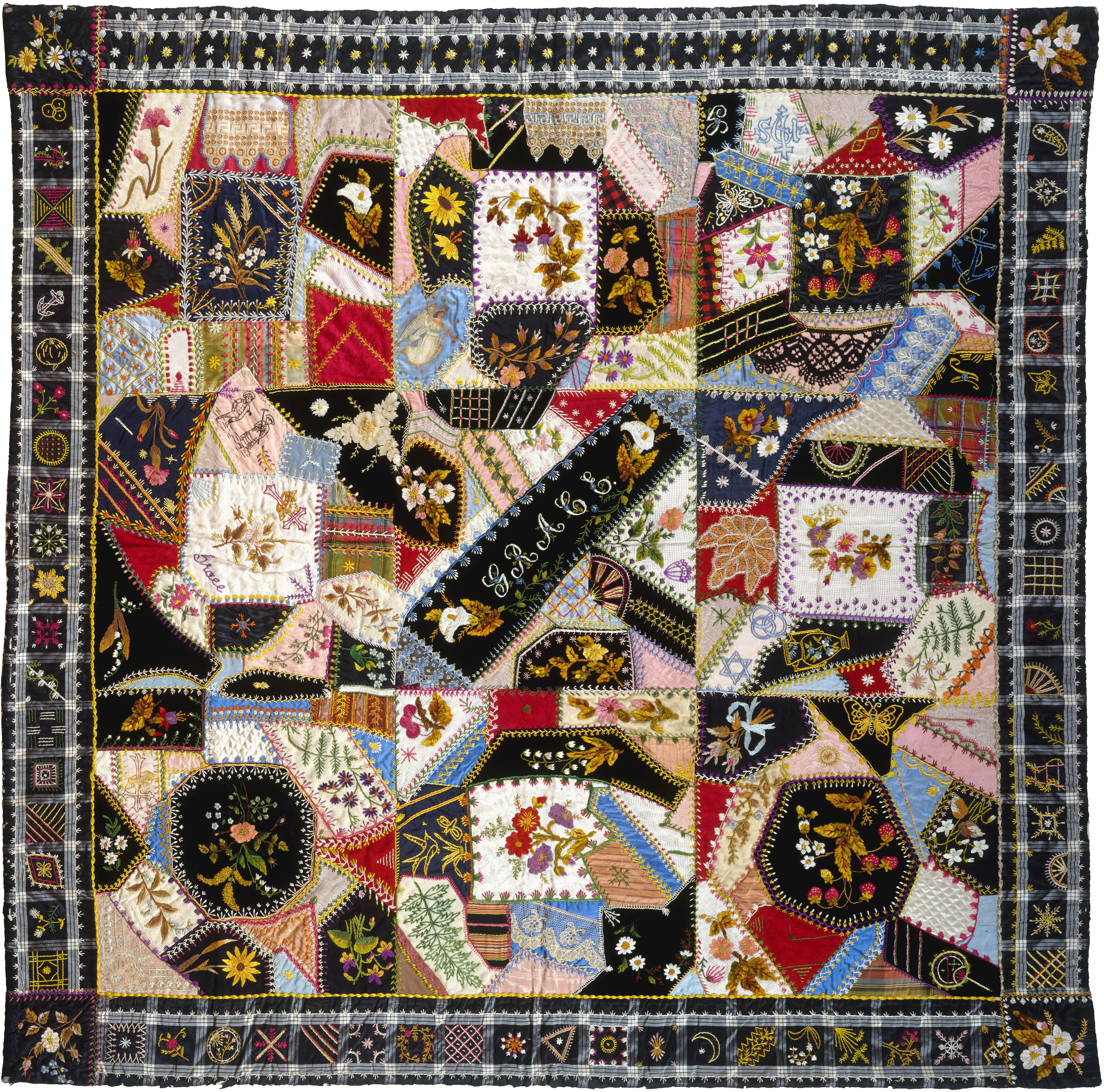
Tamar Horton Harris North. “Quilt (or decorative throw), Crazy pattern”. ~1877. 54 1/2 × 55 in. Metropolitan Museum of Art.

== Embellishing ==
Crazy quilts differ from “regular” quilts in other ways as well. Because the careful geometric design of a quilt block is much less important in crazy quilts, the quilters are able to employ much smaller and more irregularly shaped pieces of fabric. In comparison to standard quilts, crazy quilts are far more likely to use exotic pieces of fabric, such as velvet, satin, tulle, or silk, and embellishments such as buttons, lace, ribbons, beads, or embroidery.

Crazy quilts range from carefree and relatively easy, to extremely labor-intensive. A Harper's Bazaar article from 1884 estimated that a full-size crazy quilt could take 1,500 hours to complete.

== History ==
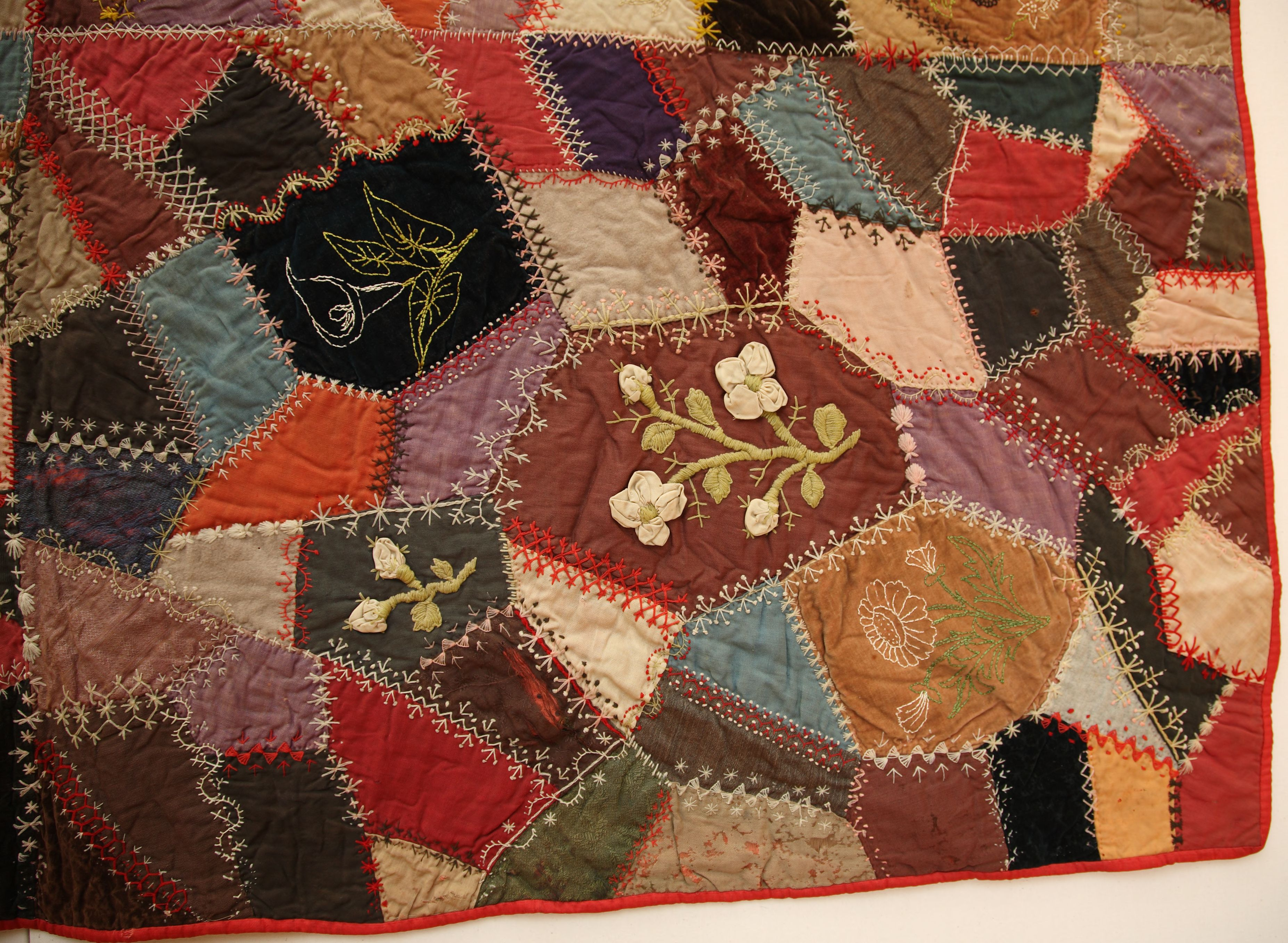
Detail on a crazy quilt

Crazy quilts became popular in the late 1800s, likely due to the English embroidery and Japanese art that was displayed at the Philadelphia Centennial Exposition. American audiences were drawn to the satin stitches used in English embroidery, which created a painterly surface, which is reflected in many crazy quilts. The displays shown at the Japanese pavilion of silk-screened work and Japanese pottery with a cracked-glaze inspired the American audiences. Similar aesthetics began to show up in crazy quilts, including unique patterns, and stitching that resembled spider webs and fans.

Crazy quilting rapidly became a national fashion amongst urban, upper-class women, who used the wide variety of fabrics that the newly industrialized 19th century textile industry offered to piece together single quilts from hundreds of different fabrics. Long after the style had fallen out of fashion amongst urban women, it continued in rural areas and small towns, whose quilters adopted the patterns of the urban quilts but employed sturdier, more practical fabrics, and dropped the earlier quilts' ornate embroidery and embellishment.

== See also ==
- Crazy paving
- Hawaiian quilt
- Quilt

== Sources ==
- Brick, Cindy (2008). Crazy Quilts: History, Techniques, Embroidery Motifs. Voyageur Press. ISBN 978-0-7603-3237-5.
- Dabbs, Christine (2000). Crazy Quilting: Heirloom Quilts: Traditional Motifs and Decorative Stitches. Rutledge Hill Press. ISBN 1-55853-694-9.
- Montano, Judith Baker (1995). Elegant Stitches: An Illustrated Stitch Guide and Source Book of Inspiration. C&T Publishing. ISBN 0-914881-85-X.
