= William Keay =

William Keay (1869-1952) was an English civil engineer and architect particularly associated with works in Leicestershire.

== Career ==
Born in Leicester, Keay began his career as a civil engineer working with Everard, Son and Pick from 1911, while also developing his own partnership and extending into architecture (a member of the Institution of Civil Engineers, he was also eventually elected a fellow of Royal Institution of British Architects).

In 1923 his practice merged with the Pick Everard practice, which was joined by Martin Gimson in 1925 to become Pick, Everard, Keay and Gimson (since 1991 known as Pick Everard). Keay was also county architect for Leicestershire County Council with an office in the medieval Castle House in the Leicester Castle Close. In this role, his projects included:

- extensions to Carlton Hayes Hospital (1930s)
- the County Offices on the corner of Friar Lane and Greyfriars, Leicester (1936)
- Hinckley police station (1937)
- Hinckley cottage hospital extensions (1936-9)
- St John's church, Coventry Road, Hinckley (1948)

Other works included:

- overall planning and early buildings of the Leicester University College campus, including Wyggeston boys and girls grammar schools (from 1921)
- Holy Apostles Church on Fosse Road South (1923-4)
- assistance to Sir Charles Nicholson on work at Leicester Cathedral (1927)
- St Christopher’s Church in Marriott Road, Leicester (1928 – now the Church Hall)
- an extension to Ernest Gimson’s “Inglewood” in Ratcliffe Road, Leicester (1930)

During the 1930s, he made a detailed record and carried out archaeological excavations on the site of Ulverscroft Priory in Charnwood Forest.

He lived for a time in Glenfield at a house called "The Gynsills" (now a pub), formerly owned by the Ellis family associated with the Bardon Hill quarrying business, Ellis and Everard.
