= Lost Lad =

Hill in the Peak District

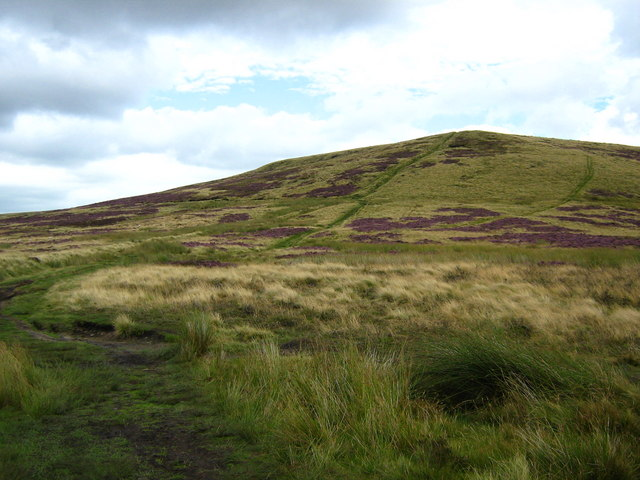
- Lost Lad

Highest point
- Elevation: 518 m (1,699 ft)
- Prominence: ca. 10 m
- Parent peak: Back Tor (Derwent Edge)
- Listing: none
- Coordinates: 53.4173°N 1.7108°W

Geography
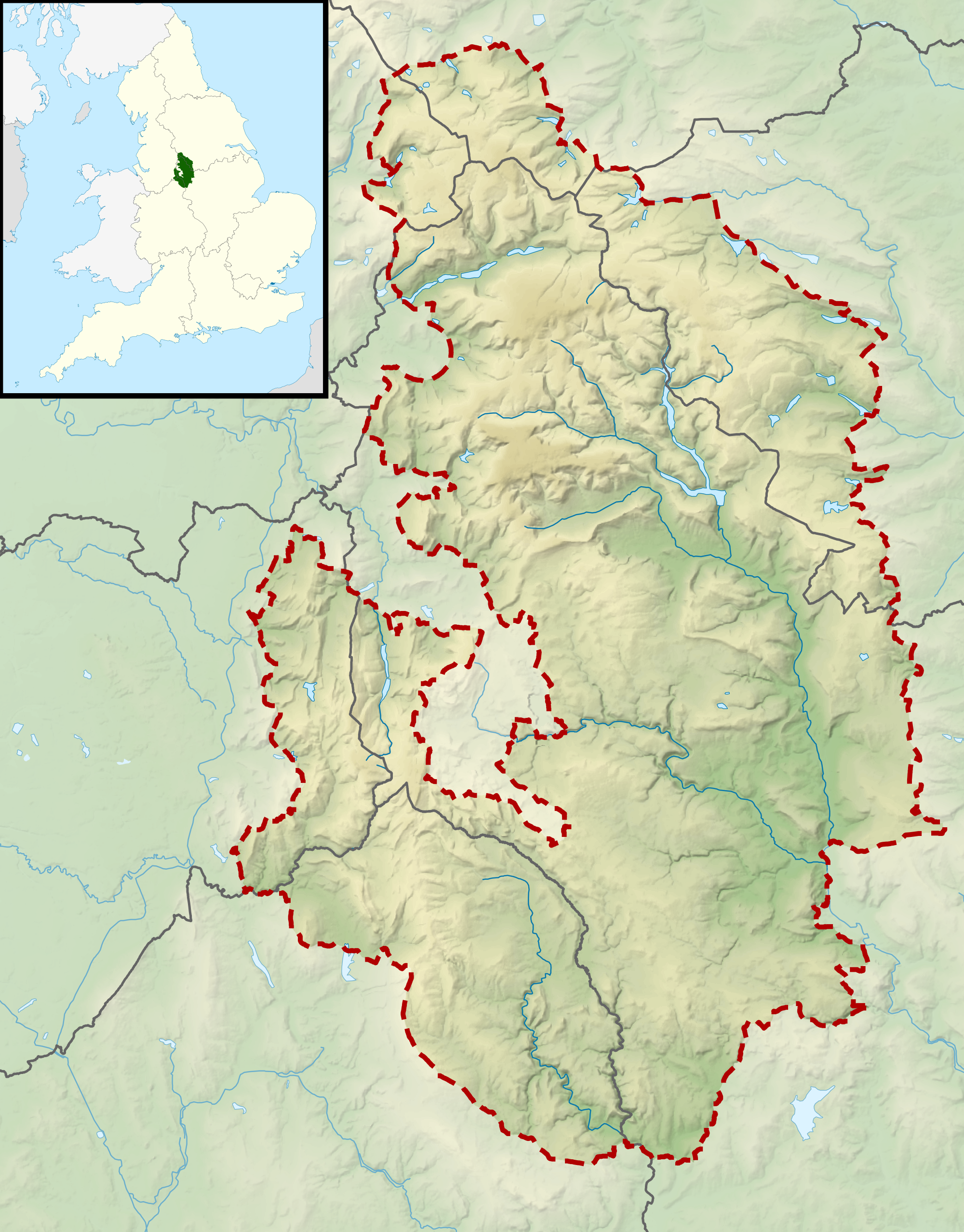
- Location within the Peak District Location within Derbyshire
- Location: Derbyshire, England
- Parent range: Peak District
- OS grid: SK193912
- Topo map: OS Landranger 110; OL1W

Lost Lad is a hill, 518 metres (1,699 ft) high on the Derwent Edge in the Peak District in the county of Derbyshire in England. It is a subpeak of Back Tor (538 metres [1,765 ft]).

== Description ==
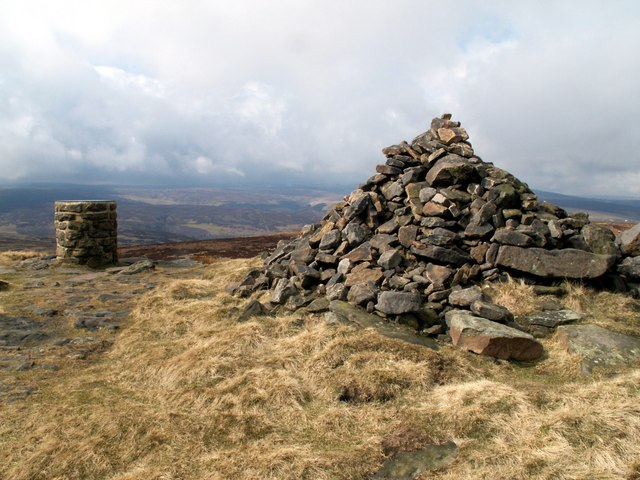
The top of Lost Lad

Lost Lad is a bare, conical moorland summit and subpeak of the nearby Back Tor which rises about 600 metres to the southeast. The top of Lost Lad is marked by a cairn and toposcope and there are good views over the surrounding northern Peak District.

== Name ==
Lost Lad is actually the name of the cairn at the top, whose name refers to a legend about a shepherd boy from the lost village of Derwent. According to the legend the boy became lost on the moors in a blizzard and died. His body was found the following spring by a passing shepherd and nearby were the words "Lost Lad" written on a rock.
