= Carlton Hayes Hospital =

Coordinates: 52.58°N 1.21°W

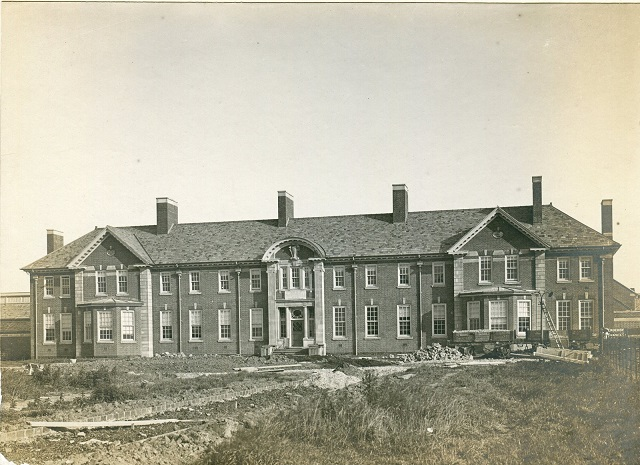
- Carlton Hayes Hospital

- Shown in Leicestershire

Geography
- Location: Narborough, England, United Kingdom

Organisation
- Care system: Public NHS
- Type: Public

Services
- Emergency department: No Accident & Emergency

History
- Founded: 1907
- Closed: 1995

Links
- Lists: Hospitals in England

Carlton Hayes Hospital, Narborough, Leicestershire was the psychiatric hospital of Leicestershire from 1907 to 1995.

== History ==
The complex was built to the designs of Samuel Perkins Pick (1858-1919), a well-known Leicester architect, in the Art Nouveau style as the Leicestershire County Asylum and was officially opened on 1 October 1907. It became known as the Leicestershire and Rutland Mental Hospital in 1914.

Significant extensions designed by William Keay were completed in the 1930s. It became Carlton Hayes Hospital in 1939 and joined the National Health Service in 1948. Philip Larkin's mother was a patient in the hospital in 1956: he described it as "large and dingy as a London terminus".

The complex was demolished after 1996, and the site redeveloped by the Alliance & Leicester Building Society for their new headquarters. The only remaining hospital building is the former chapel which is Grade II listed.
