= Crazy paving =

Means of hard-surfacing used outdoors, most often in gardens

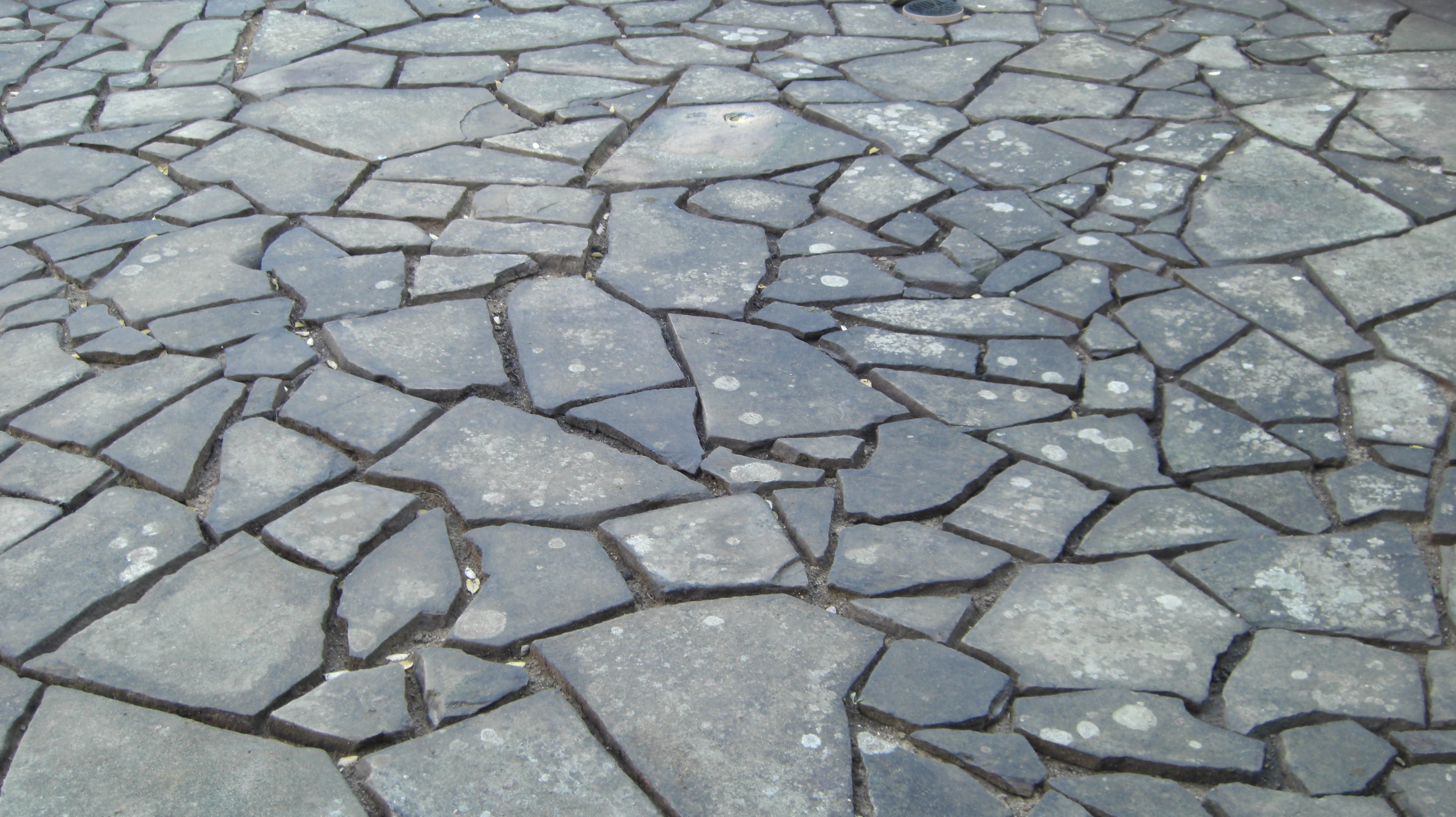
An example of crazy paving

Crazy paving is a means of hard-surfacing used outdoors, most frequently in gardens. Paving stones of irregular size and shape are laid in a haphazard manner sometimes with mortar filling the gaps between.

The method originated in ancient Rome. The design was half-way between mosaic and sectile and primarily used chippings of white and colored limestone. It sets up the paving stones without geometric grid so that they are used as they naturally break as opposed to being cut in geometric shapes.

Crazy paving became popular during the 1970s and the use of just one type of stone is among the modern updates. Today, the hard-surfacing approach is also used as a means to recycle paving materials.

== See also ==
- Crazy quilting
