= John Breedon Everard =

English civil engineer and architect

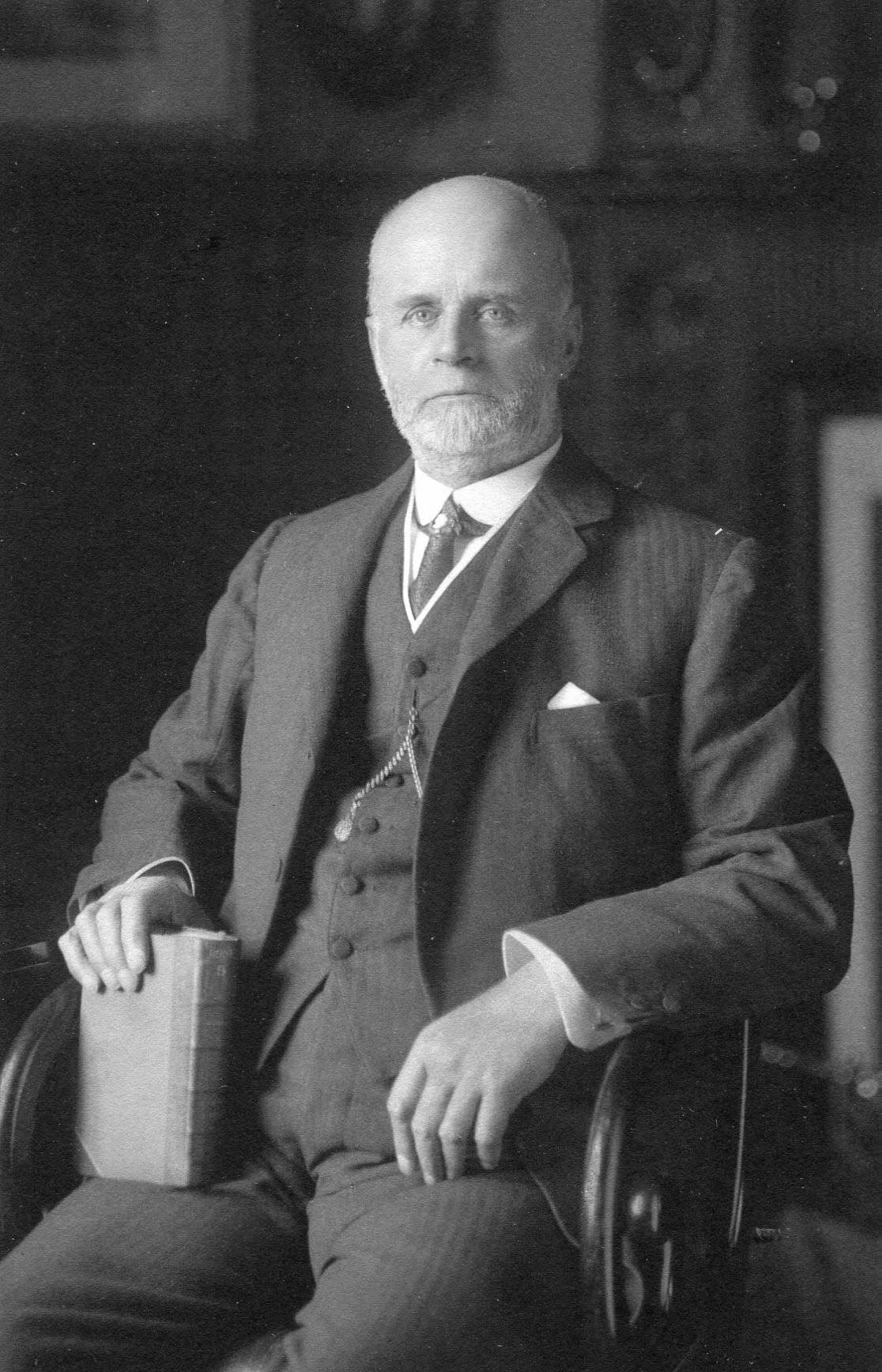
- John Breedon Everard in about 1900.
- Born: 22 September 1844; Groby, Leicestershire, England
- Died: 12 September 1923 (aged 78); Leicester, England.
- Occupation: Architect

John Breedon Everard (22 September 1844 – 12 September 1923) was an English civil engineer and architect strongly associated with works in Leicestershire, and co-founder of the firm Pick Everard.

== Personal life ==
Everard was born in Groby, Leicestershire, the son of a mine and quarry owner, Breedon Everard (1814–1882). In 1868 he married Harriet Selby, daughter of Samuel Mumford of Dartford, Kent. They had four children: Samuel Mumford, a barrister, Bernard Everard, a civil engineer, and two daughters.

== Career ==
In 1862, Everard was articled to John Brown, a partner in Messrs Brown and Jeffcock, a firm of civil and mining engineers in Barnsley and Sheffield, South Yorkshire. In 1866, he was appointed assistant resident engineer on construction of the Kentish Town to St Pancras section of the Midland Railway.

In 1868, Everard set up in practice as a civil engineer in Leicester. He became a partner in the firm of Ellis and Everard (later Aggregate Industries) in 1874, helping in the development of the Bardon Hill quarry and associated worker facilities including a school (1895) and two churches, at Hugglescote (built in two phases, 1878, 1887) and Bardon (1898). Bardon mill house, originally constructed to his design between 1874 and 1878 to house stone-breaking equipment, was doubled in size in 1902.

Everard also specialised in water supply projects. He helped initiate the Derwent Valley scheme supplying water to Leicester, Nottingham, Sheffield and Derby, taking responsibility for the Leicester section of the scheme from Sawley to Hallgates, which included an aqueduct across the River Trent and two covered service reservoirs each holding two million gallons of water. His work also included buildings at Swithland Reservoir, completed in 1896.

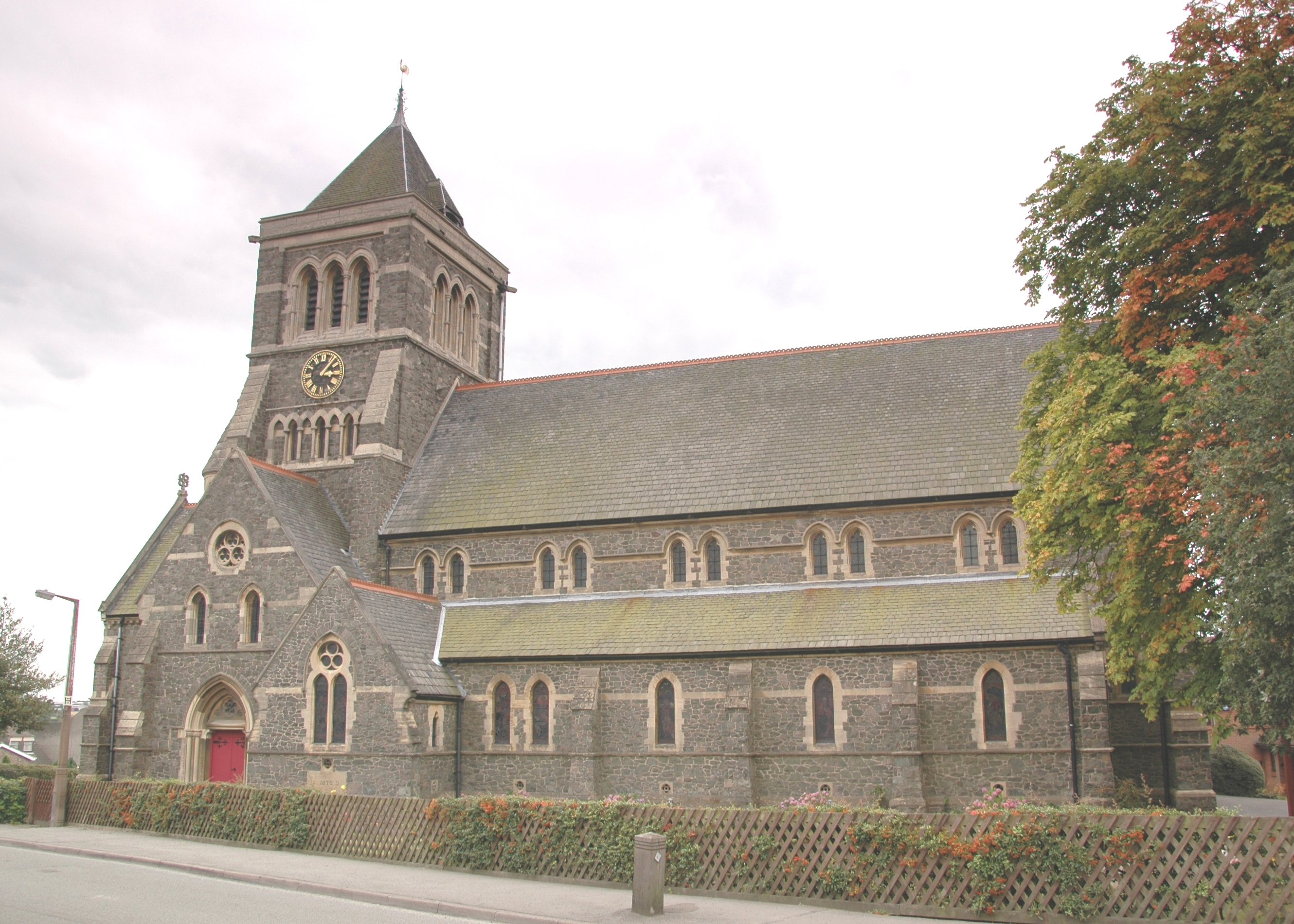
St John the Baptist's church, Hugglescote; by J. B. Everard

Other designs by Everard include:

- A Victorian Turkish baths building in Leicester, opened in Friar Lane in 1872 (now housing the Leicester Law Society Library),
- A new tower brewery in 1875 for his uncle, the brewer William Everard's Everards Brewery at Southgate St, Leicester.
- The Leicestershire South African War Memorial (unveiled in July 1909).

He built himself a large red brick house, Woodville, in Leicester's Knighton Park Road in 1883, and by the end of the century he was in partnership with Samuel Perkins Pick (architect of the County Lunatic Asylum at Narborough, 1904–7). The firm survives to this day as Pick Everard. Everard served as High Sheriff of Leicestershire in 1913.

== Institutions and awards ==
Everard was elected a fellow of the Geological Society in 1870, a member of the Institution of Civil Engineers in 1886, and a fellow of the Royal Institute of British Architects in 1887 (he was also President of the Leicestershire Society of Architects). He was also a member of the Surveyors' Institute and the Mining Institute.
