= Derwent Edge =

Escarpment in United Kingdom

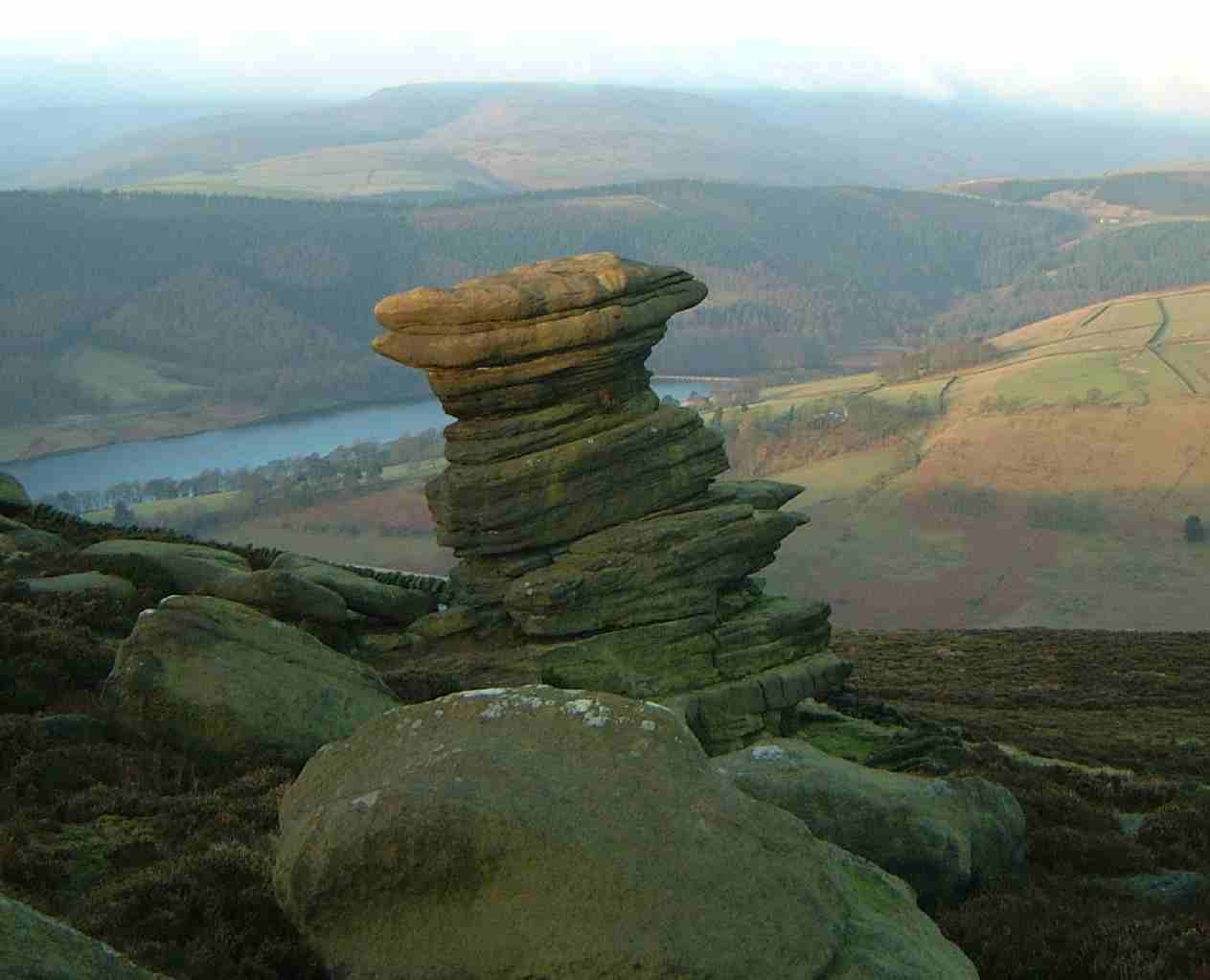
- The Salt Cellar with Ladybower Reservoir in the Background

Highest point
- Elevation: 538 m (1,765 ft)(Back Tor)
- Prominence: 67 m (220 ft)
- Parent peak: Kinder Scout
- Listing: TuMP
- Coordinates: 53.4152°N 1.7041°W (Back Tor)

Geography
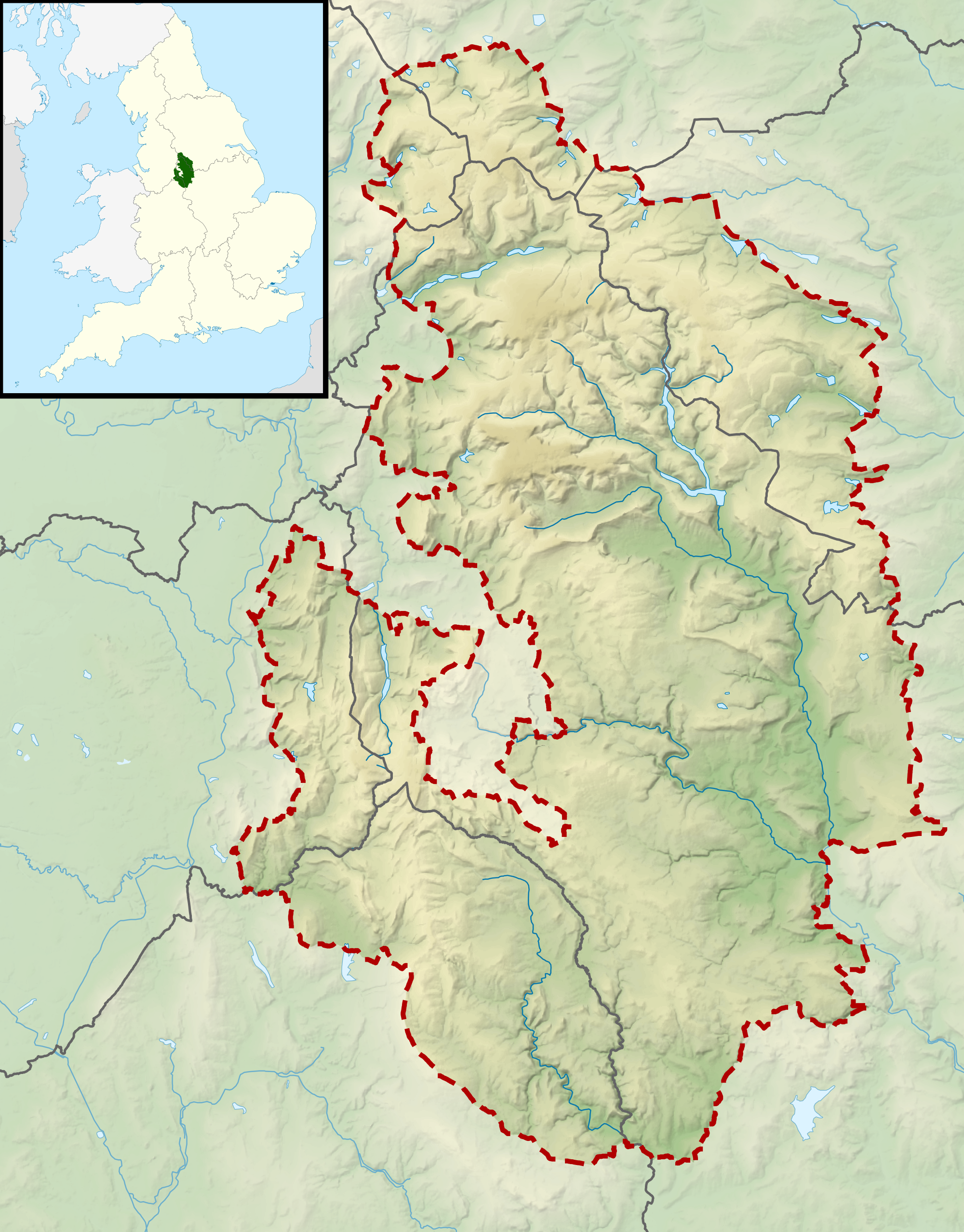
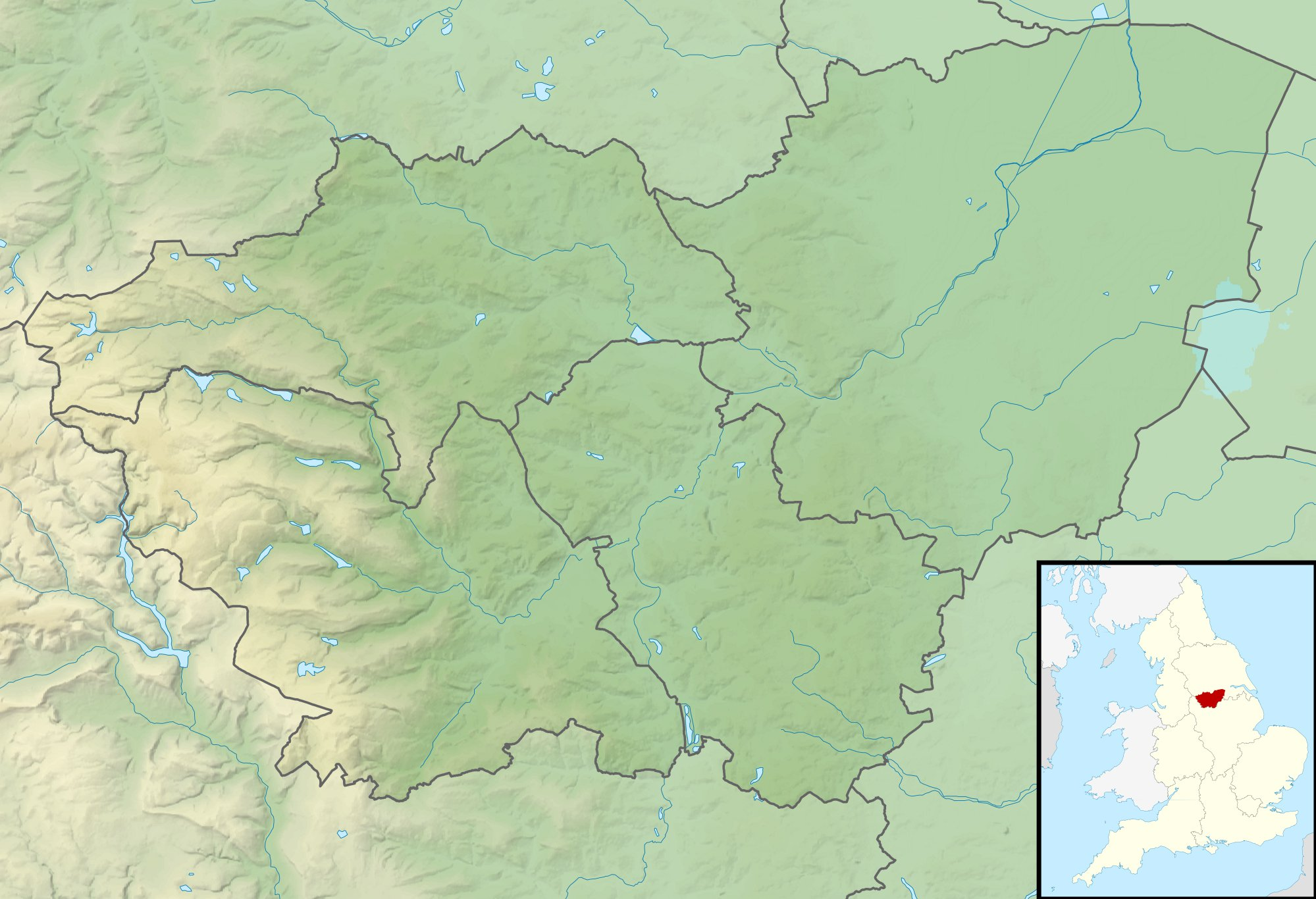
- Location within the Peak District Location within Derbyshire Location within South Yorkshire
- Location: Derbyshire, England
- Parent range: Peak District
- OS grid: SK197909
- Topo map: OS Landranger 110

Derwent Edge is a Millstone Grit escarpment that lies above the Upper Derwent Valley in the Peak District National Park in the English county of Derbyshire. An Ordnance Survey column marks the highest point of the Edge at Back Tor (538 metres, 1765 feet). North of Back Tor the edge extends into Howden Edge and enters the county of South Yorkshire.

== Geography and geology ==
The Millstone Grit forms the edge of the high peat moorland plateau on the eastern side of the valley above Ladybower Reservoir, the edges being the last remains of the gritstone which originally covered all of the Peak District, most of which was scraped off by glaciers in the last ice age.

The Edge itself is notable for its unusual gritstone tors and its views of the Derwent Valley and the Dark Peak landscape; these features along with its proximity to Sheffield have made it a popular venue for walkers. Its popularity has led to substantial path erosion and the most affected parts of the edge between The Salt Cellar and Lost Lad Hillend have been paved with natural stone slabs to reduce further damage as part of the Lottery Paths Project.

== Tors ==
Derwent Edge has several examples of unusually shaped gritstone tors that have been formed by erosion from wind, rain, and frost over many centuries. These tors have been named over the years by local residents and have now been officially titled on Ordnance Survey maps. These include the Cakes of Bread, the Coach and Horses, and the Salt Cellar. The Coach and Horses (also known as the Wheel Stones on Ordnance Survey maps) resemble a person on a carriage with horses when viewed from the A57 road to the south. Lost Lad Hillend has a stone-built topographic indicator to aid in identifying land marks in the extensive view.

== Walking ==
Derwent Edge is popular with walkers and is described in many walking guides. Mark Richards describes a 10.5-mile walk in his book “High Peak Walks” (ISBN 0-902363-43-3), starting at the Fairholmes car park in the Upper Derwent Valley (Grid Reference SK172893) at the northern end of Ladybower Reservoir; it is also possible to access the edge from Cutthroat Bridge (lay by parking) on the A57 (SK216873) or from Strines Reservoir car park (SK220909) near the Strines public house. The outcrops along Derwent Edge are popular with rock climbers, particularly the largest, Dovestone Tor, which has about 50 different routes ranging from difficult to Extremely Severe; however, it is not as well used as the nearby Stanage Edge.

== Conservation ==
Much of the moorland around Derwent Edge has been declared a Site of Special Scientific Interest (SSSI) because of its special vegetation and rare birds and animals, such as the Eurasian golden plover, red grouse, ring ouzel and mountain hare. Species of plants such as common cottongrass, bilberry, mountain strawberry, and crowberry grow in the area.

It has been proposed as a Special Protection Area for birds under the European Directive on the conservation of wild birds. The edge is part of the National Trust's High Peak Estate and visitors are free to roam at will but are urged to keep to established routes to avoid disturbing breeding birds. There are occasional times when the moors are closed for management purposes and grouse shooting – signs are posted at these times.

== Gallery ==
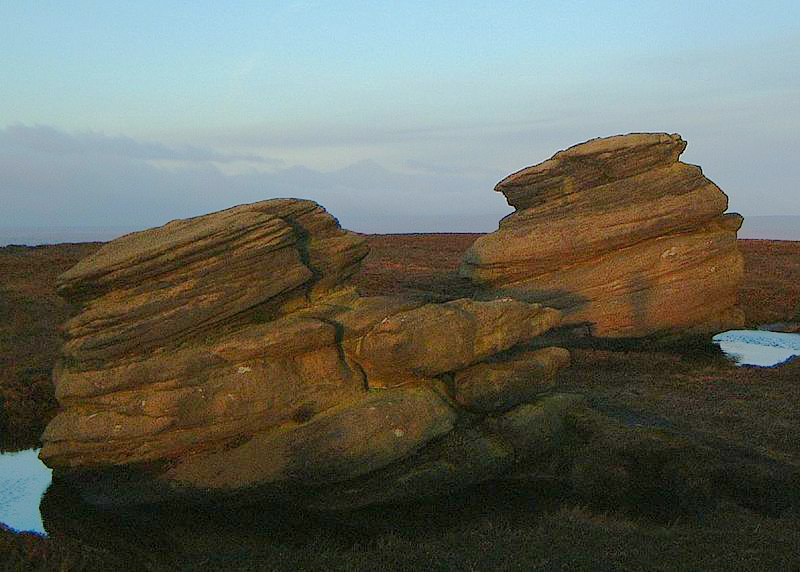
The Cakes of Bread, about 15 ft (4.6 m) high

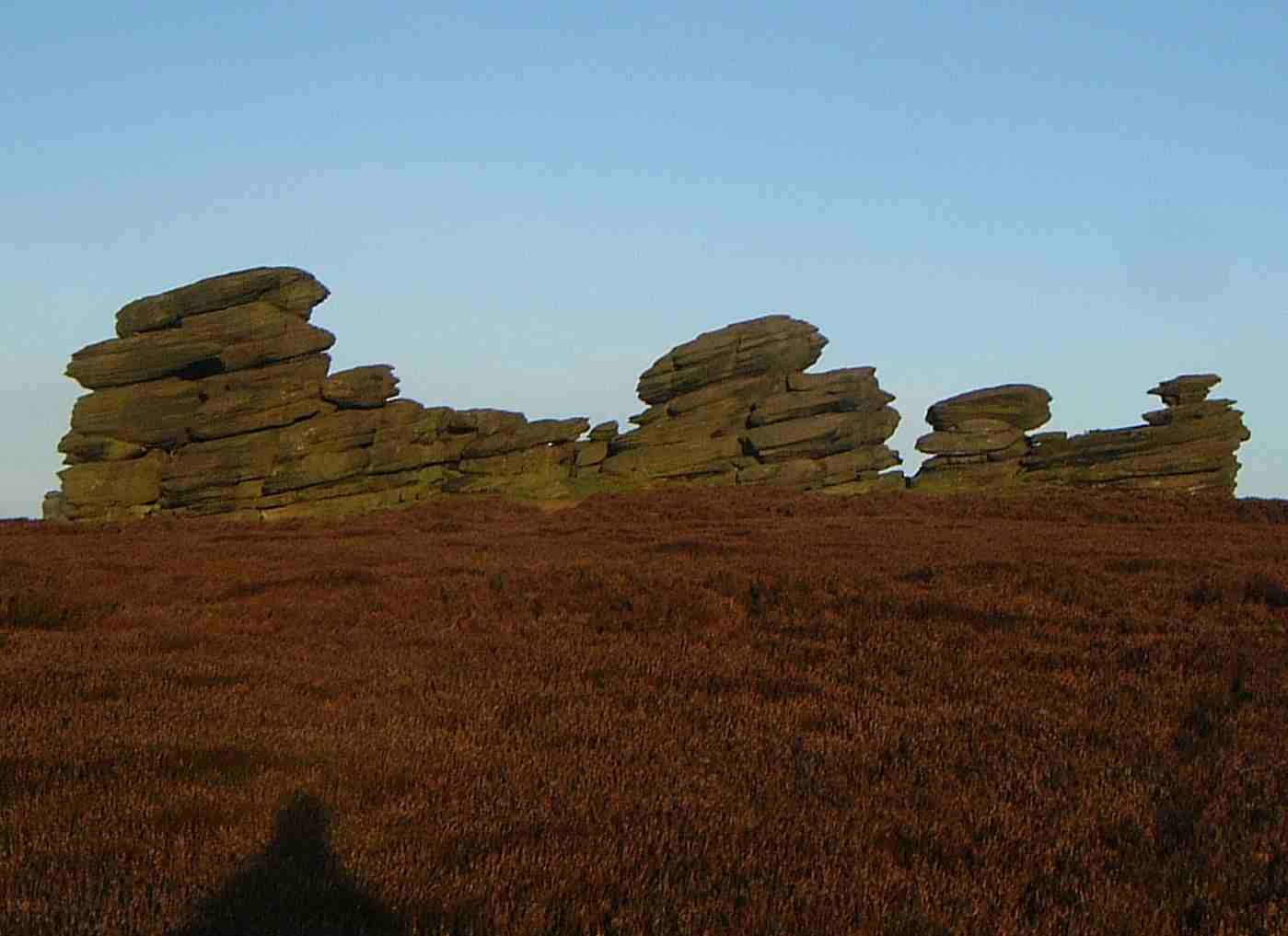
The Coach and Horse or Wheel Stones, about 25 ft (7.6 m) high

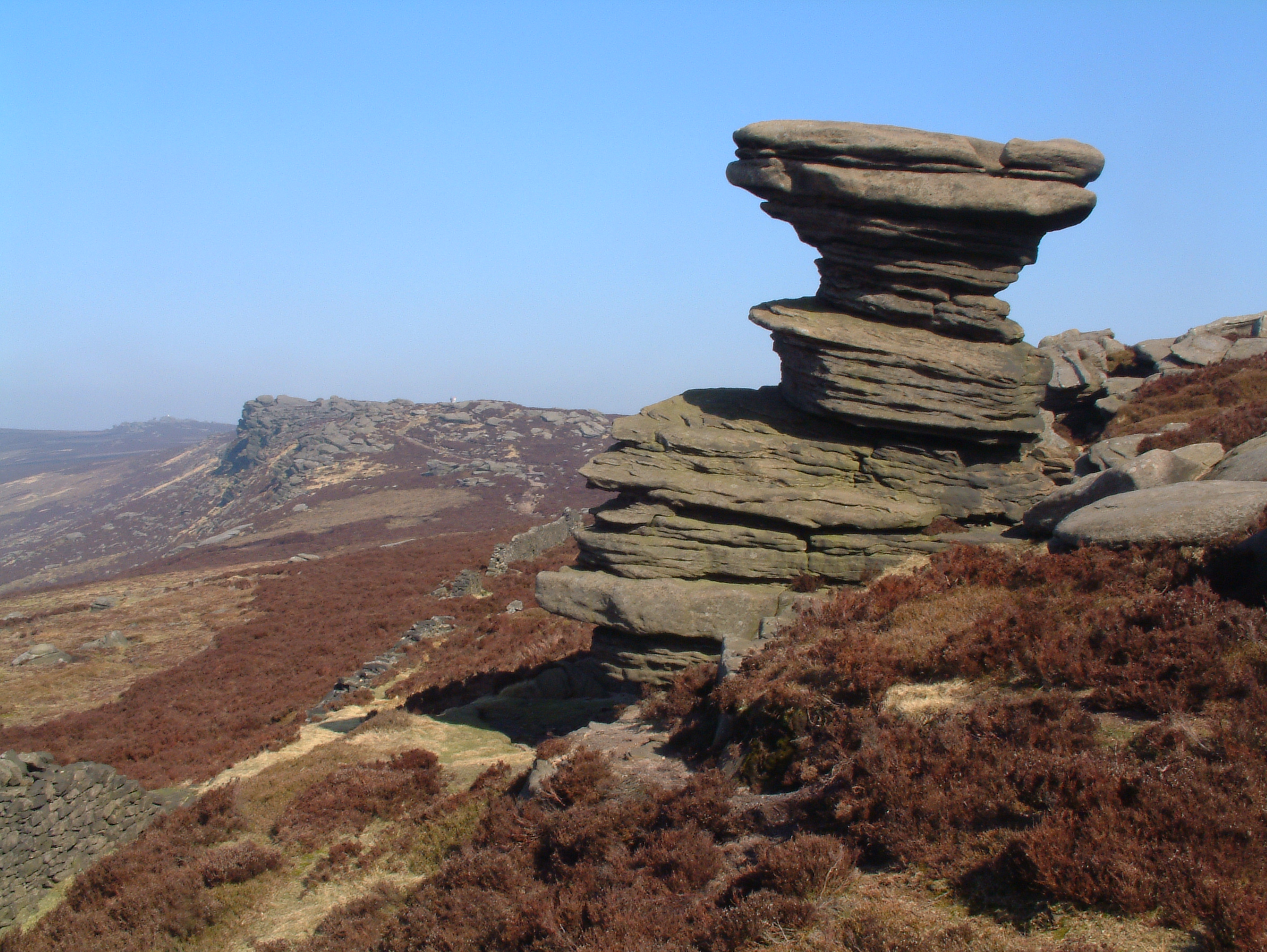
Salt Cellar with the edge visible in the background

== Bibliography ==
- Richards, Mark (1985). High Peak Walks. Cicerone Press. ISBN 0-902363-43-3.
