= Bardon Hill Quarry =

Quarry and Site of Special Scientific Interest in England

Coordinates: 52.711°N 1.329°W

- Site of Special Scientific Interest
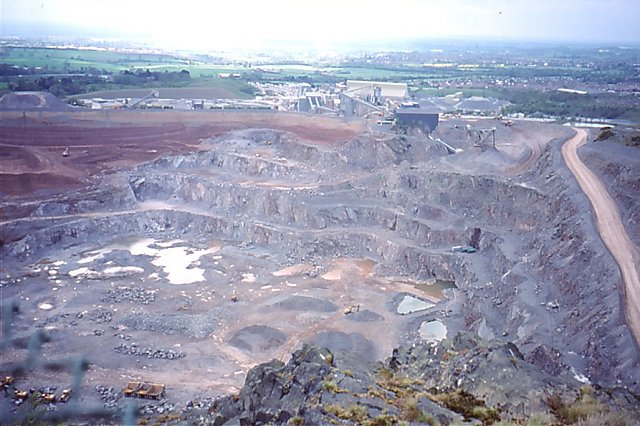
- Location of Bardon Hill Quarry.
- Area of search: Leicestershire
- Grid reference: SK 456 130
- Interest: Geological
- Area: 58.2 hectares
- Notification date: 1987
- Location map: Magic Map

Bardon Hill Quarry is a 58.2-hectare (144-acre) geological Site of Special Scientific Interest east of Coalville in Leicestershire. It is a Geological Conservation Review site.

This quarry has been operated for over 400 years and produces three million tonnes of rock a year, 15% of UK output. It exposes rocks from an andesitic Precambrian volcano, similar to the 1995 Montserrat eruption, about 570 million years ago. There are veins of quartz containing copper and gold.

There is no public access to the site.
