= Everards =

Regional brewery in Leicester, England

- Company type: Privately held company
- Industry: Brewery
- Founded: 1849
- Headquarters: Leicester, England, UK
- Production output: c.50,000 barrels a year
- Website: www.everards.co.uk

Everards is a regional brewery based in Leicester and founded in 1849 by William Everard and Thomas Hull. It produces cask ales and owns over 170 tenanted pubs, mainly around the Leicestershire area. Its chairman is fifth generation Richard Everard.

== History ==
The company began as Hull and Everard in 1849 when William Everard, a farmer from Narborough Wood House and brewer Thomas Hull leased the Southgate Street Brewery of Wilmot and Co from the retiring proprietors. Although Hull continued as a maltster, Everard was the driving force behind the business which he managed until his death in 1892.

The business expanded as the company progressively acquired outlets, with over 100 pubs by the late 1880s. In 1875, the company moved to a new state of the art tower brewery designed by William's nephew architect John Breedon Everard. The brewery, on the corner of Southgate St and Castle St extracted very pure water from wells 300 feet deep beneath the premises and steam engines played a significant part in the mechanisation.

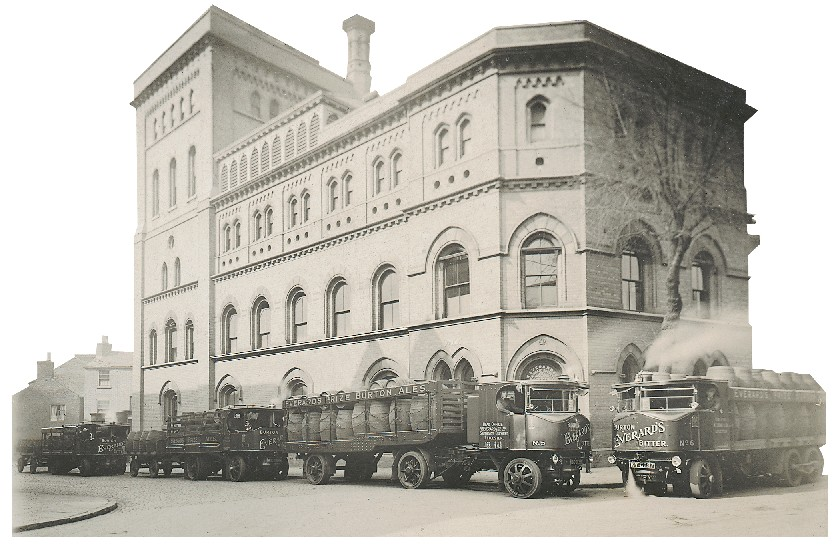
New Everards brewery on the corner of Southgate St and Castle St built in 1875

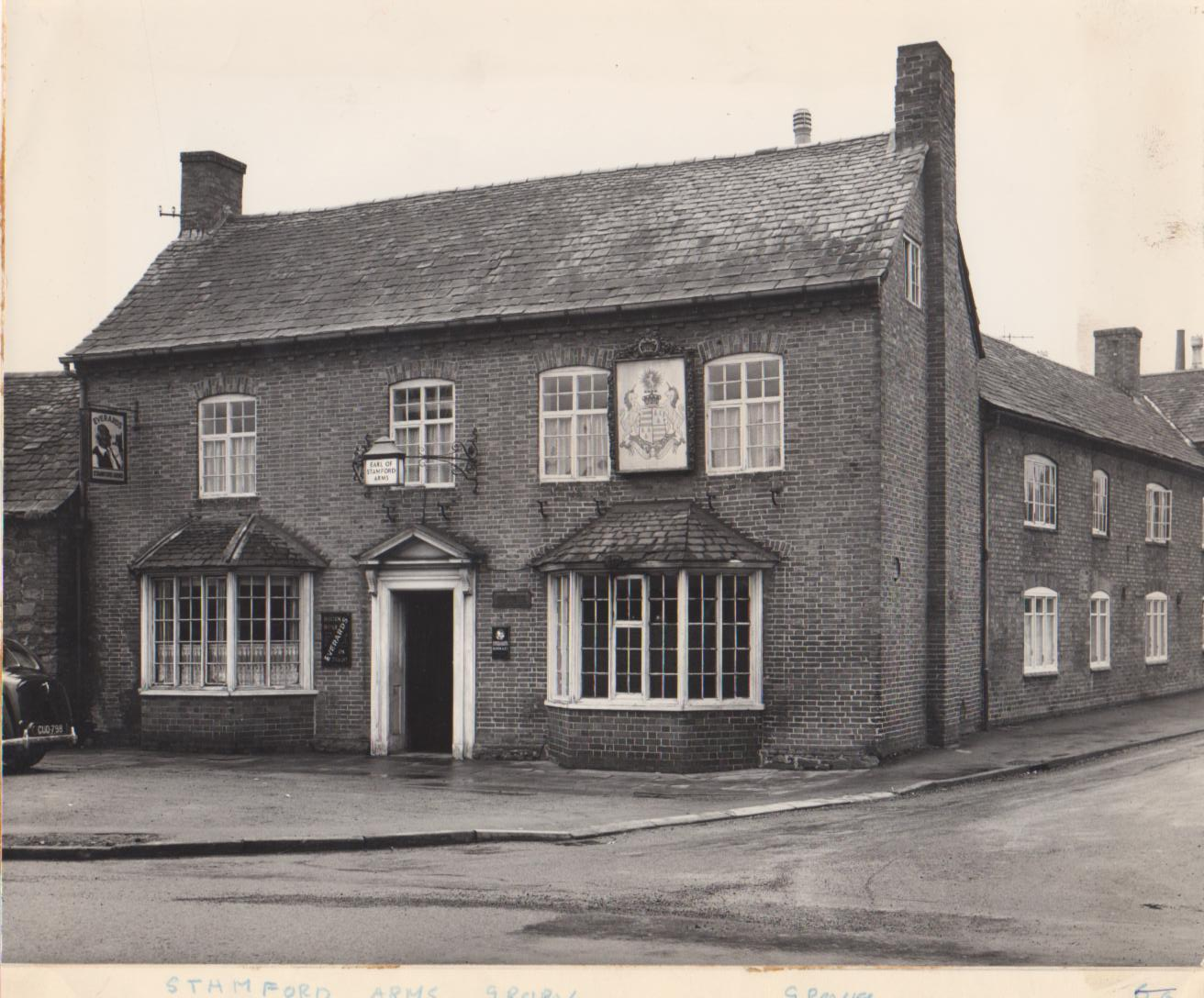
Stamford Arms Groby, Home of Thomas Everard's grandfather and great-grandfather which became part of the estate in 1921

After the death of William, control passed to his son Thomas. The historic centre of the UK brewing industry remained some 40 miles away at Burton-upon-Trent, which by the 1890s produced one tenth of Britain's beer. Everard's leased the Bridge Brewery on Umplett Green island in 1895 but its 10,000 barrels per year capacity proved insufficient. It was replaced with the newer Trent brewery in Dale St which became available after going into liquidation in 1898. The Southgate brewery remained the distribution centre to the Leicestershire pubs with beer arriving by rail from Burton. The Trent brewery was purchased outright in 1901.(sources differ) It was renamed the Tiger Brewery around 1970.

Beer production was seriously affected by World War I, both due to recruitment and the Defence of the Realm Act 1914 which required beer to be diluted, restricted opening times and rationed raw materials.

Around 1920 Everards bought wine and spirit merchants John Sarsons & Son of Hotel St, Leicester, a major supplier to wealthy homes.

Thomas moved his family from Narborough Wood House to Nanpantan Hall. In 1909 he opened a cattle trough in Groby on behalf of the Metropolitan Drinking Fountain and Cattle Trough Association. and in 1921, a year which saw beer production peak at 55,000 barrels, the company acquired the Stamford Arms in Groby, the former home of both Thomas's grandfather, Richard Everard a yeoman tenant farmer of the Grey estate and his great-grandfather.

In 1924, the company completed its move away from rail transport to steam powered drays which continued in use until replaced by petrol lorries in 1946.

Thomas died in 1925 and was succeeded by his son William Lindsay Everard who lived in Ratcliffe Hall.

The Great Depression saw a penny tax on beer. Production fell by a fifth and took five years to recover and all brewing ceased at Southgate in 1931.

Everards became a public company, Everards Brewery Ltd. in October 1936.

Following the outbreak of World War II, the Government increased excise duty tripling the price of a pint by the end of the war. A combination of conscription and a shortage of hops reduced the Leicester operation at times to 3 men.

Following Sir Lindsay's death in 1949, his son Tony Everard, who had been wounded in Normandy in 1944, took over. In the 1950s he developed the concept of "Everards Friendly Inns" designed to "look like your front room" which succeeded in attracting women into what was traditionally a male preserve. In November 1950 the first long service awards were made at a dinner to found the Quarter Century club. Although pubs rarely came onto the market, the demolition of a number of older ones during construction of the Leicester inner ringroad in the sixties allowed the company to build new ones such as the Shakespeare in Braunstone and the Firs at Wigston. In 1967 the company employed almost 700 staff and operated 125 pubs.

Like his father Tony had a keen interest in aviation and in 1966 he founded the Helicopter Club of Great Britain and opened a heliport at Ratcliffe. The Airman's Rest hotel in Leicester Forest East was designed to welcome fliers and equipped with a heliport.

In 1979 the company bought 54 hectares at Grove Farm triangle and phase I of the new brewery -named Castle acres after the Castle street premises – was opened on 29 March 1985 by local MP Nigel Lawson. It had a capacity of 125 barrels of Old Original per year. The Tiger brewery in Burton became a museum though it continued to produce Tiger under contract. By 1990, Castle Acres was producing nearly 70,000 barrels, the contract with the museum ended and for the first time since 1892, all Everards beer was brewed in Leicester.

In 1988 Richard Everard, nephew of Tony, became chairman. He confirmed that Everards would remain an independent family business and in 1997 it repurchased its remaining preference shares to become a private business again. The company also invested in budget hotels, named 'Original Inns' based around existing pubs. In February 1999, the company celebrated its first 150 years with a visit from Prince Philip, Duke of Edinburgh. Celebrations, perhaps as befitting a brewery, "continued throughout the year," and included the pubs. The 'Founders day' saw Richard Everard presented with a bronze figure of a tiger sculpted by Mark Coreth. In 2002, the company decided to switch its portfolio from a mixture of tenancies and managed houses to tenancies only. This led to new pubs replacing hotels and the estate achieved its highest total of 165 by 2005.

== Beers ==
Everards brews four core brands (listed below) and a range of seasonal ales which in 2008-9 included Equinox (September), Sleighbell (December), Pitch Black (February) and Sly Fox (March / April).

- Beacon (3.8%) A lighter product than Tiger, named after Beacon Hill, Leicestershire and launched in the early 1970s.
- Tiger (4.2%) First produced in 1972 named for the nickname of the Leicestershire Regiment. Originally known as Best Bitter. The company also adopted the tiger as its logo and will sponsor the Leicester Tigers rugby club until 2018.
- Original (5.2%) Formerly Old Original, an old ale first produced in 1978 and the first Everards beer advertised on television. In 2022 this was again being marketed as Old Original.
- Sunchaser (4.0%)
