= History of quilting =

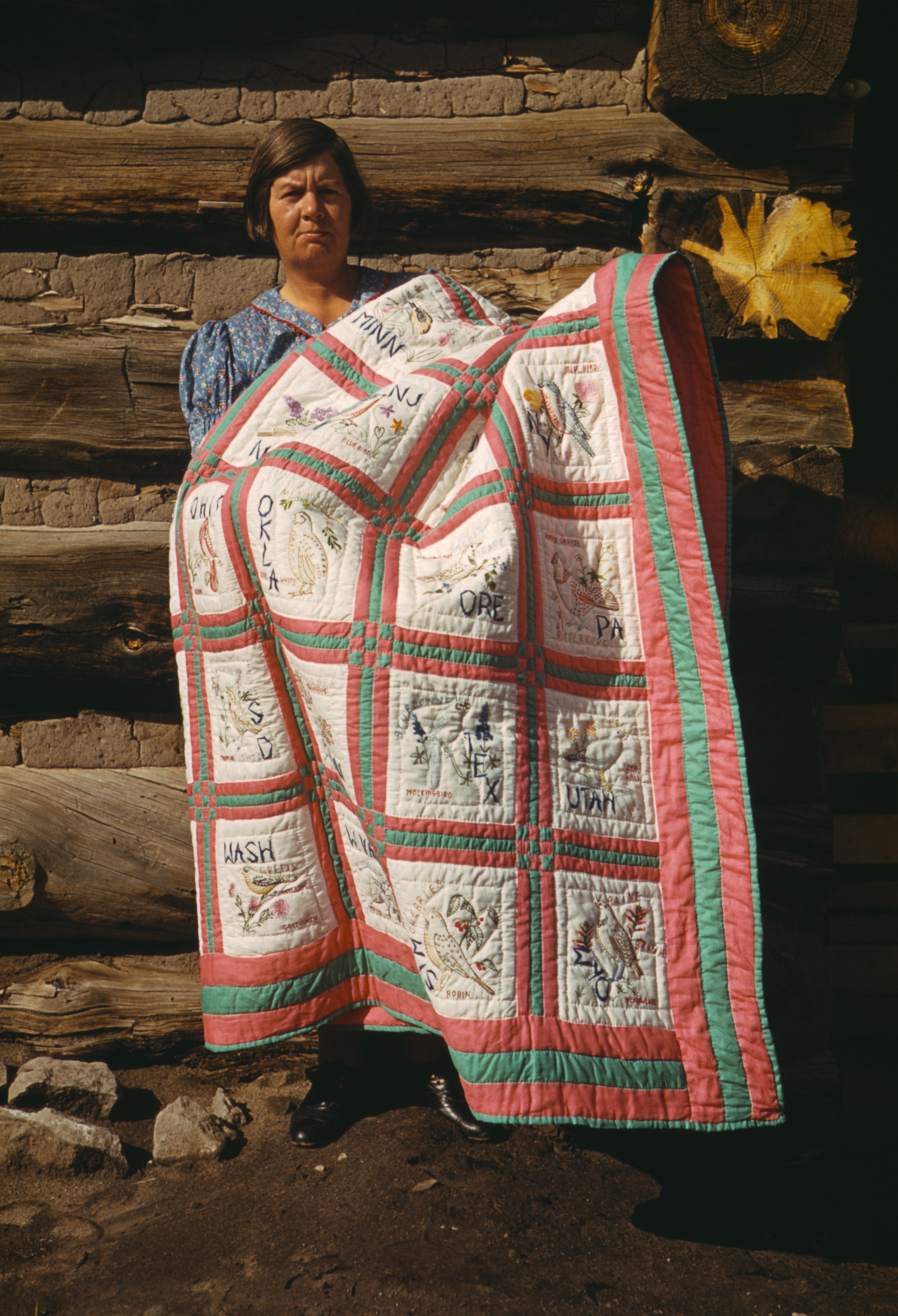
Mrs. Bill Stagg of Pie Town, New Mexico with her patchwork and embroidery quilt that displays all the United States state flowers and birds, October 1940.

The history of quilting, the stitching together of layers of padding and fabric, may date back as far as 3400 BCE. For much of its history, quilting was primarily a practical technique to provide physical protection and insulation. However, decorative elements were often also present, and many quilts are now primarily art pieces. Quilting appears on more than just quilts, it is also found on clothing, jackets in particular.

== Early examples ==
Whole-cloth quilt, 18th century, Netherlands. Textile made in India.

The oldest surviving example of a quilted piece is a linen carpet found in a Mongolian cave, dated to between 100 BCE and 200 CE. It is now kept at the Saint Petersburg department of the Russian Academy of Sciences, Archaeology Section.

One of the earliest existing decorative quilts is the Tristan Quilt, made around 1390 in Sicily. The quilt was made in the trapunto (stuffed) style and embroidered with brown and white linen thread on linen fabric. There are two related pieces, which may be pieces of an original larger quilt or from quilts made as a pair. One is held by the Victoria & Albert Museum and the other by the Bargello.

== Australia ==
The National Gallery of Australia has a 3-by-3-metre (9.8 by 9.8 ft) quilt known as the Rajah Quilt. It was created by about 30 convict women as they were transported from Woolwich, England to Hobart, Tasmania in 1841. The quilt was rediscovered in Scotland in 1989. It is a medallion quilt with Broderie perse at its centre.

== India ==
Quilts known as sujni kantha, created in the tradition of nakshi kantha, were common in nineteenth-century Bengal, India. They were created from old cotton clothing stitched together with running stitch using threads from sari borders--usually in red, black, and yellow. Common elements quilted on them included fish, lotuses, the tree of life, gods and goddesses, and ordinary people.

== South Africa ==
The earliest known examples of quilts in South Africa come from British and Irish colonization. Quilting traditions were also influenced by Indian immigrants. However, particularly prior to the end of apartheid, interest in quilting was largely limited to those of European (and particularly British) descent.

== Sweden ==
Quilts were owned by Swedish nobility during the Middle Ages, and patchwork and applique were also used for clothing and interior furnishing. Examples appear in the death inventory of Queen Margaret Leijonhufvud and among the belongings of King Gustav Vasa.

Early patchwork quilts, prior to the introduction of factory fabric production in 1870, were mostly made of silk and were generally limited to wealthy homes. After 1870, the middle class began to produce patchwork quilts from dressmaking scraps, usually with a plain cotton backing and wool, flax, or cotton batting.

Between 1870 and 1930, it became common to include patchwork quilts as part of special occasions like weddings. These sometimes took the form of monogram quilts, patchwork quilts created after a wedding with the bridal couple's monogram.

Patchwork quilting began to decline between the 1920s and the 1930s. Patchwork quilts became less ornate, and the increased availability of factory-made clothing, comforters, and blankets made them increasingly obsolete.

== United Kingdom ==
In seventeenth-century Britain, quilting was used on articles of clothing including silk doublets, breeches, petticoats, jackets, and waistcoats. Quilts were produced in cities including London, Canterbury, and Exeter. British people also imported quilts made of chintz from India. In addition, women in many households created quilts for personal use, sometimes for practical reasons and sometimes to mark an occasion or as part of a dowry.

In the 18th century and earlier, bedrooms of the wealthy were much more social places than they are now. Guests were invited into bedrooms, and thus they were a logical place to have luxury items. Bed hangings and quilts fulfilled the desire to display richly ornamented goods. The households of the middle-class also displayed such textiles. These items might have been bought ready-made, or crafted from fabrics recycled by the household.

In the early 1800s, printed cottons were widely imported into the UK. These light, colorful fabrics were used both for clothing and household items. Those who wished to use them in patchwork for quilts were able to buy pieces from dressmakers and tailors. The Victoria and Albert Museum holds many examples of patchwork quilts from the nineteenth century, which often included intricate designs. Patchwork declined over the twentieth century, but found new uses towards the end of the century, as a hippie fashion look and as an artistic technique.

== United States ==
Quilt making was common in the late 17th century and early years of the 18th century. Colonial quilts were not usually made of leftover scraps or worn clothing as a humble bedcovering during this period but were decorative items that displayed the fine needlework of the maker. Only the wealthy could afford to import fabric for quilts, so such quilting was done by only a few. Commercial blankets or woven coverlets were a more economical bedcovering for most people.

Whole cloth quilts, broderie perse and medallion quilts were the styles of quilts made during the early 19th century, but from 1840 onward the use of piecework and blocks, often made from printed fabric, became much more common.

Quilting is now a popular hobby, with an estimated base of twenty-one million quilters.

=== Wholecloth quilts ===
Early wholecloth bed quilts which may appear to be a solid piece of fabric are actually composed of strips of fabric, since early looms could not produce widths of cloth large enough to cover an entire bed surface. Early quilts that feature the same fabric for the entire quilt top, whether that top is made of dyed wool or pieces of (the same) printed cotton fabric, are referred to as wholecloth quilts. Early wholecloth quilts have three layers: a quilt top, a filling (in early quilts the filler was often wool), and a backing. The three layers are held together via quilting stitches worked by hand, in an age before sewing machines were marketed. In wholecloth quilts, the quilting stitches themselves serve as the only decoration. The earliest whole cloth quilts found in America were brought from Europe. Initially, quilts were owned by the wealthy in America who had the means to purchase imported quilts.

The collection of the Lovely Lane Museum in Baltimore, Maryland contains a quilt believed to have been carried onshore by the Cogswell family who embarked from Bristol, England en route to Bristol, Maine in 1635. Once the passengers were safely on shore, the galleon "Angel Gabriel", moored in Pemaquid Bay, was completely destroyed when the Great Colonial Hurricane of 1635 rushed up the coast from Naragansett, Rhode Island, leaving the ship as just a mass of floating debris after it was hit with the strongest winds ever recorded.

The Canton Historical Society in Canton, Massachusetts believes that a wholecloth quilt in their collection may be the oldest wholecloth quilt made in America. The wool wholecloth quilt was made in 1786 by Martha Crafts Howard.

The Buckingham Quilt surfaced in 2014. It was made by the wife of Reverend Thomas Buckingham, one of the founders of Yale University, and passed down through nine generations. It is among the oldest wholecloth quilts made in America (circa 1660s).

A more complete survey is needed to compare all of the wholecloth quilts held in the many museum locations who have collected such textiles. Many early quilts did not survive the test of time or were discarded, or if they survived, the name of the quilter was lost to history. For a time, the trend in wholecloth quilting was a preference for all-cotton white quilts.

Many of the beautiful surviving wholecloth quilts feature feather designs, outlines of flowers, or are based on other designs taken from nature motifs. Some were made even more exquisite by the use of stuffed and corded quilting, a method sometimes called trapunto. Trapunto is an Italian word used to describe the technique of slipping extra stuffing into certain areas of a quilt to create areas of raised motifs that stand in relief. For example, stuffing placed inside the quilted outline of a feather or flower makes the design stands out. Women were sometimes proud of their finely wrought and evenly spaced quilting stitches in their wholecloth quilts. This type of quilting seems to be experiencing a revival today and some quilt stores sell pre-marked quilt tops ready to be layered and quilted, either by hand or by machine.

=== Broderie perse quilts ===
Broderie perse refers to the technique of cutting motifs from printed fabric and appliquéing them onto a solid background. This form of quilt making has been done since the 18th century. The popular printed fabric during this period was chintz imported from India.

Printed fabric was expensive even for those who were well off. By cutting out birds, flowers and other motifs from printed fabric and sewing them onto a large homespun cloth, a beautiful bedspread could be made. The technique was also used on some early medallion quilts as in the example.

Broderie perse bedcoverings were usually used on the best bed or sometimes only when guests were staying in the home.

=== Medallion quilts ===
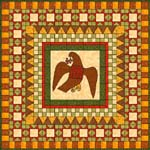
Example of a medallion quilt with applique.

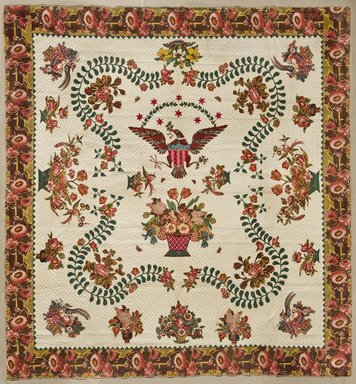
Elizabeth Welsh. Medallion Quilt, c. 1830. Cotton. Brooklyn Museum

Medallion quilts are made with elaborate borders around a printed or patchwork center. The center was sometimes a solid piece of large-scale fabric like a toile or a Tree of Life, an appliqued motif or a large pieced star or other pieced pattern. The central area was surrounded by two or more borders. Although some borders were solid, many were pieced or appliqued.

=== Mid-19th century ===
Changes came about as progress in technology deeply affected the number and styles of quilts made during the middle years of the 19th century.

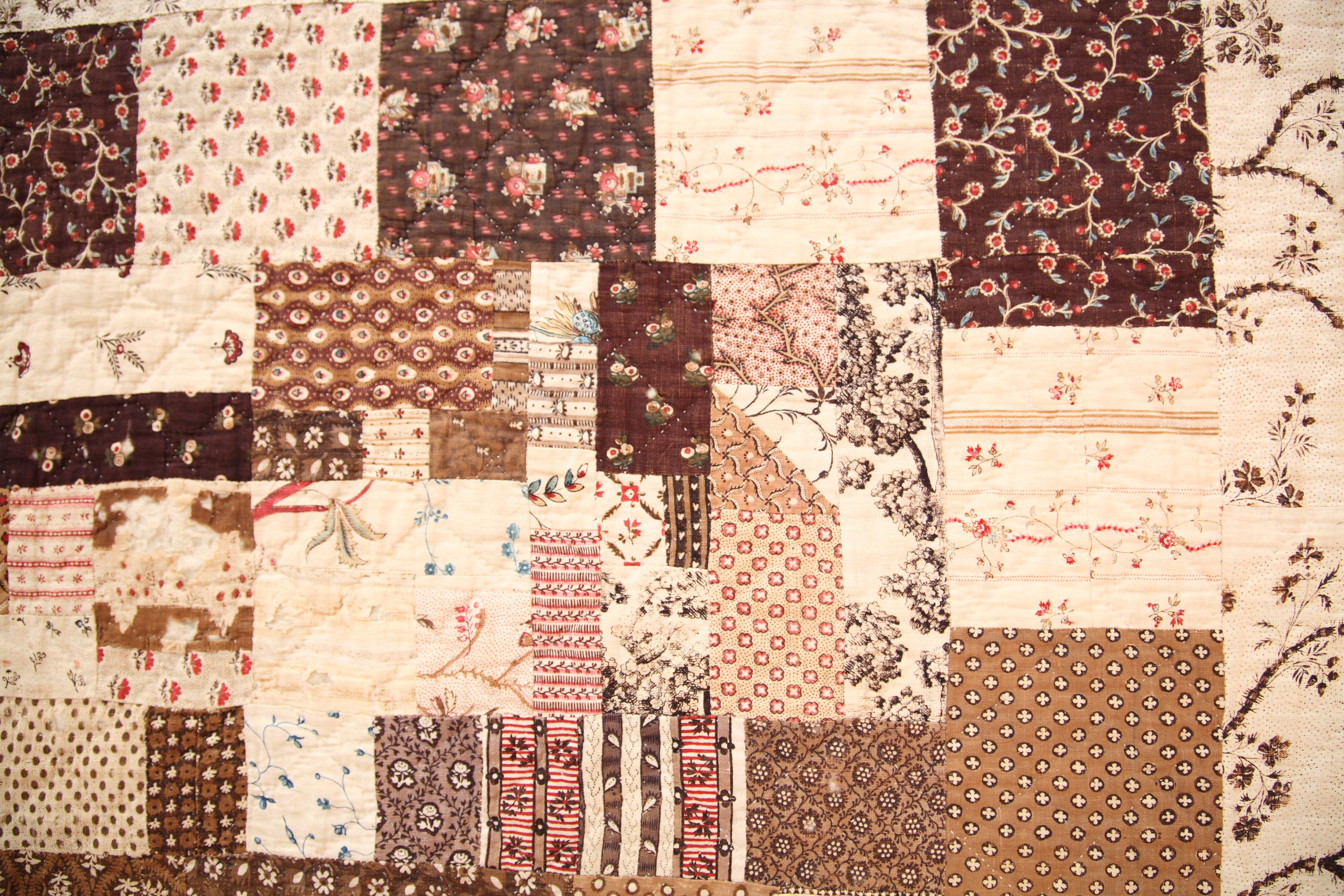
Detail on a medallion quilt

During this period the invention and availability of the sewing machine contributed to quilt making.

=== Civil War era ===
Some abolitionists were active along the Underground Railroad and helped runaway slaves get to safety. There is a popular belief that maintains that certain quilts were used as signals to help slaves in their flight to freedom, stemming from the book Hidden in Plain View. However, there is very little documentation verifying the existence of quilt signals, and most historians find it unlikely. Despite this, the belief in quilt signals persists within quilting folklore.

=== Amish quilting ===
Amish quilts are appreciated for their bold graphic designs, distinctive colour combinations, and exceptional stitching. Quilting became a favoured activity of the Anabaptist sect after emigrating to the United States and Canada from Germany and Switzerland over 250 years ago. The earliest known Amish quilts, dating from 1849, are whole-cloth works in solid colours. Pattern-pieced bed coverings didn't appear until the 1870s. Particular patterns and fabrics are identified with specific Amish communities; for example, pre-1940s quilts from Lancaster County were almost always made of wool while those sewn in Ohio during the same period were commonly made of cotton.

Often these quilts provide the only decoration in a simply furnished home and they also were commonly used for company or to show wealth. Amish religion discourages individual expression but quiltmaking has allowed Amish women to express their creative natures without giving offence. The Amish communities have always encouraged activities that promote community and family closeness so quilting became a fundamental part of social life for the women of the community. Quilts are created for everyday use or to celebrate special occasions such as birthdays, weddings, raising funds for the church or community cause. Since the "English" (the name for non-Amish people) discovered Amish work in the late 1960s, quilting has become a source of income for many. Their quilts have become collector's items all over the world.

== Gallery ==
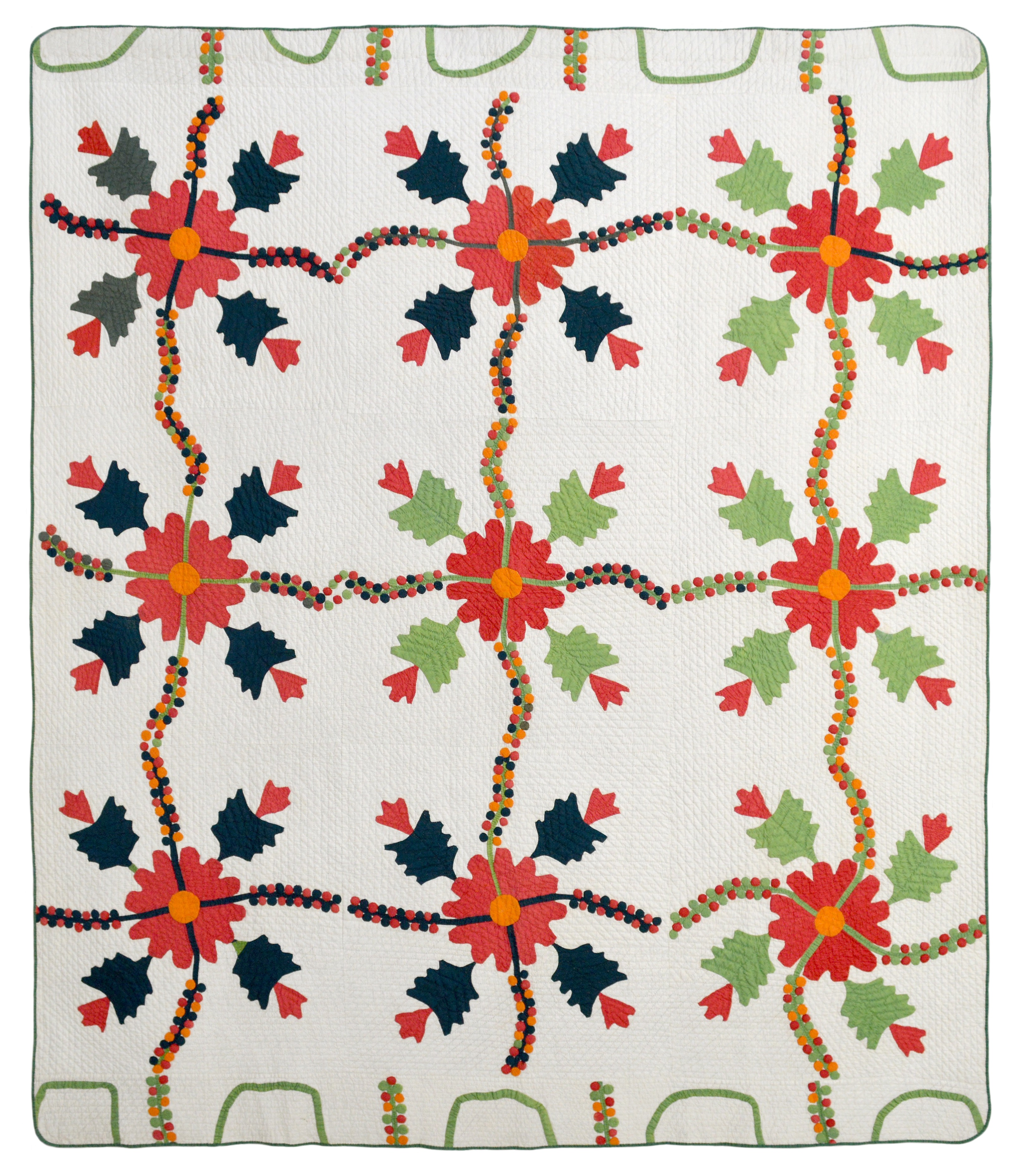
Oak Leaf Variant applique quilt, c. 1860

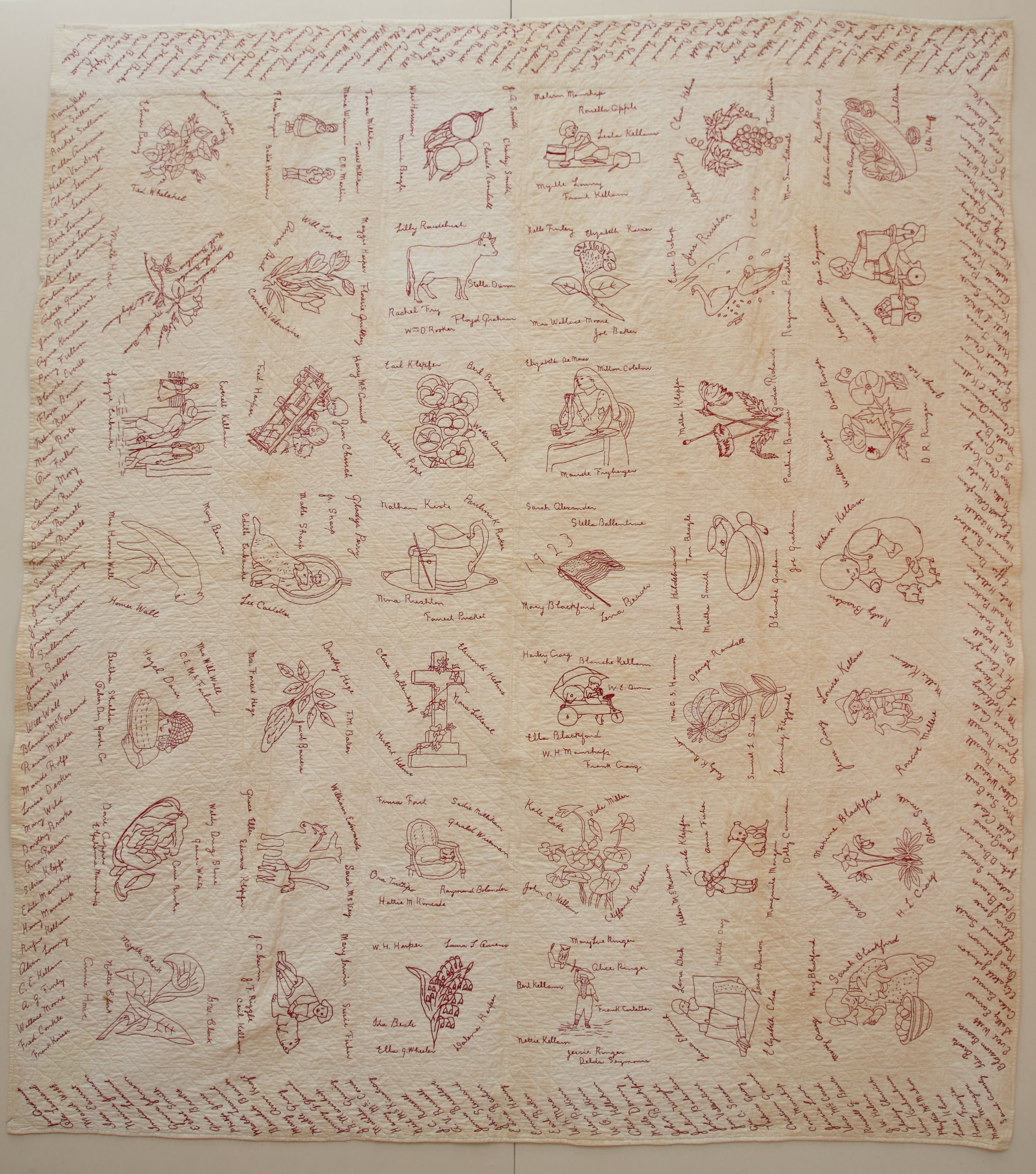
Fundraising quilt

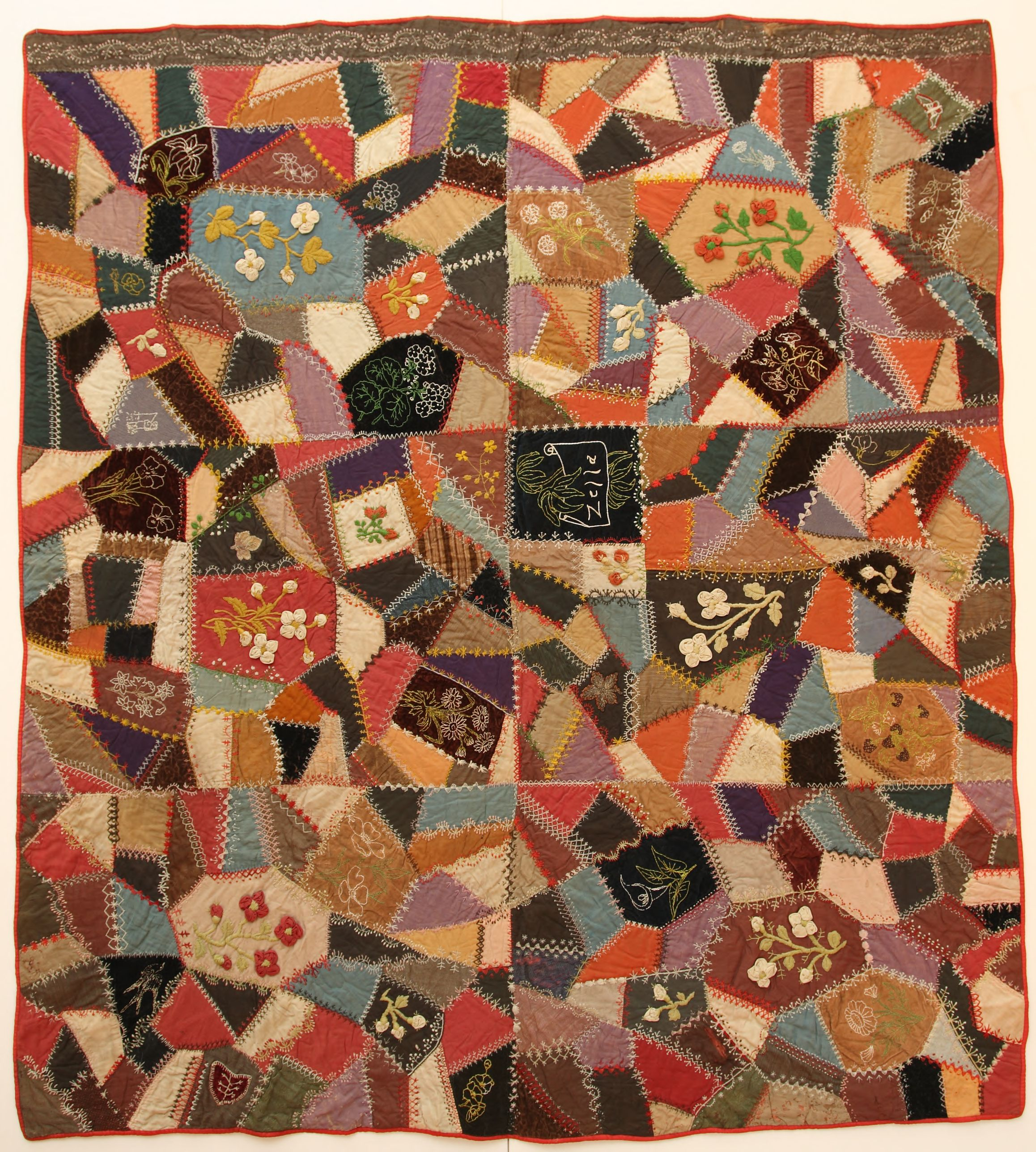
Crazy quilt

== See also ==
- Duvet
- List of quilters
- NAMES Project AIDS Memorial Quilt
- Patchwork quilt
- Quilt art
- Razai
- Southern AIDS Living Quilt
- Tessellation
- Narrative quilting
