= Quilting =

Process of sewing layers of fabric together to make a padded material

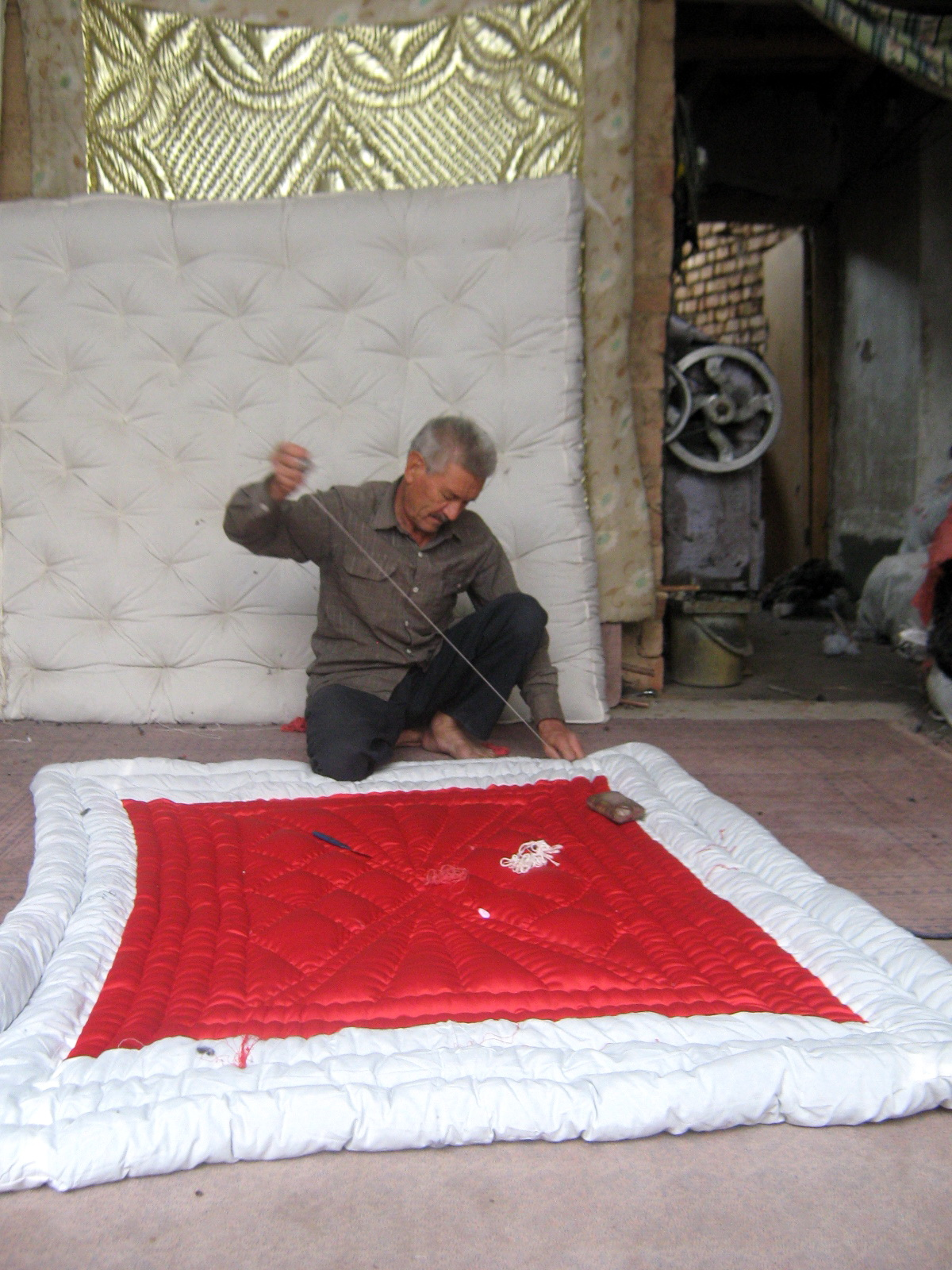
Quilter in Bazaar of Nishapur, Iran

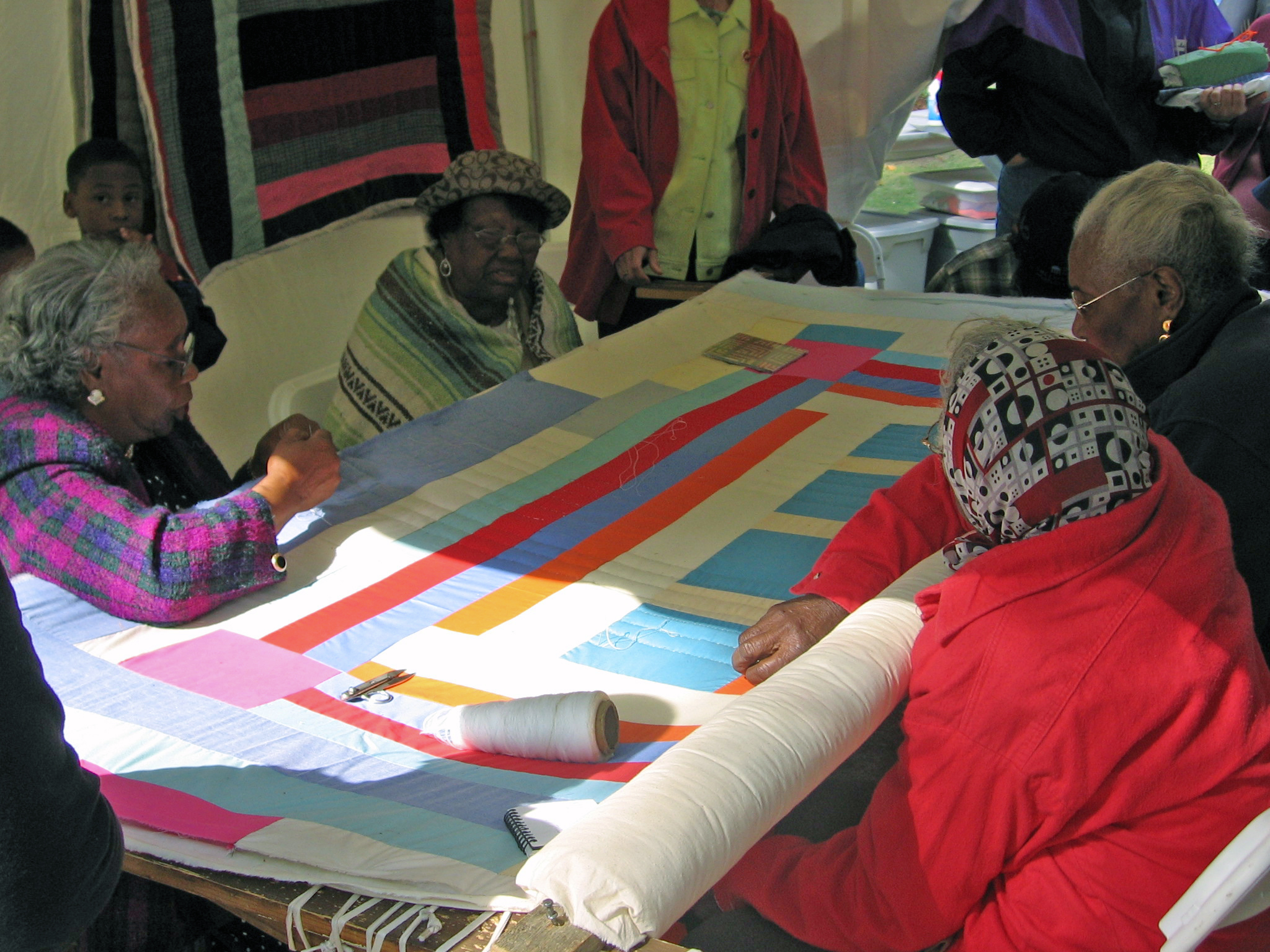
Women of Gee's Bend, Alabama, quilting, 2005

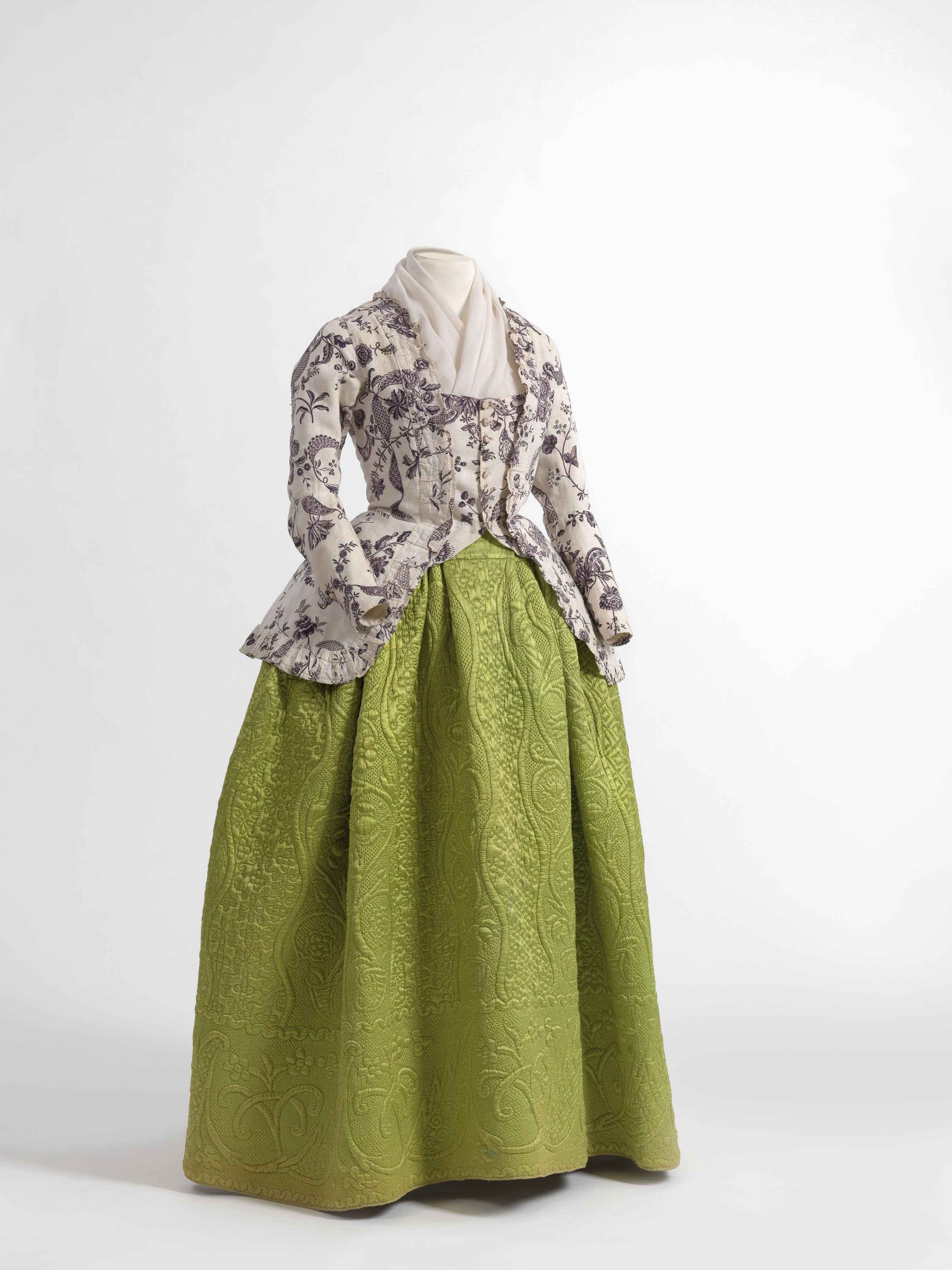
Quilted skirt (silk, wool and cotton – 1770–1790), Jacoba de Jonge-collection MoMu, Antwerp / Photo by Hugo Maertens, Bruges

Quilting is the process of joining a minimum of three layers of fabric together either through stitching manually using a needle and thread, or mechanically with a sewing machine or specialised longarm quilting system. An array of stitches is passed through all layers of the fabric to create a three-dimensional padded surface. The three layers are typically referred to as the top fabric or quilt top, batting or insulating material, and the backing.

Quilting varies from a purely functional fabric joinery technique to highly elaborate, decorative three dimensional surface treatments. A wide variety of textile products are traditionally associated with quilting, including bed coverings, home furnishings, garments and costumes, wall hangings, artistic objects, and cultural artifacts.

A quilter can employ a wide range of effects that contribute to the quality and utility of the final quilted material. To create these effects, the quilter manipulates elements such as material type and thickness, stitch length and style, pattern design, piecing, and cutting. Two-dimensional effects such as optical illusions can be achieved through aesthetic choices regarding colour, texture, and print. Three-dimensional and sculptural components of quilted material can be manipulated and enhanced further by embellishment, which may include appliqué, embroidery techniques such as shisha mirror work, and the inclusion of other objects or elements such as pearls, beads, buttons, and sequins. Some quilters create or dye their own fabrics. In contemporary artistic quilting, quilters sometimes use new and experimental materials such as plastics, paper, natural fibers, and plants.

Quilting can be considered one of the first examples of upcycling, as quilters have historically made extensive use of remnants and offcuts for the creation of new products.

== History ==
=== Early quilting ===
The origin of the term 'quilt' is linked to the Latin word culcita, meaning a bolster, cushion, or stuffed sack. The word came into the English language from the French word cuilte. The first use of the term seems to have been in England in the 13th century.

The sewing techniques of piecing, appliqué, and quilting have been used to create clothing and furnishings in various parts of the world for several millennia, and a wide range of unique quilting styles and techniques have evolved around the globe.

The earliest known quilted garment is depicted on the carved ivory figure of a Pharaoh dating from the ancient Egyptian First Dynasty. In 1924 archaeologists discovered a quilted floor covering in Mongolia, estimated to date between 100 BC and 200 AD.

In Europe, quilting has been part of the needlework tradition since about the fifth century. Early objects contained Egyptian cotton, which may indicate that Egyptian and Mediterranean trade provided a conduit for the technique. However, quilted objects were relatively rare in Europe until approximately the twelfth century, when quilted bedding and other items appeared after the return of the Crusaders from the Middle East. The medieval quilted gambeson, aketon and arming doublet were garments worn under or instead of chain mail or plate armor. These later developed into the quilted doublet worn as part of European male clothing from the fourteenth to seventeenth century. The earliest known surviving European bed quilt is the Tristan quilt, which was made in late-fourteenth century Italy from linen padded with wool. The blocks across its center are scenes from the legend of Tristan. The quilt is 320 × 287 cm (126 × 113 in) and is in the Victoria and Albert Museum in London.

=== American quilts ===
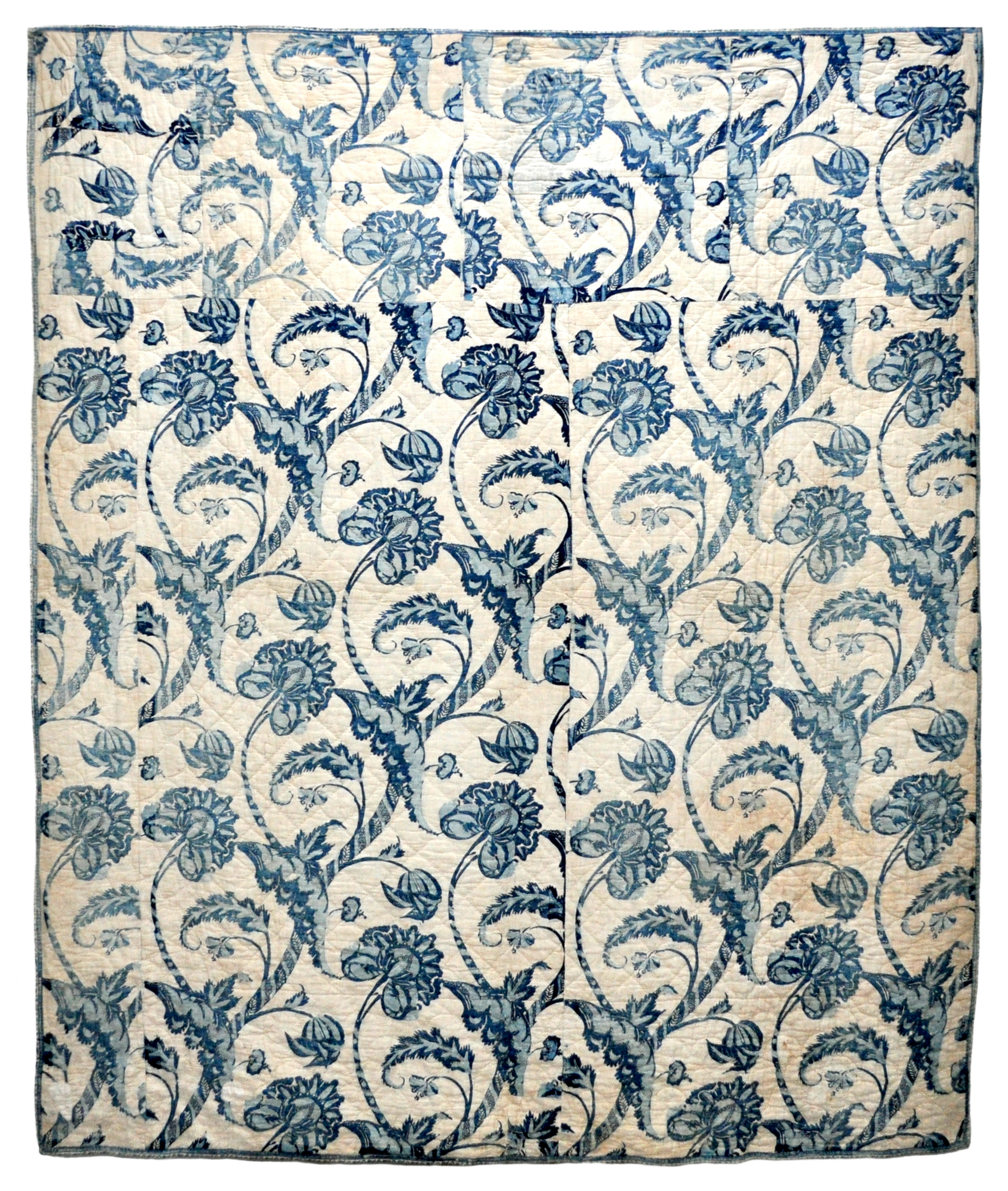
This early American wholecloth quilt was made in the Colonial period, c. 1760–1800. The blue resist fabric includes bold, fanciful botanical motifs. Collection of Bill Volckening.

In American Colonial times, quilts were predominantly whole-cloth quilts—a single piece of fabric layered with batting and backing held together with fine needlework quilting. Broderie perse quilts were popular during this time and the majority of pierced or appliqued quilts made during the 1770–1800 period were medallion-style quilts (quilts with a central ornamental panel and one or more borders). Patchwork quilting in America dates to the 1770s, the decade the United States gained its independence from England. These late-eighteenth- and nineteenth-century patchwork quilts often mixed wool, silk, linen, and cotton in the same piece, as well as mixing large-scale (often chintz) and small-scale (often calico) patterns. In North America, some worn-out blankets were utilized to create a new quilt from worn-out clothes, and in these quilts the internal batting layer was made up of old blankets or older quilts.

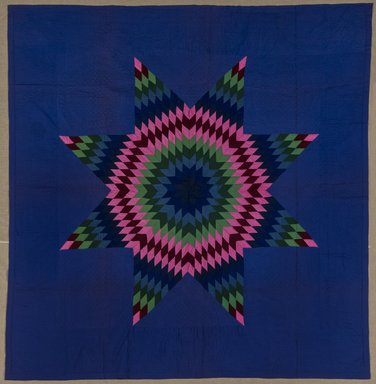
Star of Bethlehem Quilt, 1940 from the Brooklyn Museum

During American pioneer days, foundation piecing became popular. Paper was cut into shapes and used as a pattern; each individual piece of cut fabric was basted around the paper pattern. Paper was a scarce commodity in the early American west so women would save letters from home, postcards, newspaper clippings, and catalogs to use as patterns. The paper not only served as a pattern but as an insulator. Paper found between these old quilts has become a primary source of information about pioneer life.

Quilts made without any insulation or batting were referred to as summer quilts. They were not made for warmth, but to keep the chill off during cooler summer evenings.

==== African-American quilts ====
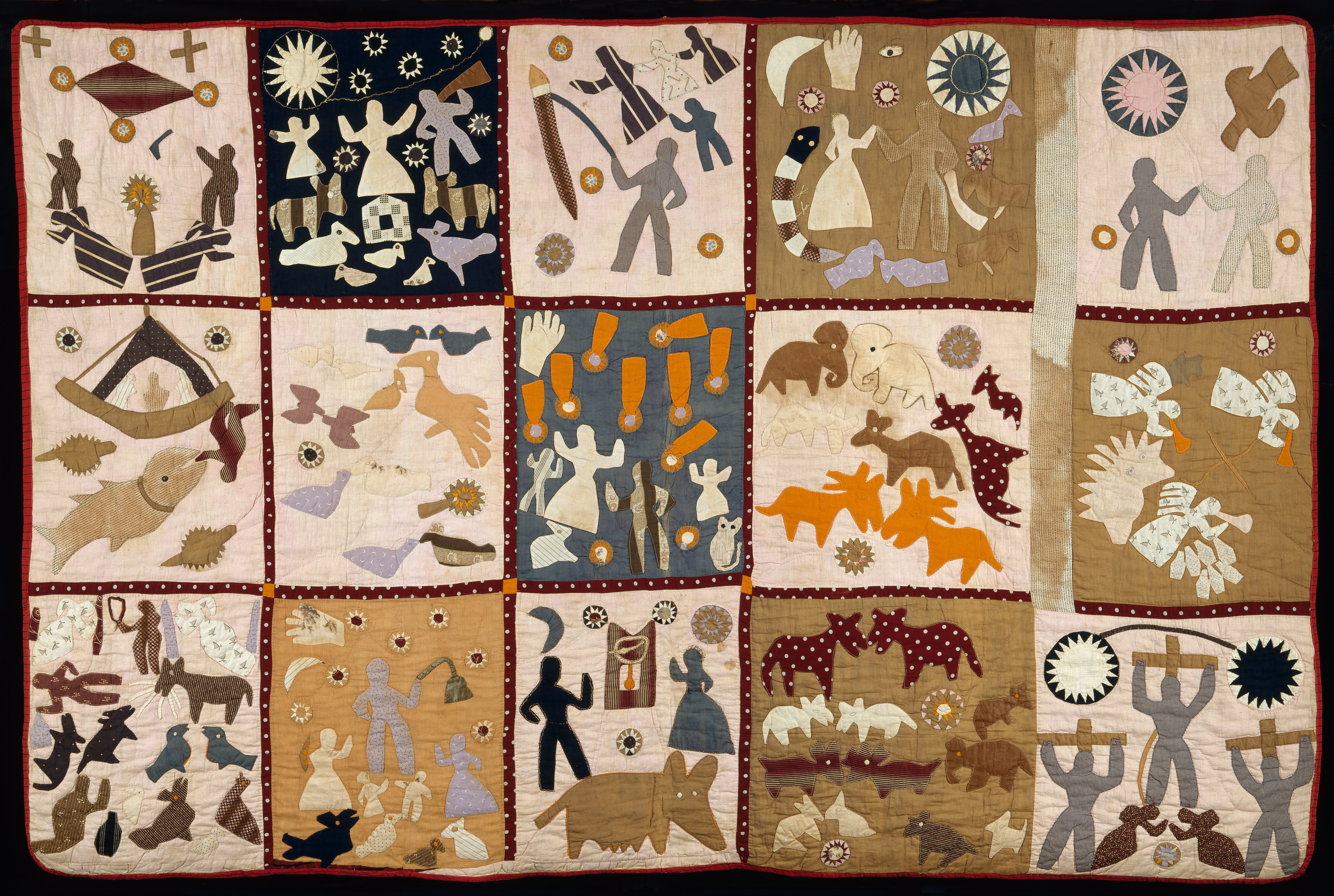
Pictorial Quilt by Harriet Powers c. 1895–98. The quilt is divided into 15 different pictorial images made with pieces of cotton.

There is a long tradition of African-American quilting beginning with quilts made by enslaved Africans, both for themselves and for the people who enslaved them. The style of these quilts was determined largely by time period and region, rather than race, and the documented slave-made quilts generally resemble those made by white women in their region. After 1865 and the end of slavery in the United States, African-Americans began to develop their own distinctive style of quilting. Harriet Powers, an African American woman born into slavery, made two famous "story quilts" and was one of the many African-American quilters who contributed to the development of quilting in the United States. This style of African-American quilts was categorized by its bright colors, organization in a strip arrangement, and asymmetrical patterns.

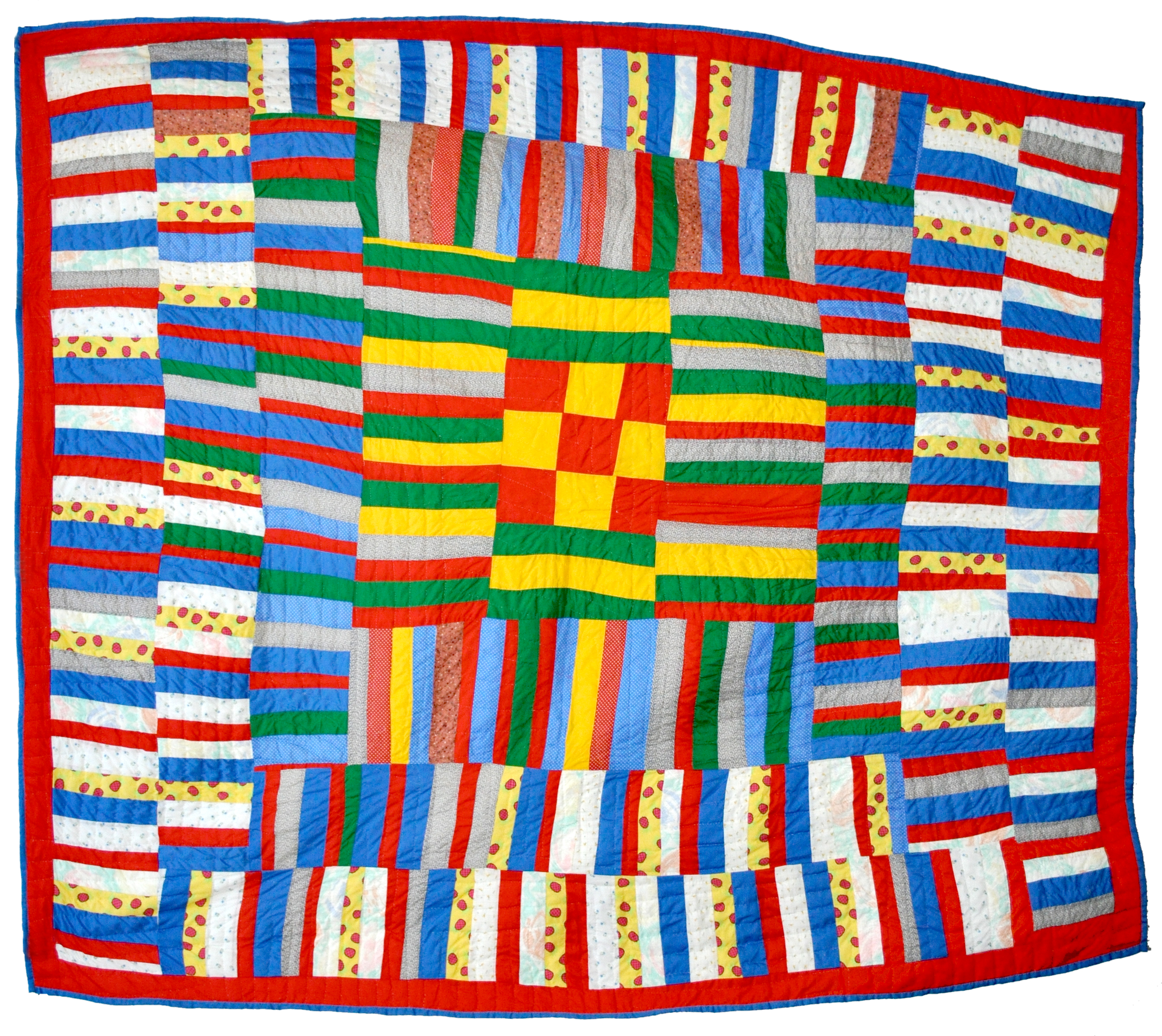
Quilt by Lucy Mingo c. 1979

The first nationwide recognition of African-American quilt-making came when the Gee's Bend quilting community of Alabama was celebrated in an exhibition that opened in 2002 and traveled to many museums, including the Smithsonian. Gee's Bend is a small, isolated community of African-Americans in southern Alabama with a quilt-making tradition that goes back several generations and is characterized by pattern improvisation, multiple patterning, bright and contrasting colors, visual motion, and a lack of rules. The contributions made by Harriet Powers and other quilters of Gee's Bend, Alabama have been recognized by the US Postal Service with a series of stamps. Many of the quilters of Gee's Bend also participated in the Freedom Quilting Bee. A quilting co-op created by some of the African American women of Wilcox County, Alabama. Some of the founding and influential members include Estelle Witherspoon, Willie Abrams, Lucy Mingo, Minder Pettway Coleman, and Aolar Mosely. The communal nature of the quilting process (and how it can bring together women of varied races and backgrounds) was honored in the series of stamps. Themes of community and storytelling are common themes in African-American quilts.

Beginning with the children's story Sweet Clara and the Freedom Quilt (1989), a legend has developed that enslaved people used quilts as a means to share and transmit secret messages to escape slavery and travel the Underground Railroad. Consensus among historians is that there is no sound basis for this belief, and no documented mention among the thousands of slave narratives or other contemporary records.

Contemporary quilters such as Faith Ringgold utilize quilt making to tell stories and make political statements about the African-American experience. Ringgold, originally a painter, began quilting in order to stray away from Western art practices. Her famous "story quilts" utilize mixed media, painting, and quilting. One of her most famous quilts, Tar Beach 2 (1990), depicts the story of a young African-American girl flying around Harlem in New York City.

Bisa Butler, another modern African-American quilter, celebrates Black life with her vibrant, quilted portraits of both everyday people and notable historical figures. Her quilts are now preserved in the permanent collections at the National Museum of African American History and Culture, the Art Institute of Chicago, and about a dozen other art museums.

==== Amish quilts ====
Three examples of Lancaster Amish Quilts

Another American group to develop a distinct style of quilting were the Amish. Typically, these quilts use only solid fabrics, are pieced from geometric shapes, do not contain appliqué, and construction is simple (corners are butted, rather than mitered, for instance) and done entirely by hand. Amish quilters also tend to use simple patterns: Lancaster County Amish are known for their Diamond-in-a-Square and Bars patterns, while other communities use patterns such as Brick, Streak of Lightning, Chinese Coins, and Log Cabins, and midwestern communities are known for their repeating block patterns. Borders and color choice also vary by community. For example, Lancaster quilts feature wide borders with lavish quilting. Midwestern quilts feature narrower borders to balance the fancier piecing.

==== Native American quilts ====
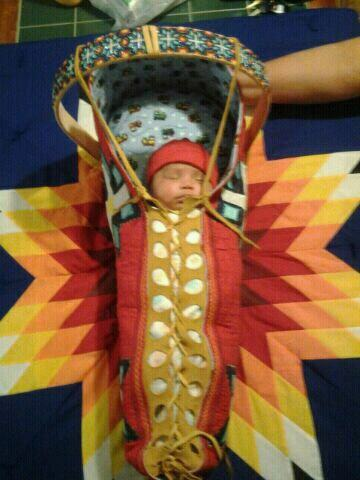
Native American baby in cradle board with baby star quilt

Some Native Americans are thought to have learned quilting through observation of white settlers; others learned it from missionaries who taught quilting to Native American women along with other homemaking skills. Native American women quickly developed their own unique style, the Lone Star design (also called the Star of Bethlehem), a variation on Morning Star designs that had been featured on Native American clothing and other items for centuries. These quilts often featured floral appliqué framing the star design. Star quilts have become an important part of many Plains Indian ceremonies, replacing buffalo robes traditionally given away at births, marriages, tribal elections, and other ceremonies. Pictorial quilts, created with appliqué, were also common.

Another distinctive style of Native American quilting is Seminole piecing, created by Seminoles living in the Florida Everglades. The style evolved out of a need for cloth (the closest town was often a week's journey away). Women would make strips of sewing the remnants of fabric rolls together, then sew these into larger pieces to make clothing. Eventually the style began to be used not just for clothing but for quilts as well. In 1900, with the introduction of sewing machines and readily available fabric in Seminole communities, the patterns became much more elaborate and the style continues to be in use today, both by Seminole women and by others who have copied and adapted their designs and techniques.

==== Hawaiian quilting ====
"Hawaiian quilting was well established by the beginning of the twentieth century. Hawaiian women learned to quilt from the wives of missionaries from New England in the 1820s. Though they learned both pieced work and applique, by the 1870s they had adapted applique techniques to create a uniquely Hawaiian mode of expression. The classic Hawaiian quilt design is a large, bold, curvilinear appliqué pattern that covers much of the surface of the quilt, with the symmetrical design cut from only one piece of fabric."

=== South Asian quilting ===
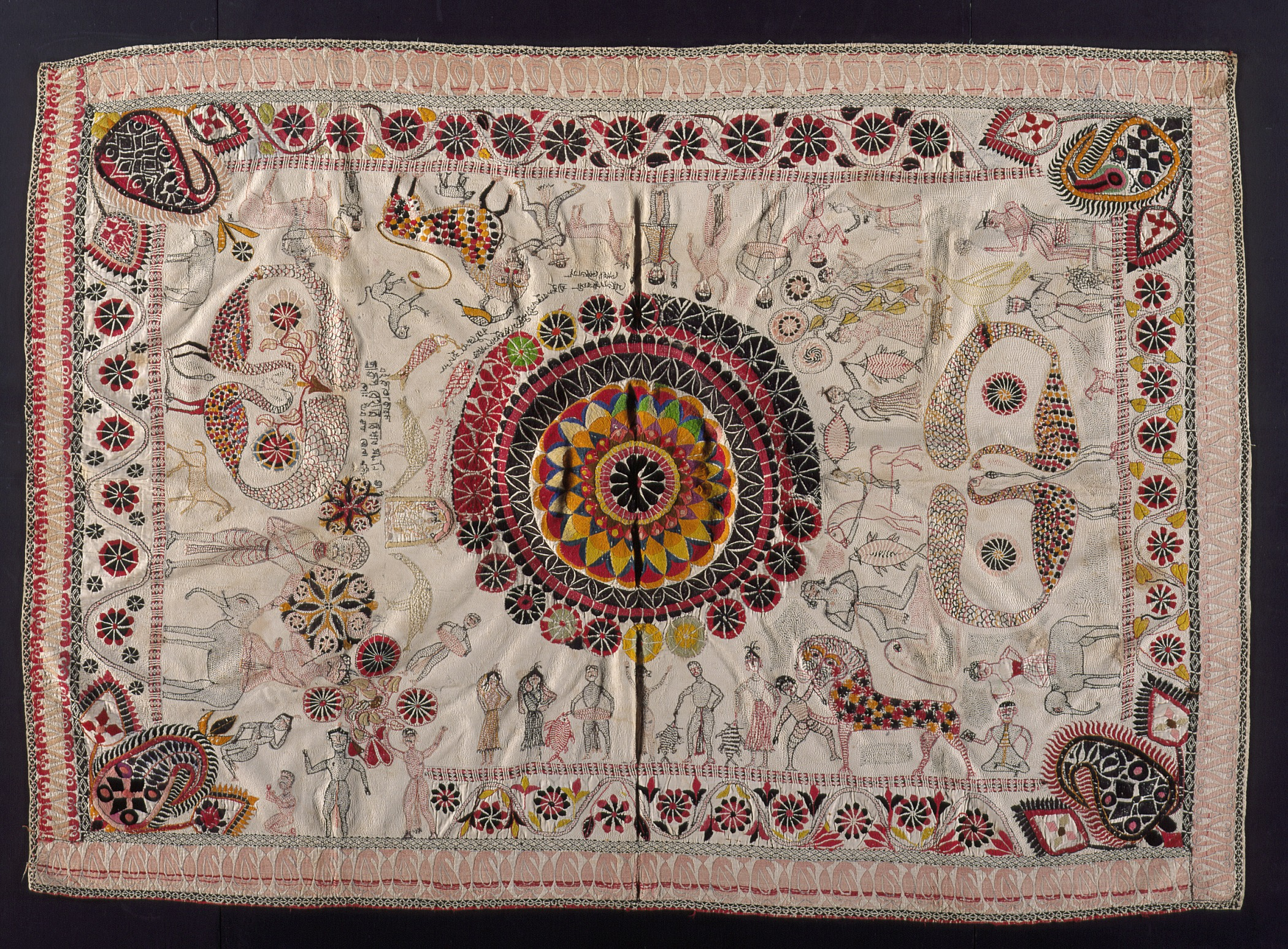
East Bengal (Modern Bangladesh), 19th century

There are two primary forms of quilting that originate in South Asia: Nakshi Kantha and Ralli. Nakshi Kantha quilts originated in India and are typically made of scraps and worn-out fabric stitched together with old sari threads using kantha embroidery stitches. "The layers of cloth were spread on the ground, held in place with weights at the edges, and sewn together with rows of large basting stitches. The cloth was then folded and worked on whenever there was time." The first recorded kantha are more than 500 years old.

Ralli quilts are traditionally made in Pakistan, western India, and the surrounding area. They are made by every sector of society including Hindu and Muslim women, women of different castes, and women from different towns or villages or tribes with the colors and designs varying among these groups. The name comes from ralanna, a word meaning to mix or connect. Quilts tops were designed and pieced by one woman using scraps of hand-dyed cotton. This cotton often comes from old dresses or shawls. Once pieced, the quilt top is placed on a reed mat with the other layers and sewn together using thick, colored thread in straight parallel lines by members of the designer's family and community.

=== East Asian quilting ===
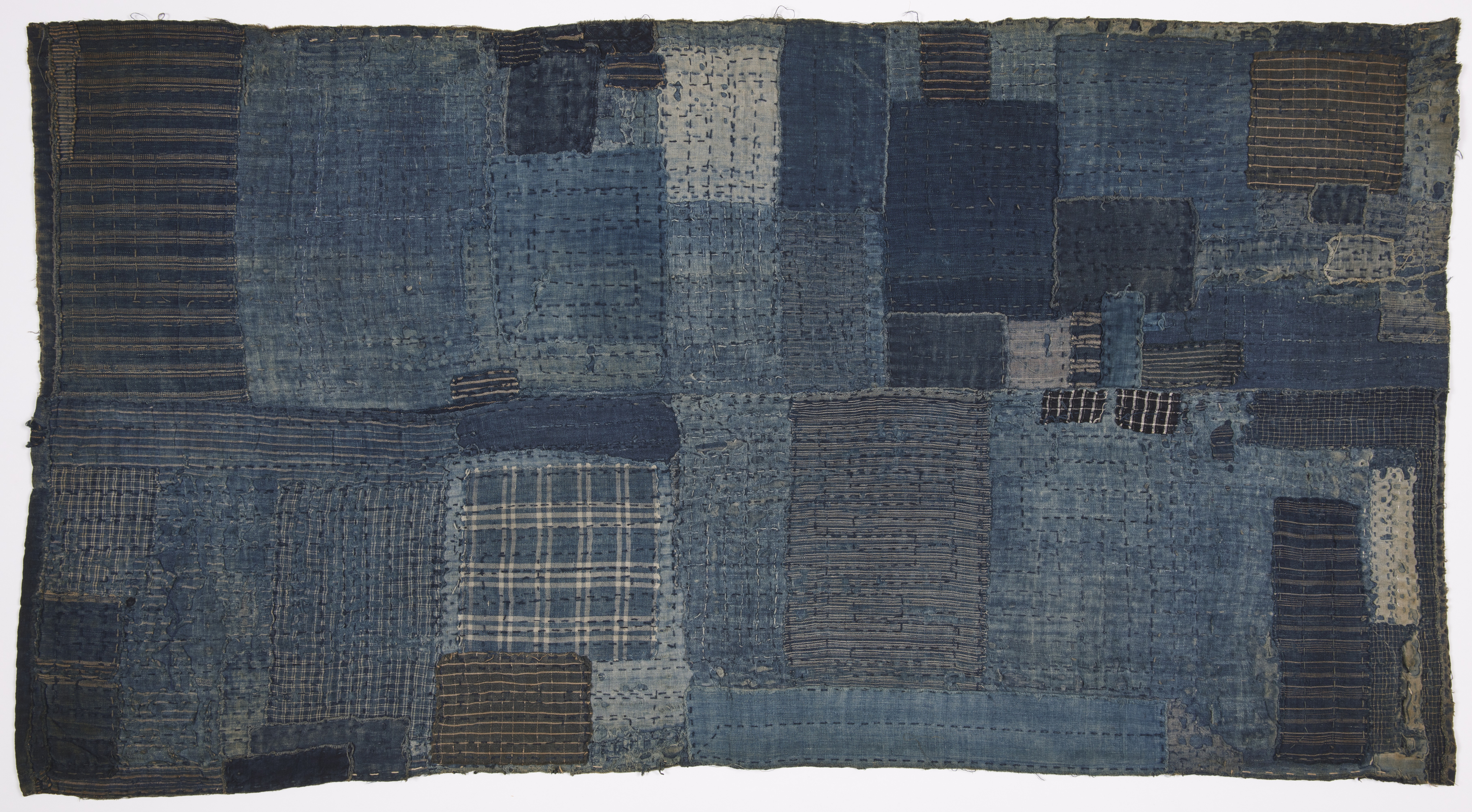
Child's futon sleeping mat (boro shikimono), late 1800s Japan. The stitches are decorative, but also functional; they hold the pieced cotton rags together.

Quilting in Japan, until the 20th century, generally covered local bast fibers with more valuable cotton cloth. The rectangular nature of Japanese cloth articles encouraged rectangle-based patterns. Sashiko stitching has now also developed purely decorative forms.

=== Swedish quilting ===
Quilting originated in Sweden in the fifteenth century with heavily stitched and appliquéd quilts made for the very wealthy. These quilts, created from silk, wool, and felt, were intended to be both decorative and functional and were found in churches and in the homes of nobility. Imported cotton first appeared in Sweden in 1870, and began to appear in Swedish quilts soon after along with scraps of wool, silk, and linen. As the availability of cotton increased and its price went down, quilting became widespread among all classes of Swedish society. Wealthier quilters used wool batting while others used linen scraps, rags, or paper mixed with animal hair. In general, these quilts were simple and narrow, made by both men and women. The biggest influence on Swedish quilting in this time period is thought to have come from America as Swedish immigrants to the United States returned to their home country when conditions there improved.

=== Art quilting ===
During the late 20th century, art quilts became popular for their aesthetic and artistic qualities rather than for functionality; these quilts may be displayed on a wall or table instead of being used on a bed. "It is believed that decorative quilting came to Europe and Asia during the Crusades (1100–1300 AD), a likely idea because textile arts were more developed in China and India than in the West."

American artist Judy Chicago stated in a 1981 interview that were it not for sexism in the visual arts, the art world, and broader society, quilting would be more widely regarded as a form of high art:

Abstract patterns by men are "art"; abstract patterns by women in fabric are "decorative"; they're called quilts. So there's all these kind of double standards and all these kind of words that prevent women's experience from entering—even when they express it—from entering the mainstream of art.

=== Modern quilting ===
In the early 21st century, modern quilting became a more prominent area of quilting. Modern quilting follows a distinct aesthetic style which draws on inspiration from modern style in architecture, art, and design using traditional quilt making techniques. Modern quilts are different from art quilts in that they are made to be used. Modern quilts are also influenced by the Quilters of Gee's Bend, Amish quilts, Nancy Crow, Denyse Schmidt, Gwen Marston, Yoshiko Jinzenji, Bill Kerr and Weeks Ringle.

The Modern Quilt Guild has attempted to define modern quilting. The characteristics of a modern quilt may include: the use of bold colors and prints, high contrast and graphic areas of solid color, improvisational piecing, minimalism, expansive negative space, and alternate grid work.

The Modern Quilt Guild, a non-profit corporation, with 14,000 members in more than 200 members guilds in 39 countries, fosters modern quilting via local guilds, workshops, webinars, and Quiltcon—an annual modern quilting conference and convention. The founding Modern Quilt Guild formed in October 2009 in Los Angeles.

QuiltCon features a quilt show with 400+ quilts, quilt vendors, lectures, and quilting workshops and classes. The first QuiltCon was February 21–24, 2013, in Austin, Texas. QuiltCon 2020 was held in Austin, Texas, February 20–23, 2020, and featured 400 juried modern quilts from quilters around the world.

=== Quilt blocks ===
The quilt block is traditionally a sub-unit composed of several pieces of fabric sewn together. The quilt blocks are repeated, or sometimes alternated with plain blocks, to form the overall design of a quilt. Barbara Brackman has documented over 4000 different quilt block patterns from the early 1830s to the 1970s in the Encyclopedia Of Pieced Quilt Patterns. Some of the simpler designs for quilt blocks include the Nine-Patch, Shoo Fly, Churn Dash, and the Prairie Queen.

Most geometric quilt block designs fit into a "grid", which is the number of squares a pattern block is divided into. The five categories into which most square patterns fall are Four Patch, Nine Patch, Five-Patch, Seven-Patch, and Eight-Pointed Star. Each block can be subdivided into multiples: a Four-Patch can be constructed of 16 or 64 squares, for example.

A simple Nine Patch is made by sewing five patterned or dark pieces (patches) to four light square pieces in alternating order. These nine sewn squares make one block.

The Shoo Fly varies from this Nine Patch by dividing each of the four corner pieces into a light and dark triangle.

Another variation develops when one square piece is divided into two equal rectangles in the basic Nine Patch design. The Churn Dash block combines the triangles and rectangle to expand the Nine Patch.

The Prairie Queen block combines two large scale triangles in the corner section with the middle section using four squares. The center piece is one full size square. Each of the nine sections does have the same overall measurement and fits together.

The number of patterns possible by subdividing Four-, Five-, Seven-, Nine-Patches and Eight-Pointed Stars and using triangles instead of squares in the small subdivisions is almost endless.

== Quilting techniques ==
Many types of quilting exist today. The two most widely used are hand-quilting and machine quilting.

Hand quilting is the process of using a needle and thread to sew a running stitch by hand across the entire area to be quilted. This binds the layers together. A quilting frame or hoop is often used to assist in holding the piece being quilted off the quilter's lap. A quilter can make one stitch at a time by first driving the needle through the fabric from the right side, then pushing it back up through the material from the wrong side to complete the stitch; this is called a stab stitch. Another option is called a rocking stitch, where the quilter has one hand, usually with a finger wearing a thimble, on top of the quilt, while the other hand is located beneath the piece to push the needle back up. A third option is called "loading the needle" and involves doing four or more stitches before pulling the needle through the cloth. Hand quilting is still practiced by the Amish and Mennonites within the United States and Canada, and is enjoying a resurgence worldwide.

Quilting machine in Haikou, Hainan, China

Machine quilting is the process of using a home sewing machine or a longarm machine to sew the layers together. With the home sewing machine, the layers are tacked together before quilting. This involves laying the top, batting, and backing out on a flat surface and either pinning (using large safety pins) or tacking the layers together. Longarm quilting involves placing the layers to be quilted on a special frame. The frame has bars on which the layers are rolled, keeping these together without the need for tacking or pinning. These frames are used with a professional sewing machine mounted on a platform. The platform rides along tracks so that the machine can be moved across the layers on the frame. A longarm machine is moved across the fabric. In contrast, the fabric is moved through a home sewing machine.

Tying is another technique of fastening the three layers together. This is done primarily on quilts that are made to be used and are needed quickly. The process of tying the quilt is done with yarns or multiple strands of thread. Square knots are used to finish off the ties so that the quilt may be washed and used without fear of the knots coming undone. This technique is commonly called "tacking". In the Midwest, tacked bed covers are referred to as comforters.

Quilting is now taught in some American schools. It is also taught at senior centers around the U.S., but quilters of all ages attend classes. These forms of workshops or classes are also available in other countries in guilds and community colleges.

=== Quilting tools ===
Contemporary quilters use a wide range of quilting designs and styles, from ancient and ethnic to post-modern futuristic patterns. There is no one single school or style that dominates the quilt-making world.

Sewing machines can be used in the process of piecing together a quilt top. Some quilters also use a home sewing machine for quilting together the layers of the quilt, as well as binding the final product. While most home sewing machines can be used to quilt layers together, having a wide throat (the space to the right of the needle mechanism) is useful to manipulate a bulky quilt through the machine when the throat is both high and long.

Fabric markers can be used to mark where cuts should be made in the fabric. Marks from specialist fabric marker wash out of fabrics.

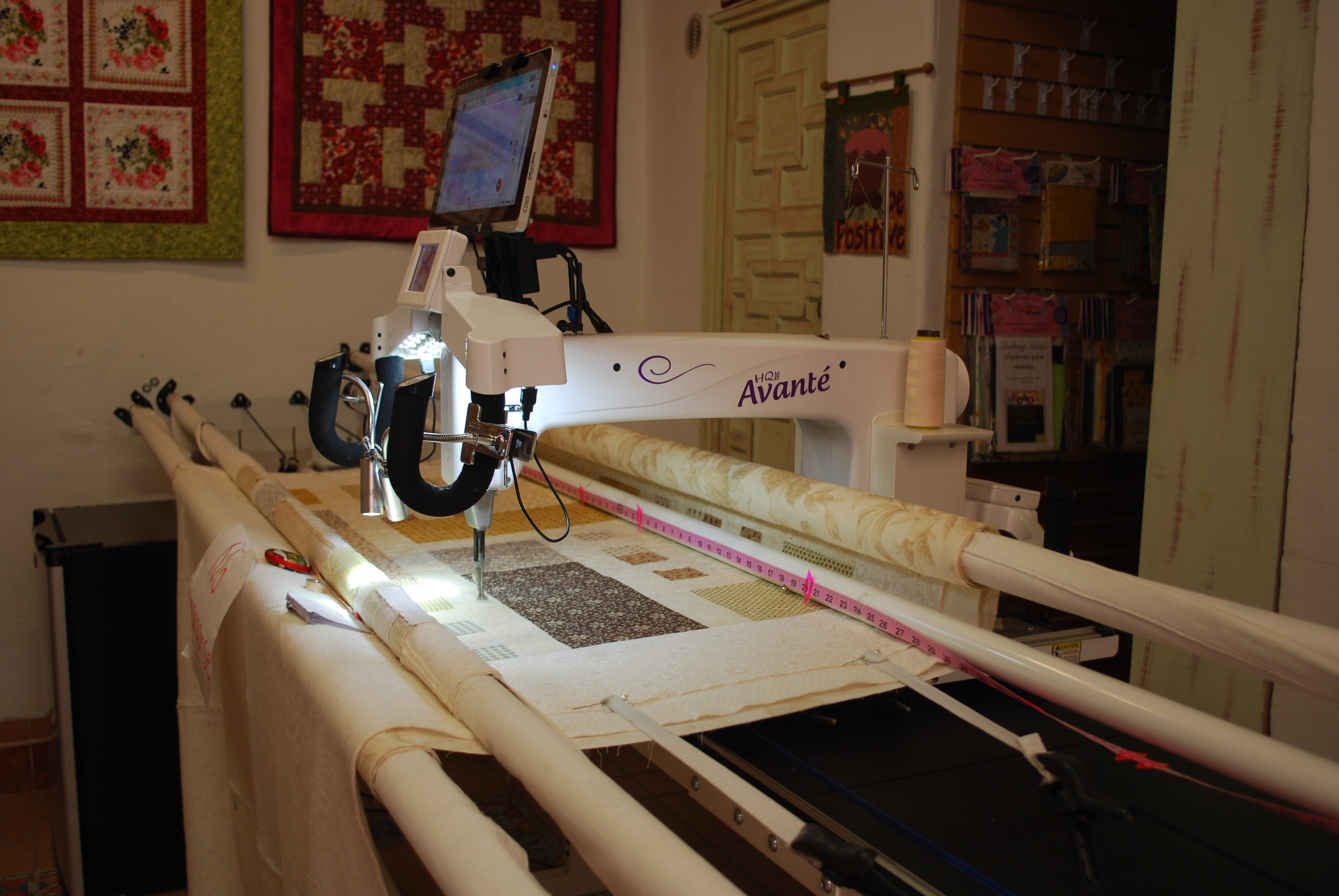
Longarm quilting machine

Quilting rulers are usually square or rectangular measuring instruments with length measurement and degree angle markings along multiple edges.

Longarm quilting machines can be used to make larger quilts. Larger machines can be leveraged so that the quilter does not have to hold the fabric. Some specialist quilt shops offer longarm services.

Machine quilting needles are very sharp in order to readily pierce layers of quilt and properly sew together the quilt top, batting and backing.

Hand quilting needles are traditionally called betweens and are generally smaller and stronger than normal sewing needles. They have a very small eye which prevents any extra bump at the head of the needles when you are pulling through the thread.

Pins can be used in many different combinations to achieve similar results.

Thimbles provide protection to fingertips.

Specialist quilting threads come in many types, including different weights of thread and different materials. Cotton, polyester, and nylon threads are used in different forms of quilting.

Rotary cutters revolutionized quilt-making when they appeared in the late 1970s. Rotary cutters simplify the process of cutting even slices of fabric.

Basting spray is a temporary aerosol glue that can be used to spray the layers of a quilt together, so it stays in place whilst being sewn. It is a specially formulated glue that will not clog a sewing machine, and is a much quicker basting method than hand basting.

Quilting templates/patterns come in many varieties and are generally considered the basis of the structure of the quilt, like a blueprint for a house.

Bias binding or bias tape can be made from strips of quilt fabric or purchased as quilt binding. It is used in the last stage of making a quilt, and is a method of covering the edges of the quilt.

== Specialty styles ==
- Foundation piecing – also known as paper-piecing – sewing pieces of fabric onto a temporary or permanent foundation
- Shadow or echo quilting – Hawaiian quilting, where quilting is done around an appliquéd piece on the quilt top, then the quilting is echoed again and again around the previous quilting line.
- Ralli quilting – Pakistani and Indian quilting, often associated with the Sindh (Pakistan) and Gujarat (India) regions.
- Sashiko stitching – Basic running stitch worked in heavy, white cotton thread usually on dark indigo colored fabric. It was originally used by the working classes to stitch layers together for warmth.
- Trapunto quilting – stuffed quilting, often associated with Italy.
- Machine trapunto quilting – a process of using water-soluble thread and an extra layer of batting to achieve trapunto design and then sandwiching the quilt and re-sewing the design with regular cotton thread.
- Shadow trapunto – This involves quilting a design in fine lawn and filling some of the spaces in the pattern with small lengths of colored wool.
- Tivaevae or tifaifai – A distinct art from the Cook Islands.
- Watercolor quilting – A sophisticated form of scrap quilting whereby uniform sizes of various prints are arranged and sewn to create a picture or design. See also Colorwash.
- Thread art – A custom style of sewing where thread is layered to create the picture on the quilt.
- Traditional embroidery techniques can also be used to create block designs or embellish pieced or appliqued blocks.

== See also ==
- Broderie perse
- Godadi
- Kantha
- Quilt art
- Razai
- Ralli quilt
- Sashiko
