= Narrative quilting =

Textile-art storytelling

American Map Quilt, created in Virginia, 1886 (Utah Museum of Fine Arts)

Narrative quilting describes the use of blanket weaving and quilting to portray a message or tell a story. It was a means of sending messages and recording history for women that were unable to participate in politics throughout time.

== Background ==
Quilting came to America from Europe with the colonists, where there was a long-standing history of quilting. Quilting did not gain great momentum until after the Revolutionary War when women with lots of time and money began to use quilting as an art form. These quilts were not meant for typical use but instead were status symbols. Class differences contribute to much of the diversity in quilting styles. Quilts were meant to be sentimental and symbolic. From 1920-1930 there was a new-found desire to make quilts, generating the boom in narrative quilts found in exhibitions today.

== Abolitionist quilts ==
Abolitionist quilting was a way that women, particularly those within the Quaker church, were able to express political views without having the right to vote or a means to be politically involved. These women were opposed to slavery, and began to get more involved in the 1830s. Organized fundraising fairs and selling abolitionist quilts was one popular way for women to support the anti-slavery cause. Lydia Maria Child created one notable quilt called the eight-pointed star crib quilt. This quilt had a poem written by Elizabeth Margaret Chandler in the center as a reminder to think of the child of a slave mother who was "torn from her." Abolitionist quilts are rare but some are preserved in museums today.

== Underground Railroad ==
A legend describes quilts being hung on clotheslines outside of safe houses along the Underground Railroad in the 1830s. Embedded within the quilts was a code describing where to go next. The myth explains the symbols used, such as the Bow Tie, the Bear Paw, or the Log Cabin designs. The bow-tie design was meant to say that those passing should dress in a disguise to appear higher status. The bear paw symbolized following the animal trails up to the mountains for food and water. And the log cabin meant to seek shelter here this is a safe place to stay. The Drunkard's Path was meant to say zig-zag as you come along this path, in case you are being stalked by hounds. And the Double Wedding Ring pattern is suggested to mean it is now safe to remove your chains and shackles. Although this concept is debated among historians, many people associate this quilting myth with narrative quilting due to the theorized content and story these quilts held.

== Bible Quilt ==
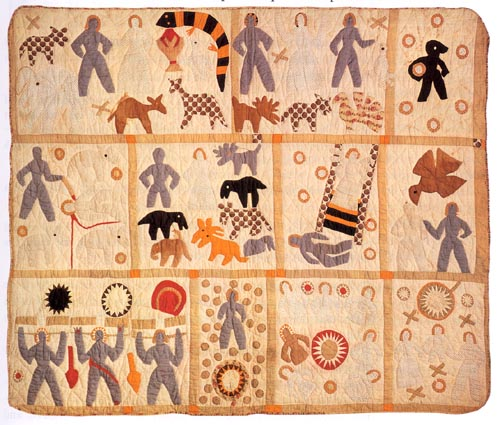
Harriet Powers' Bible Quilt, 1886

Harriet Powers, an African-American farm woman of Clarke County, Georgia, is well-known for her quilts of the 1880s best exemplified by a quilt known as the Bible Quilt.

Created around 1885–1886, the quilt features 11 panels stitched by both hand and machine in a previously unseen pattern, with a border and intersecting lines framing each scene. Every panel depicts a biblical narrative — the first six drawn from the Old Testament, beginning with Adam and Eve in the Garden of Eden and moving through Eve and her son in Paradise, Satan and the seven stars, the death of Abel at Cain's hand, Cain's journey to the land of Nod, and Jacob's dream. The final five panels turn to the New Testament, tracing the life of Jesus Christ through his baptism, the Last Supper, the crucifixion, the Holy Family, and Judas Iscariot's betrayal for thirty pieces of silver.

== Rites of passage quilts ==
In the 1970s as quilting began to a popular resurgence quilt-making served as public acknowledgement of rites of passage. Presentation quilts were meant to celebrate a given event such as an engagement, or a family moving away. Album quilts similarly were meant to remember an event. Album quilts received their name because the quilting blocks looked like pages combined into a quilt. Each block designed by friends and family and sewn together to make one quilt. Friendship and gratitude could also be expressed through such album quilts. Freedom quilts were a colonial artifact given to young men on their 21st birthday to celebrate coming of age. These quilts were designed with bright patriotic colors and were often stored in their hope chest until the day of marriage. Tradition also showed women typically were to make 12 quilts prior to engagement and the 13th would be made by friends and family as a sign that the wedding was soon to occur. The 13th quilt was called the bride quilt and often had whimsical designs and well wishes from friends. Each of these quilts designated for a certain time in a person's life shared a message and held specific memories.

== Faith Ringgold ==
Faith Ringgold is an artist famous for her use of narrative quilts who describes her work as "intended to make...a statement about the civil rights movement and what was happening to black people at that time, and to make it super-real.”

== Native American star quilts ==
Weaving clothing and blankets was common among many of the American Indian tribes, especially the Navajo. Patterns would be woven into blankets and rugs, oftentimes with some form of significance. However, as more European and American settlers began moving west, efforts were made to "civilize" the Indians. Quilting was thus adopted into the American Indian way of life, initially through school systems and sewing circles. However, quilting quickly became another expression of the culture of the American Indians. One of the most important quilt patterns that was seen throughout the American Indian communities was the Star Quilt. It had both common, utilitarian purposes, as well as ceremonial purposes. They also became very important to the economy of the reservation.

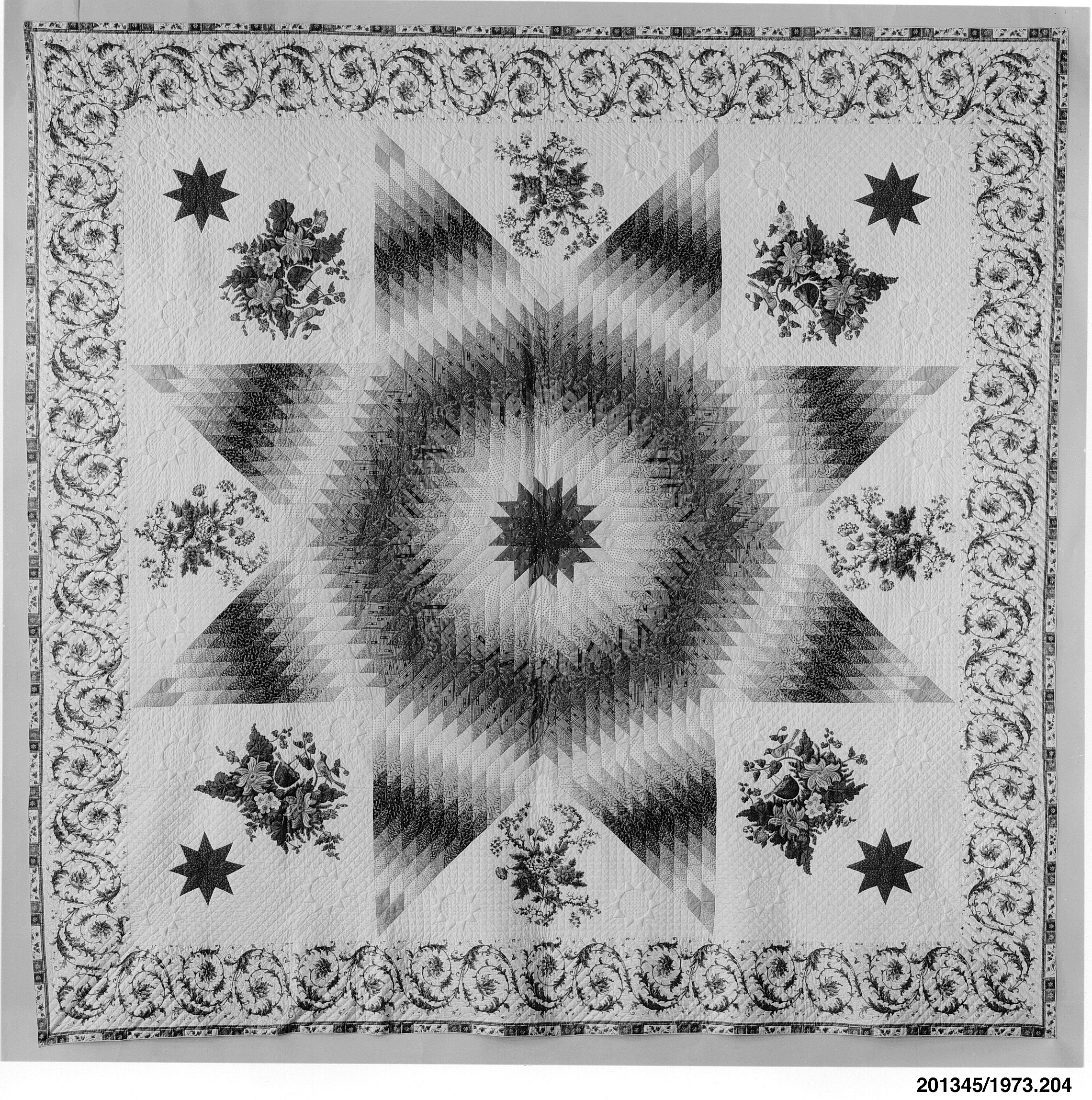
Star of Bethlehem Quilt

The Star Quilt pattern in quilting is an eight-pointed star. It has had many names throughout history, including the Morning Star, the Star of Bethlehem, the Lone Star, the Star of the East, the Mathematical Star, and more. This pattern was widely adopted and used throughout Indian communities, and became a symbol of their cultural identity. However, the Star pattern isn't exclusively used by Native quilters, it is also widely used throughout the non-Native quilting community.

=== Significance ===
The Star Quilt pattern is similar in color and design to the geometric paintings that could be found on nineteenth century hide robes. One such design of robes was called the War Bonnet design and involved diamonds spreading outward in increasingly larger circles. Although not identical, this War Bonnet design is similar to the Star Quilt pattern, and could be one of the reasons the quilt pattern became so popular. Modern day American Indian quilters have found ways to incorporate more of their culture into the Star Quilts. One way that they do this is by adding symbols, such as an eagle, to the center part of the star. By adding these significant details to the quilt, a record is being made of the culture. The quilt changes from just a simple pattern with some significance, to an emblem of tradition and culture. Images from popular culture can also be added to the center of the star, however that does not add to the cultural significance of the quilt.

In the modern day Star Quilts are used in both traditional cultural ceremonies as well as Christian churches. One example of a use for the Star Quilt is at funerals. The coffin is generally covered by at least one Star Quilt. The quilt is, on occasion, put in the coffin and buried with the deceased. Another use of the Star Quilts in the modern day is in trade. Star Quilts can be traded for necessities such as food and diapers. A more traditional cultural use for the Star Quilt is in ceremonies. The quilts are needed for baptisms, bonnet ceremonies, and healing ceremonies, also known as Yuwipi where the medicine man is wrapped in the Star Quilt.

== See also ==
- Navajo weaving

== Sources ==
- World Quilts: The American Story. (n.d.). Abolition: World quilts: The American story. Accessed 22 March, 2023.
- Brown, Elsa Barkley "African-American Women's Quilting". Signs 14, no. 4 (1989): 921-29.
- Cash, Floris Barnett "Kinship and Quilting: An Explanation of an African-American Tradition". The Journal of Negro History 80, no. 1 (1995): 30-41
- Hafter, Daryl M. “Toward a Social History of Needlework Artists.” Woman's Art Journal 2, no. 2 (1981): 25–29.doi:10.2307/1357978.
- Hans, Birgit. “The Star Quilt on the Northern Plains: A Symbol of American Indian Identity.” Bismarck: North Dakota, 2012
- Hanson, Debra. “Faith Ringgold: Paintings and Story Quilts, 1964–2017.” Panorama, November 8, 2022
- Hoffman, W. J. “Native American Blanket-Making.” The Monthly Illustrator 4, no. 12 (1895): 114–19. doi:10.2307/25582011
- Klassen, Teri. “Representations of African American Quiltmaking: From Omission to High Art.” The Journal of American Folklore 122, no. 485 (2009): 297–334.
- McIntosh, Phyllis. “Quilting: An American Craft.” ERIC, 2006.
- National Museum of American History. “1885 - 1886 Harriet Powers's Bible Quilt.” 1885-1886 Harriet Powers's Bible Quilt, 2012.
- “Past Exhibitions.” Past Exhibitions | Page 3 | International Quilt Museum - Lincoln, NE, January 6, 2021.
- Wong, Hertha Dawn. “Faith Ringgold's Story Quilts: ‘All Things American in America Are about Race.’” In Picturing Identity: Contemporary American Autobiography in Image and Text, 196–213. Chapel Hill, North Carolina: The University of North Carolina Press, 2018
- Wulfert, Kimberly. “Women's Symbols of Endurance: QUILTS.” Colonial Revival quilts, Marie Webster. Accessed February 24, 2023.
- Wulfert, K. (n.d.). The Underground Railroad and the Use of Quilts as Messengers for Fleeing Slaves. The Underground Railroad and the use of quilts as messengers for fleeing slaves. Accessed March 22, 2023.
