= Appliqué =

Piece of textile ornament, or work created by applying such ornaments to a ground fabric

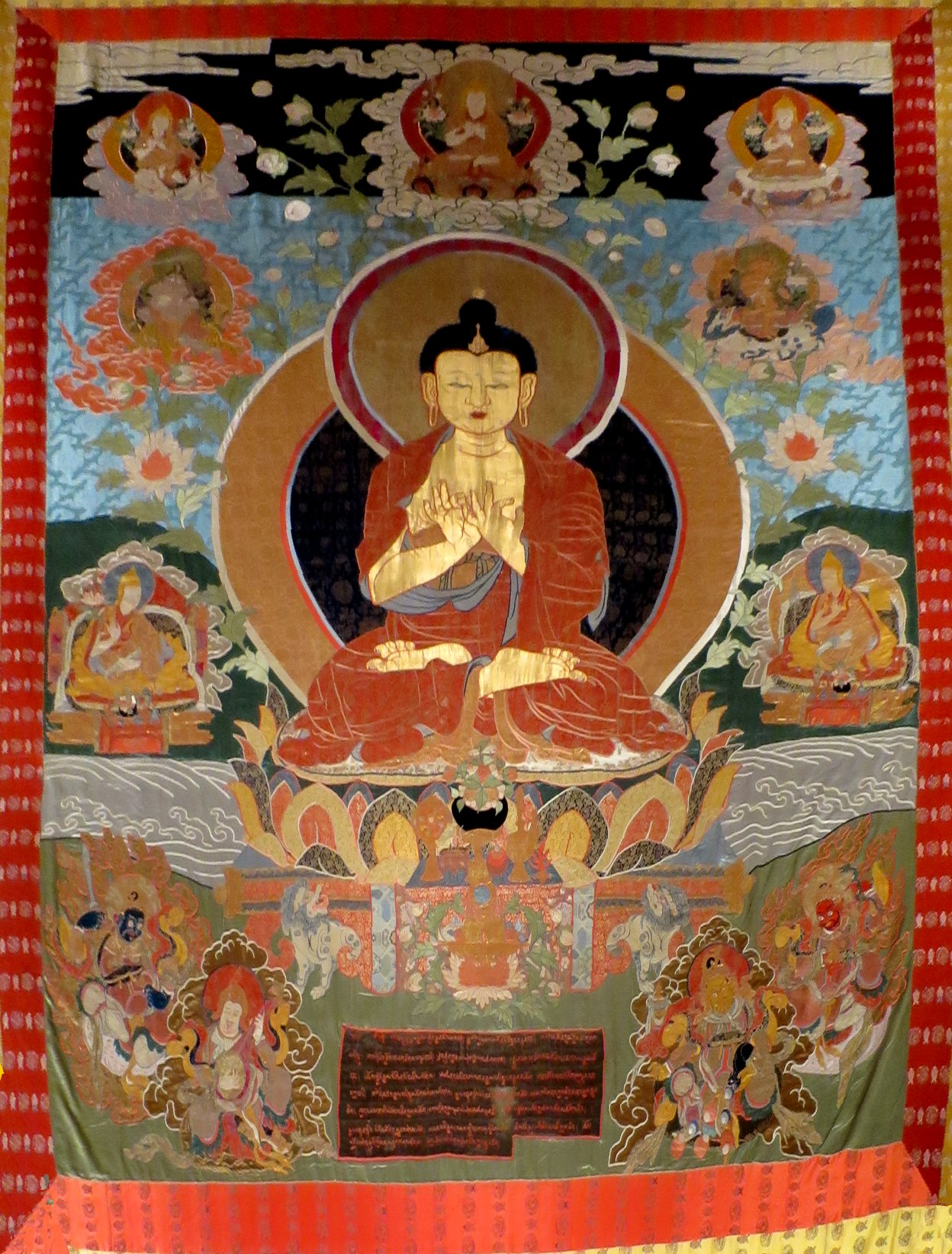
A Future Buddha Maitreya Flanked by the Eighth Dalai Lama and His Tutor, 18th century Tibetan appliquéd silk

Appliqué is ornamental needlework in which pieces or patches of fabric in different shapes and patterns are sewn or stuck onto a larger piece to form a picture or pattern. It is commonly used as decoration, especially on garments. The technique is accomplished either by hand stitching or machine. Appliqué is commonly practiced with textiles, but the term may be applied to similar techniques used on different materials. In the context of ceramics, for example, an appliqué is a separate piece of clay added to the primary work, generally for the purpose of decoration.

The term originates from the Latin applicō "I apply" and subsequently from the French appliquer "attach".

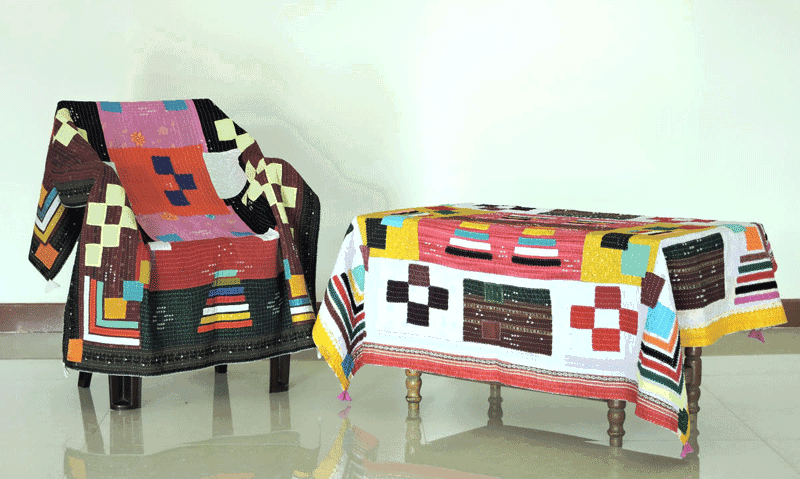
Kaudi: pride of Karnataka

== History ==
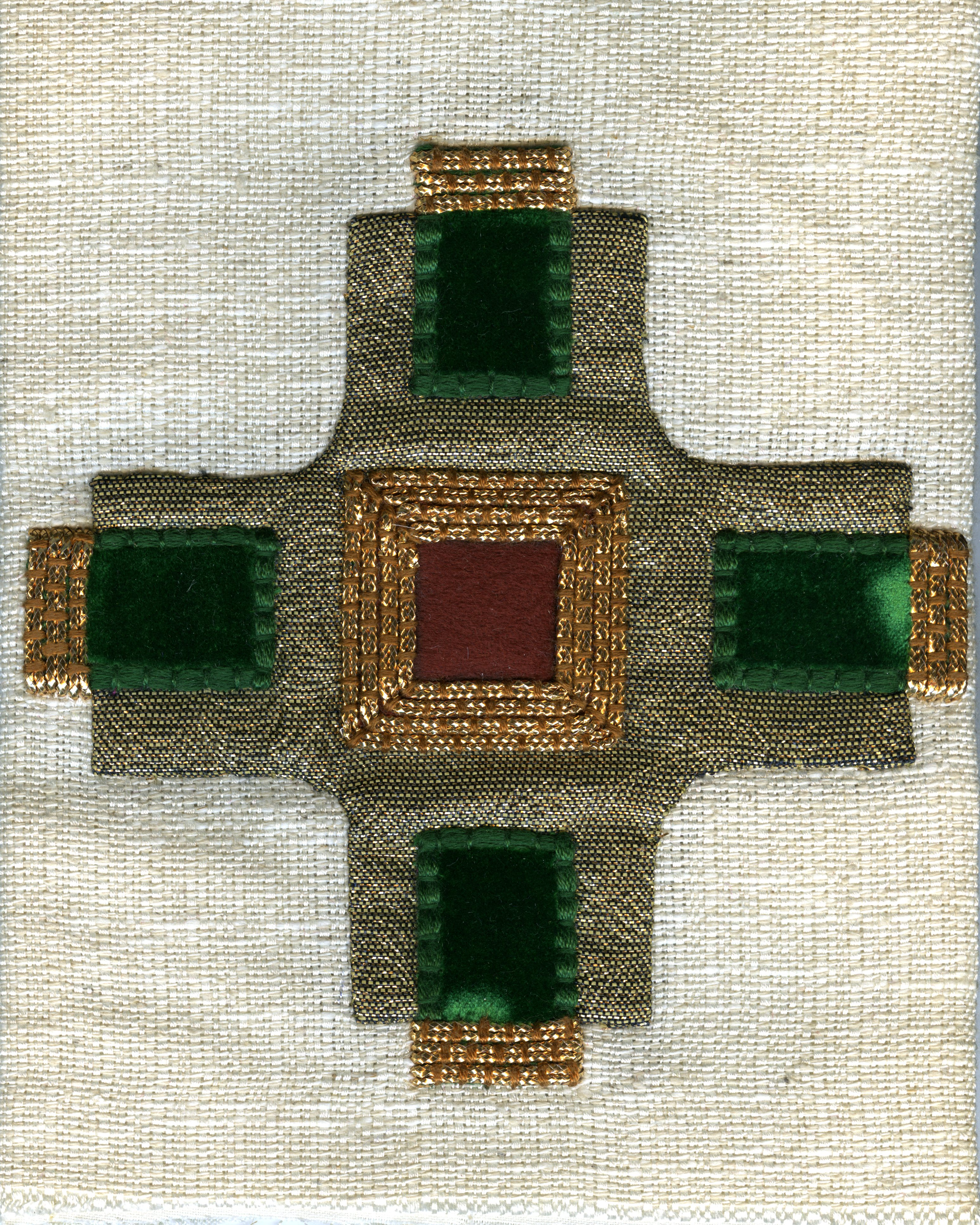
Appliqué cross. The edges are covered and stitches are hidden. It is overlaid with decorative gold thread.

The term appliqué is derived from French and Latin verbs appliquer and applicare, respectively, which both mean to apply or attach. Like embroidery, it has a humble beginning. The technique was used as a way to strengthen worn areas of items or to patch holes that had formed. Early appliqué was used to lengthen the life of clothing and moved into artful techniques that can be seen in blankets and quilts from numerous cultures from all over the world.

Archaeologists have discovered ancient examples of appliquéd leather in Egypt (980 BCE), and leather and felt appliqués have been found on carpets, wall hangings and saddle covers in 4th century BCE tombs in Siberia and Mongolia. Appliquéd cloth is an important art form in Benin, West Africa, particularly in the area around Abomey, where it has been a tradition since the 18th century and the kingdom of Danhomè. There are folk traditions to embellish garments with leather appliqué in Scandinavia, Russia and Eastern Europe, and leather appliqué is also found in Gujarat, India, Pakistan and Morocco where men's clothing and leather slippers are decorated with embroidery and leather appliqué. Felt appliqué is used to add embellishments to women's aprons in Eastern Europe and decorative uses of felt appliqué are also seen among the nomadic tribes of Central Asia to decorate yurts, floor covering and bags. Reverse applique is used on the Mola textiles of South America.

== Types ==
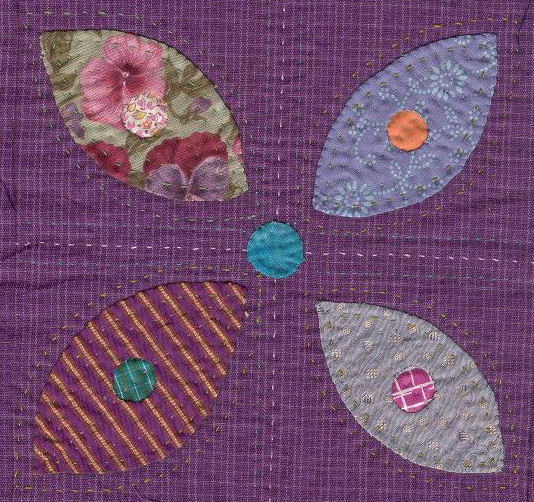
Quilt block in reverse appliqué

In the context of sewing, an appliqué refers to a needlework technique in which patterns or representational scenes are created by the attachment of smaller pieces of fabric to a larger piece of contrasting colour or texture. Good textiles for appliqué are durable and don't easily fray, like felt and leather.

Applied pieces usually have their edges folded under, and are then attached by any of the following:

- Straight stitch, typically 20–30mm in from the edge.
- Satin stitch, all around, overlapping the edge. The patch may be glued or straight stitched on first to ensure positional stability and a neat edge.
- Reverse appliqué: the attached materials are sewn together, then cut away where another material covers it on top, before being sewn down onto the edges of the original material.

=== Quilting ===
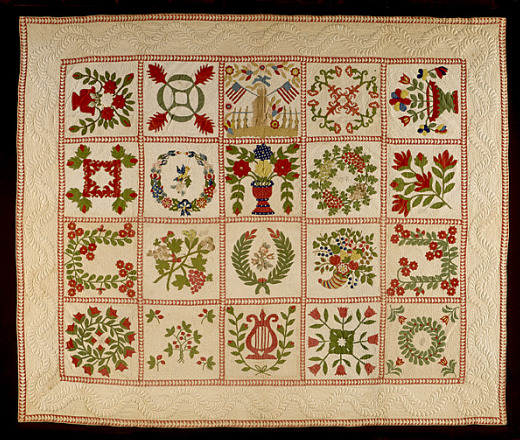
An American quilt, 1848

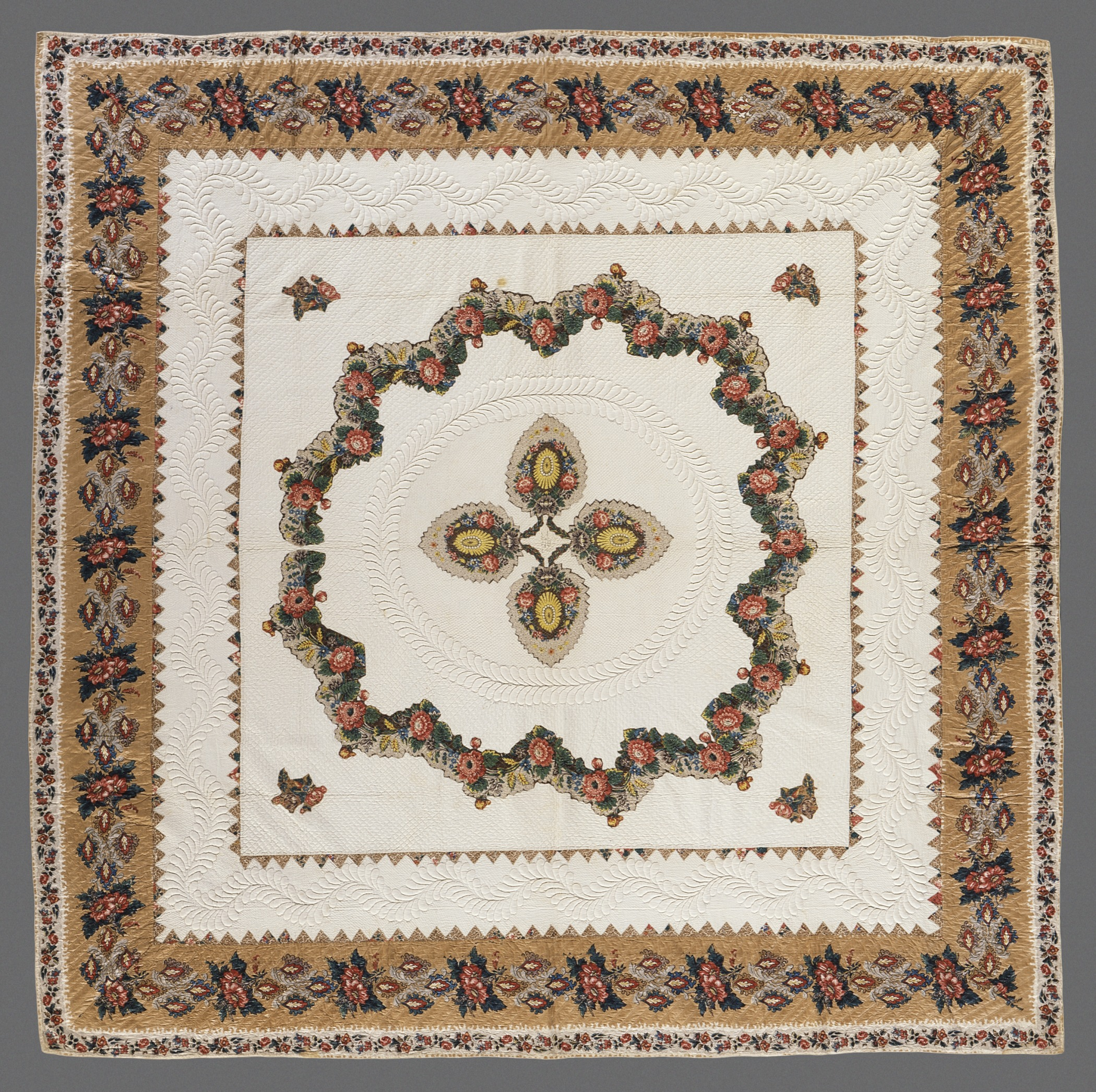
American quilt in Broderie perse, 1846.

Appliqué is used extensively in quilting. "Dresden Plate" and "Sunbonnet Sue" are two examples of traditional American quilt blocks that are constructed with both patchwork and appliqué. Baltimore album quilts, Broderie perse, Hawaiian quilts, Amish quilts, Egyptian Khayamiya, tivaevae, the ralli quilts of India and Pakistan also use appliqué.

=== Banner making ===
It is particularly suitable for work which is to be seen from a distance, such as in banner-making. A famous example of appliqué is the Hastings Embroidery.

=== Seams on couture garments ===
A lace-on-lace applique seam can be used to join edges of lace. Motifs in the design of the lace are overlapped and fastened down with a whipstitch.

== Electronic sewing machines ==
Modern consumer embroidery machines quickly stitch appliqué designs by following a program. The programs have a machine stops during stitching to allow the user to switch threads. First, the fabric that will be the background and the appliqué fabric are affixed into the machine's embroidery hoop. The program is run and the machine makes a loose basting stitch over both layers of fabric. Next, the machine halts for a thread change, or other pre-programmed break. The user then cuts away the excess appliqué fabric from around the basting stitch. Following this, the machine continues on programme, automatically sewing the satin stitches and any decorative stitching over the appliqué for best results.

== See also ==
- Collage, a technique of art production, primarily used in the visual arts, where the artwork is made from an assemblage of different forms, thus creating a new whole.
- Khatwa, the name given to appliqué works in Bihar, India.
- Godadi are the applique style embroidered blankets made by patching various pieces of cloth, in the Kutch district of Gujarat, India
- Appliqué armour, in military use, consists of extra protective plates mounted onto the hull or turret of an armoured fighting vehicle.
