= Patchwork quilt =

Quilt with a design of pieces of fabric

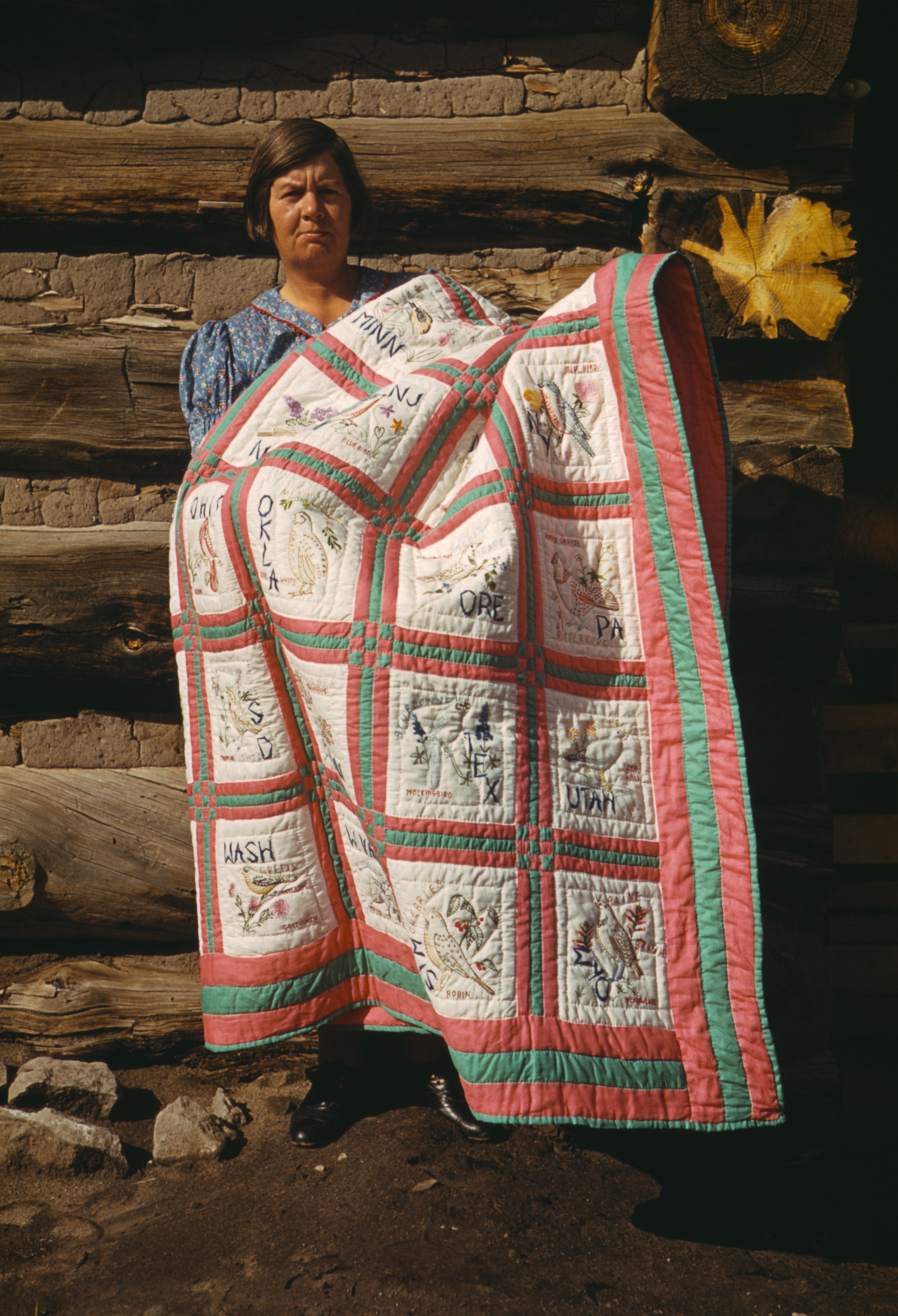
Mrs. Bill Stagg of Pie Town, New Mexico, with her embroidered patchwork quilt that displays all 48 (at the time) United States state flowers and birds, October 1940

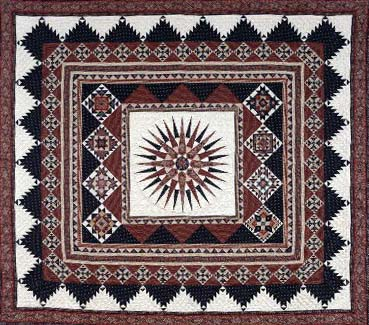
Patchwork quilt: 1992 Kentucky State Winner

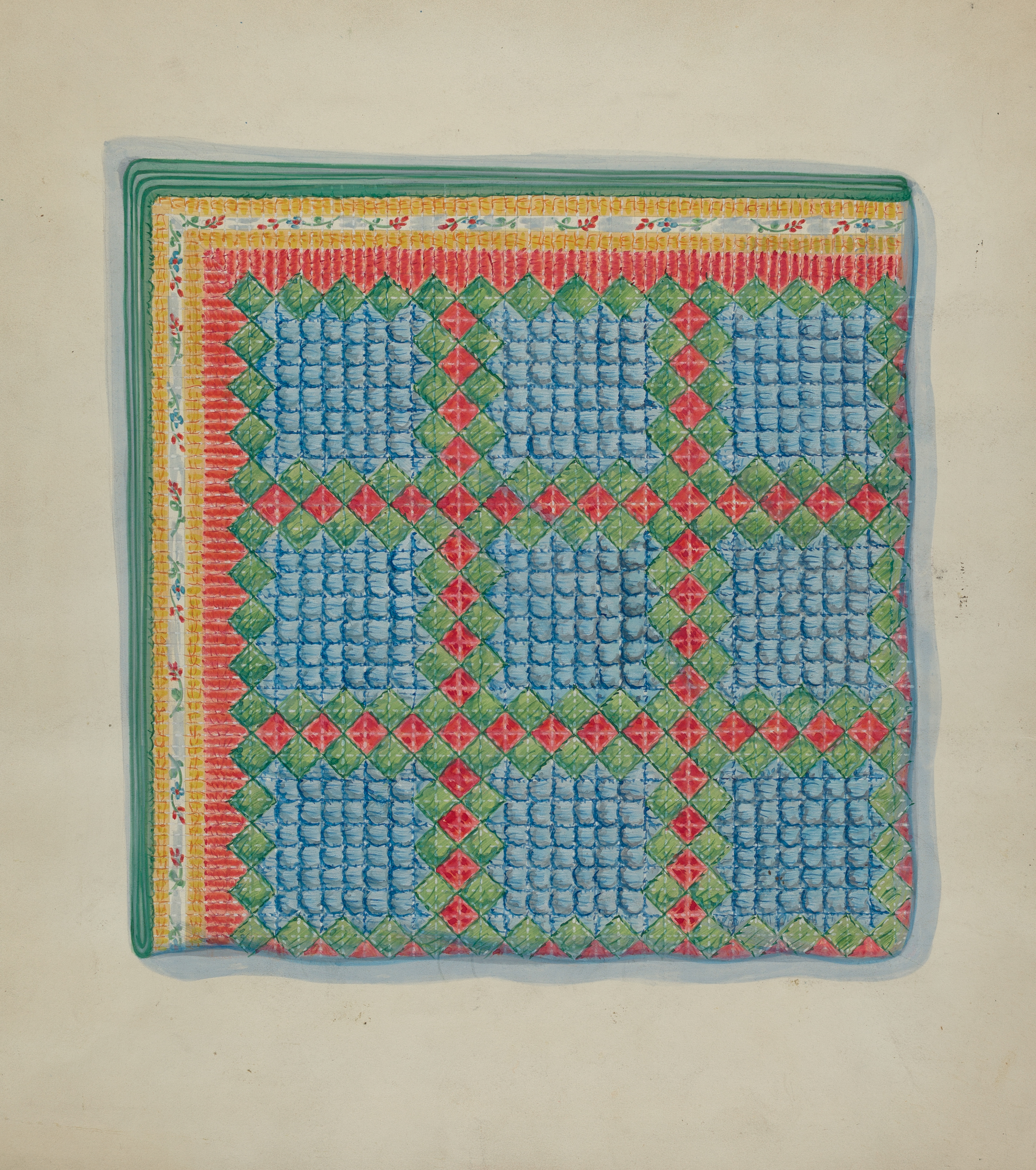
Mabel Ritter, Patchwork Quilt, c. 1936 from the Index of American Design at the National Gallery of Art

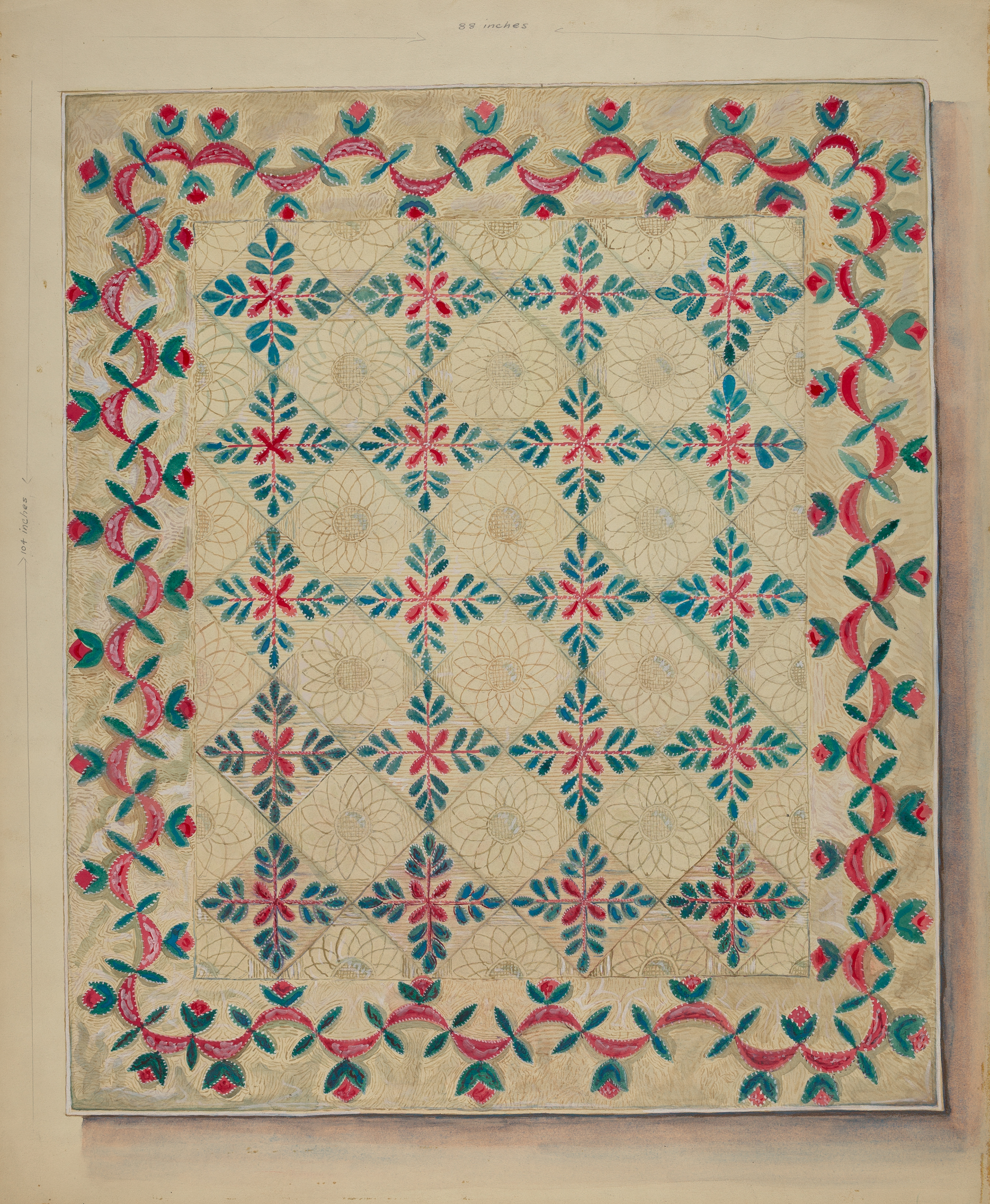
Ella Josephine Sterling, Patchwork Quilt, c. 1936, from the Index of American Design at the National Gallery of Art

A patchwork quilt is a quilt in which the top layer may consist of pieces of fabric sewn together to form a design. Originally, this was to make full use of leftover scraps of fabric, but now fabric is often bought specially for a specific design. Fabrics are now often sold in quarter meters (or quarter yards in the United States). A "fat quarter" is one square meter (or one yard by the width of the fabric, typically 42–44 in) folded into four and cut along the folds, thus giving a relatively square piece of fabric 50 cm (20 in) on a side, as opposed to buying a quarter of a meter off the roll, resulting in a long thin piece that is only 25 cm (10 in) wide.

== Design ==
Designs can be geometric and formal or imaginative. Patchwork blocks were initially created individually, accumulated over time, by use of scrap and salvaged material. Geometric designs were the most efficient way to aggregate fabric into useful units. Applique, where a piece of fabric is layered on top of the a base or "ground" fabric and then the cut edges are folded under and sewn down, is not limited to simple geometric designs. Early uses of applique in the United States included efforts to expand the effect of expensive, imported European fabrics in early America. The dense printed patterns were cut out, spread apart on a background of plain fabric, allowing the effect of the rare fabric to spread further. Broderie perse is a related technique, where selections of printed fabric are cut out, and sewn in place to produce the effect of a custom printed cloth. Reverse appliqué involves cutting the ground fabric, and placing another fabric beneath the opening. The raw, cut edges are folded under, and sewn onto the smaller piece of fabric below, creating a new design.

Additional design options are provided by quilting techniques that alter the texture of the quilt. These include: trapunto (where additional batting to be sewn through is stuffed into a discrete section of the quilting), cording (where cotton cording or yarn are pulled between quilting lines that form channels), and stipple quilting (where dense, closely spaced quilting causes the batting to be more compressed than it is in adjacent areas). Another, more casual option is to "tie" the quilt. Heavy thread or yarn is used to tie all three layers together at points across the surface of the quilt.

== Layering ==
The quilt is formed of three layers: the patchwork quilt top, a layer of insulation wadding (batting), and a layer of backing material. These three layers are stitched together ("quilted"), either by hand or machine. The quilting can either outline the patchwork motifs, or be a completely independent design, for when quilting, the design may not necessarily follow the patchwork design, and the design of the quilting may play off the patchwork design. Outline quilting is when the pieces of the pattern are outlined by the quilting stitches.

== History ==
Though quilting has a long history, likely more than five millennia, and takes various forms in many cultures, the block-style patchwork quilt became a "distinct expression" of nineteenth-century America, evolving into a representative folk art of interest to scholars that is still produced today. Eighteenth-century patchwork "was a ladies’ leisure pursuit" in both Europe and North America, with the earliest surviving specimens from Wiltshire in 1718 and Quebec in 1726 made of silk. The lack of information about earlier quilts made of humbler fabric, is partly attributed to such quilts being "intimately connected to everyday life" of the Dutch and English settlers in the New World. As a heritage object with distinctive patterns, the patchwork quilt has come to be particularly associated with Canada and the United States. A twenty-first-century offshoot is the barn quilt.

Quilting was a very popular early American pastime, first in the Midwest, where quilting circles were a common social pastime for women, and later on the Great Plains, especially from 1825 to 1875, where quilting bees, when many women gathered around a quilting frame and quilted, became important social occasions. Such affairs might last overnight and sometimes took on political significance, such as during the movement for abolition. Annual town fairs generally included a quilting prize to award excellence in quilting. Handmade quilts were a very common wedding gift for young couples, and were often mentioned specifically in wills due to their sentimental significance. It was not uncommon, in early American culture, for quilts to reflect a mosaic of a woman's life, often including swatches of material from memorable events such as pieces of a wedding gown or a child's baptismal garment. The Amish people are famous for their geometric patchwork designs made with solid color fabrics, with independent patterns and quilting; typical motifs include floral designs and heart shapes. The Amish and Mennonite women of the Pennsylvania Dutch country have been creating exquisite quilted masterpieces since the mid-19th century (and some believe even earlier). Amish quilts are an expression of frugality. They not only serve a practical, functional purpose, but serve as a form of entertainment as well.

In 1987 in San Francisco, the Names Project commenced as a memorial to the lives of people who died from AIDS and related diseases with quilt panels made by loved ones. Also known as the AIDS Quilt, it grew to comprise many thousands of panels, and spawned similar projects in countries around the globe. In later years, other subject- and event-specific community-based quilts have been created.

== Colorwash quilting ==
This non-traditional method of quilting uses small blocks of color to achieve the look of a watercolor painting where there is no fixed pattern. Fabrics are chosen for their hue and tone.

== See also ==
- History of quilting
- Quilting
- Patchwork
- Quilt trail
- Quilt art
