= Godadi =

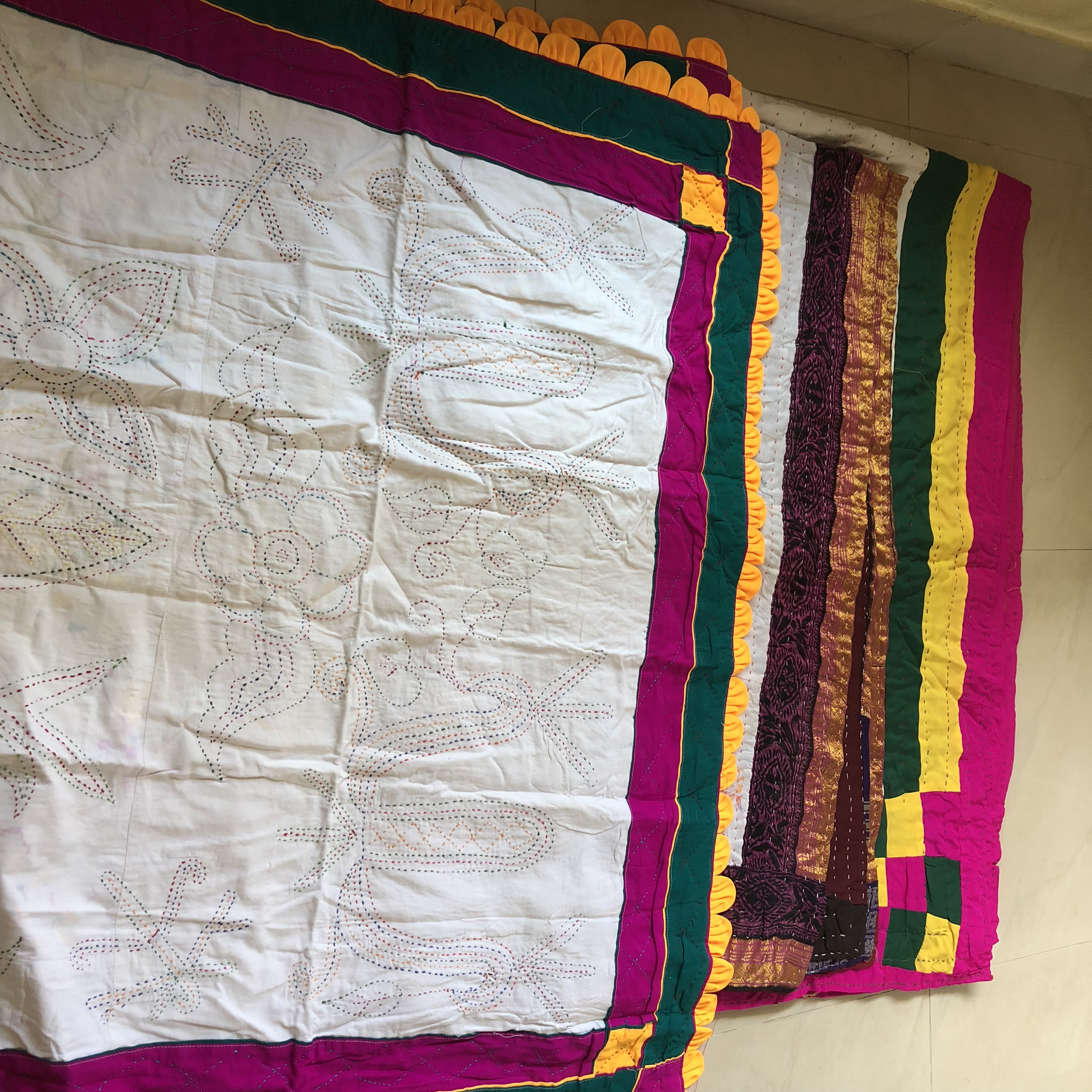
Embroidered Godadi(Blanket)

Godadi or Godhadi or Gudri is a word used to refer to a quilt. A variant of the word exists in several Indian languages, including Hindi, Marathi, Urdu, Gujarati, Konkani, Kannada, and Punjabi, and other north Indian and southern languages and dialects. Godadi is a special kind of patchwork quilt which may be embroidered and is made of multiple kinds of cloth.

Traditionally, Godadi was handmade by housewives in various parts of India. In some places, such as Maharashtra, Gujarat, and north India, bits from used clothing, including sarees and dupattas, would be stitched together, sometimes in decorative patterns. In Konkan, very finely embroidered and intricately patched godadis are given as a part of bride's trousseau. In eastern India, especially Orissa and Bengal, they are also called "Kantha".

A variant of the godadi is razai, though razais are thicker and can also have cotton stuffing for more warmth during winters.

== History ==
India's quilting tradition has been traced back to some 4000 years. After the Portuguese came to India in the 15th century, the godadis may have been traded to Europe and the cultural ideas may have led to different design ideas as well. There were no factories or production outlets for woollen or cotton blankets in much of India. Unused or worn pieces of clothing items like shirts, saris and dupattas were collected over time. Women would collect items and create a design, then cut the cloth into shapes and sew them together to construct the quilt. Over time, pieces of cotton became available in the market, which helped girls and housewives to make a decorated quilt by embedding them with different designs. The tradition of making handmade blankets has continued into the 21st century. Due to cultural value placed on traditional designs, these blankets remain popular and are used by many people in India.

== Availability of handmade Godadi ==
The revival of the craft of Godadi making is unfolding across India, not only as an age-old tradition but also because it is sustainable. There are a variety of Godadis, such as designed Godadi from the same piece of cotton cloth, embroidered Godadi and Godadi from patched clothes.
