= Broderie perse =

Style of appliqué

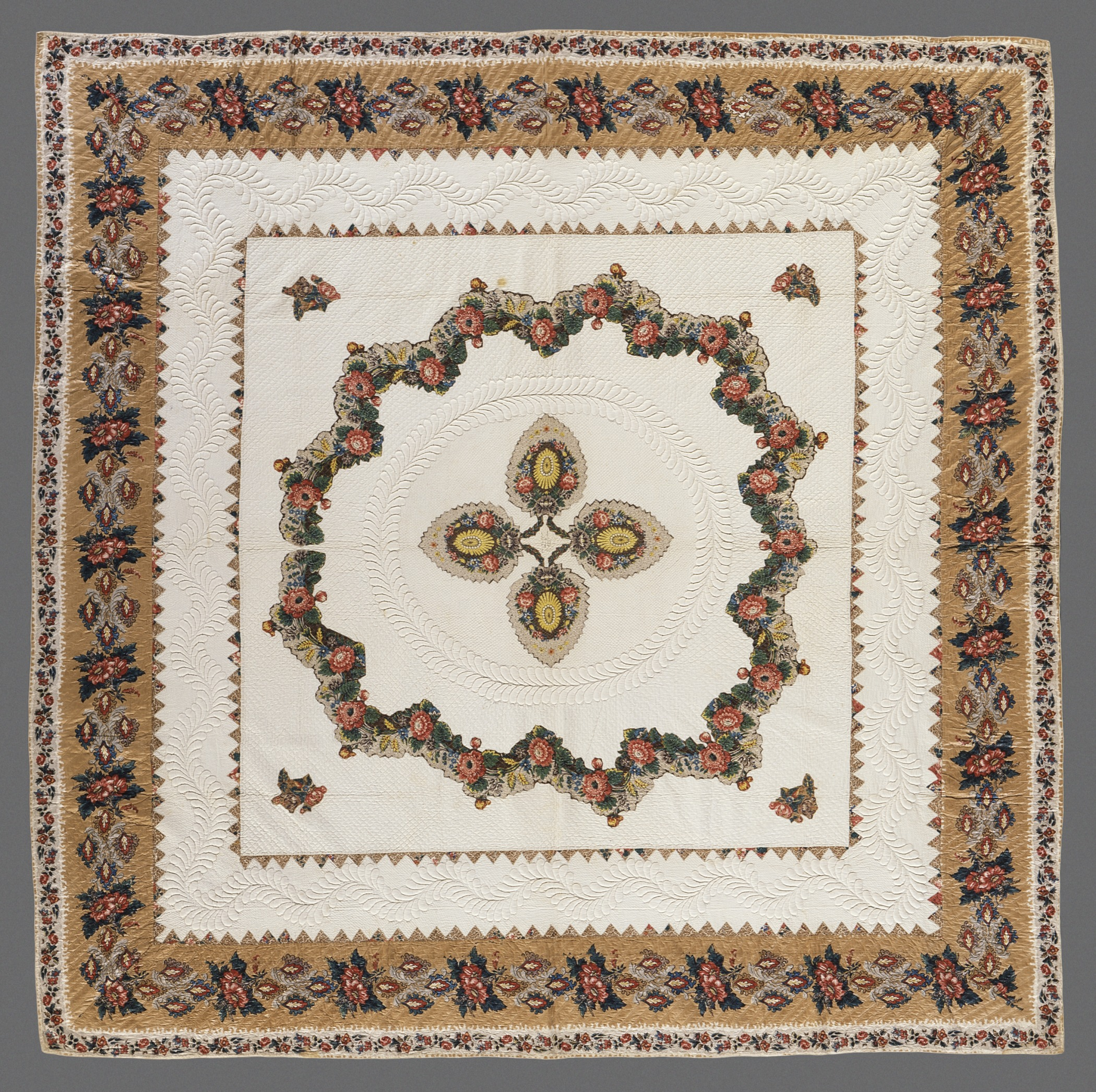
American quilt in Broderie perse, 1846

Broderie perse (French for "Persian embroidery") is a style of appliqué which uses printed motifs from one fabric to create a design on a background fabric. It was popular in the late 18th century and early 19th centuries. The technique could be considered an early form of puzzle piecing.

== Description ==
Broderie perse can be done with any printed fabric on any ground, but it originally was worked with Chintz type fabrics, often imported from India. Chintz typically has clearly defined, separated motifs, which were cut out and invisibly applied onto the ground fabric. Using motifs from the expensive, highly-prized fabric was a way to make the patterned fabric last longer. The typical intention was to create a scene from the motifs, but the decoration could also be random. Because the scale of the different motifs was not always considered, there might be a naive appearance to Broderie perse.

== Process ==
Designs are cut out, leaving a small, even amount of fabric around the outside of the design. This is turned under and the whole design was tacked onto the background fabric. Final stitching would be done with a slipstitch, herringbone, or decorative blanket stitch.

== Uses ==
The resulting fabric was often made into bedspreads, either unlined for summer or quilted for winter. They were typically saved for special occasions, such as guest beds.

== Examples ==
A noted example of Broderie perse is the central panel of the Rajah Quilt which was made by women as they were transported to Tasmania in 1841. The quilt was rediscovered in 1989 and is now in Australia.

== See also ==
- History of quilting
