= Razai =

Type of quilt used in South Asia

Arzaai or Razai (Hindustani: रज़ाई, رزائی; Punjabi: ਰਜ਼ਾਈ, رزائی; Bengali: রেজাই, romanized: rezāi) is a bedding (quilt) very similar to, if not a type of, duvet or comforter, used in Afghanistan, Pakistan, India, Bangladesh and Nepal. Razais usually have a cotton, silk or velvet cover which is stuffed with cotton wool. They can provide a great deal of warmth even in the very cold weather that can occur in these regions, primarily due to the insulating effects of the large amount of air trapped in the cotton wool.

== Maintenance ==
The cotton wool in a razai clumps over time, thinning the razai and driving the air out, which causes the razai to become less effective as a protection against the cold. For this reason, prior to the onset of winter weather, it is common for families to get their razais carded: the cotton wool in the razai is removed, carded to eliminate the clumping, and reinserted into the razai-cover. This is done by razai-carders (called dhuniyas or dhunnas, see the Australian English term for duvet, "doona") who are professionally adept and seasonally employed in this activity. The bowed carding instrument, called the dhunki, has a distinctive twang when it is in use or its string is plucked. This twang is a common daytime sound in rural areas in the autumn, and is sometimes used as a cultural reference to the onset of winter in local literature and movies.

== Business ==
Many businesses have been set up to sell quilts. The quilt market is big, and culture and local customs have evolved to make quilts into an international business opportunity.

A quality of Razai known as 100gram Jaipuri Razai is sold by many businesses in Jaipur, and is considered as being one of the most authentic Razai.
