= Patchwork =

Needlework with fabric pieces sewn together

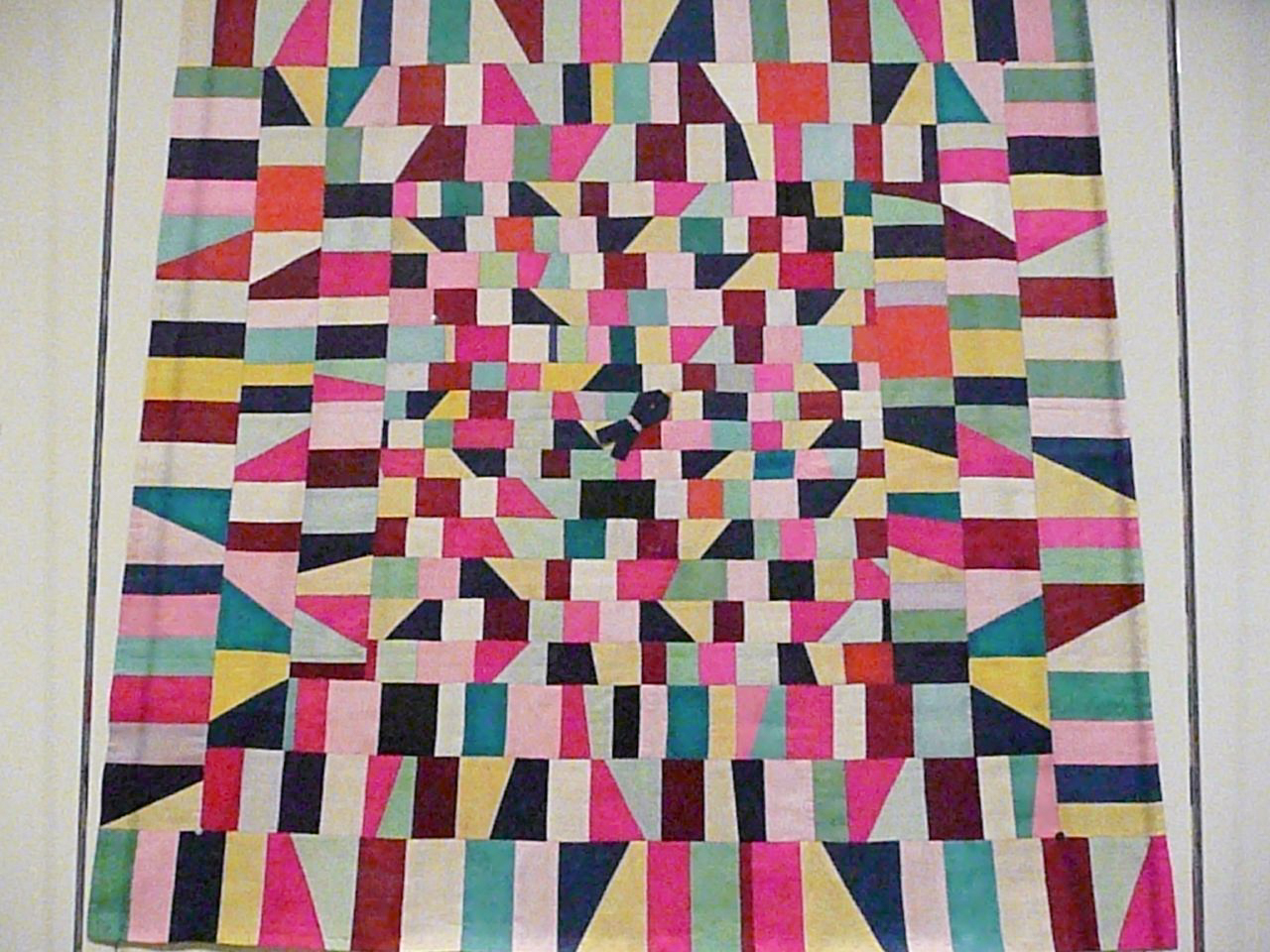
Traditional Korean patchwork pojagi wrapping cloth

Patchwork or "pieced work" is a form of needlework that involves sewing together pieces of fabric into a larger design. The larger design is usually based on repeating patterns built up with different fabric shapes (which can be different colors). These shapes are carefully measured and cut, basic geometric shapes making them easy to piece together.

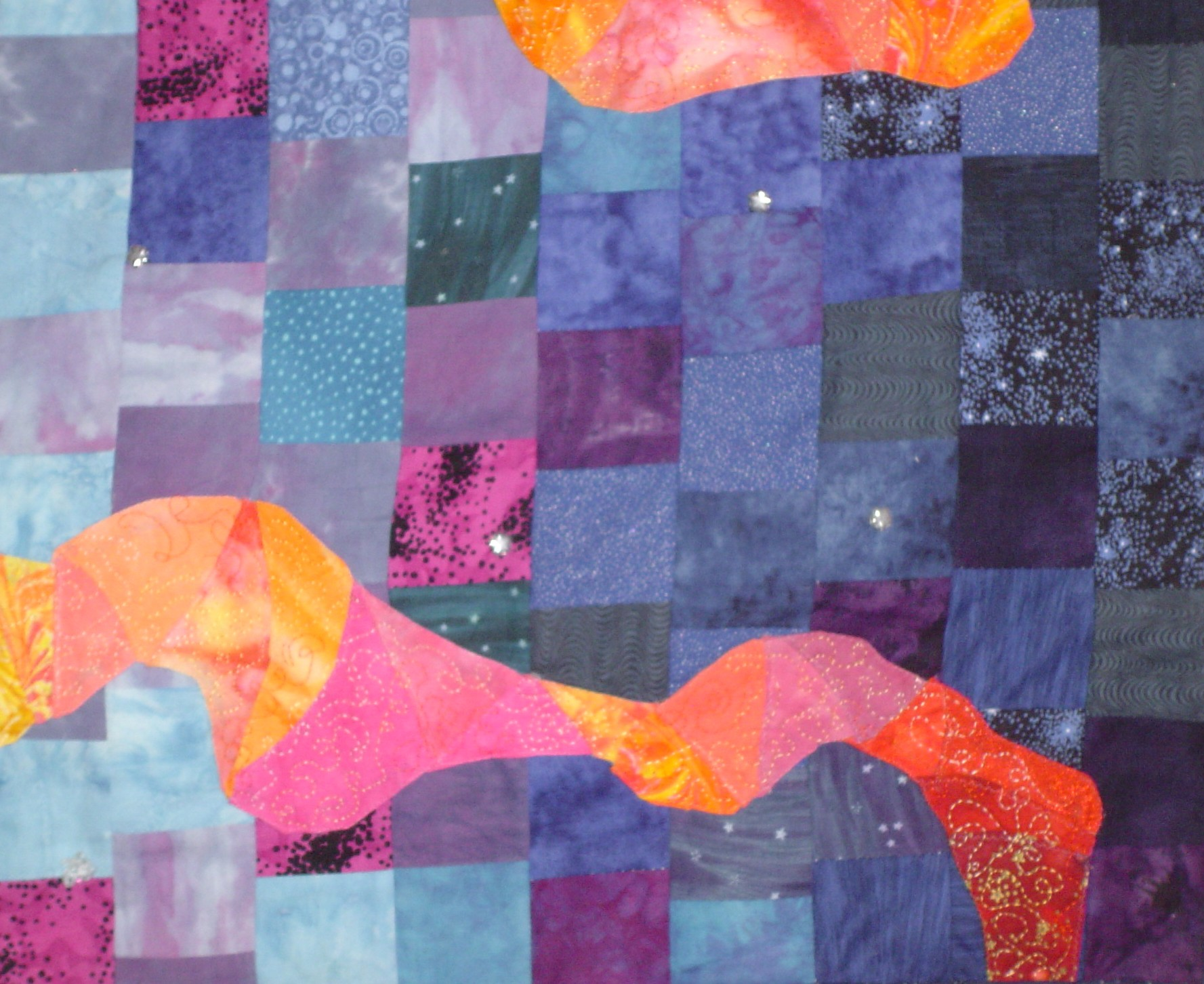
Example of patchwork

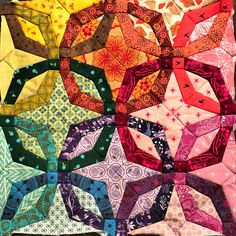
Example of hand-pieced patchwork

== Uses ==
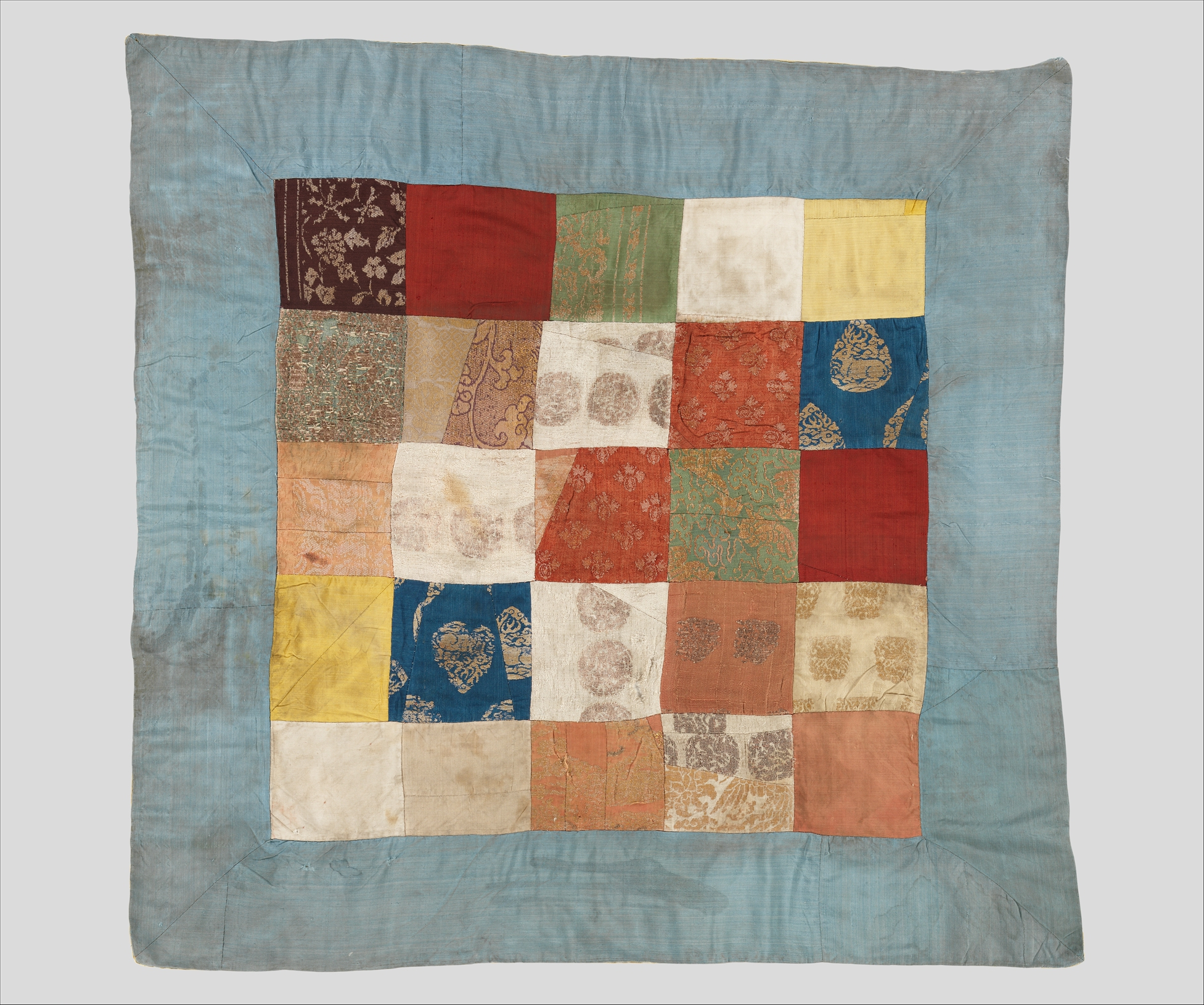
Chinese patchwork of Woven Textiles, Yuan - early Ming dynasty

Patchwork is often used to make quilts, but it can also be used to make rugs, bags, wall-hangings, warm jackets, cushion covers, skirts, waistcoats and other items of clothing. Some textile artists work with patchwork, often combining it with embroidery and other forms of stitchery.

When used to make a quilt, this larger patchwork or pieced design becomes the "top" of a three-layered quilt, the middle layer being the batting and the bottom layer the backing. To keep the batting from shifting, a patchwork or pieced quilt is often quilted by hand or machine using a running stitch in order to outline the individual shapes that make up the pieced top, or the quilting stitches may be random or highly ordered overall patterns that contrast with the patchwork composition.

== History ==
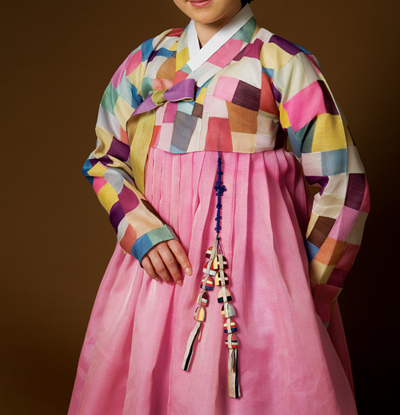
Woman wearing a traditional jeogori (jacket) made with Jogakbo, or Korean patchwork

Evidence of patchwork—piecing small pieces of fabric together to create a larger piece and quilting layers of textile fabrics together—has been found throughout history. Patchwork was used by ancient Egyptians for their clothes, wall decorations, draperies and furniture, with oldest depictions from 5,500 years ago (3,400 BCE). Chinese patchwork is storied to have begun by emperor Liu Yu of the Liu Song dynasty. Earliest preserved pieces have been dated from the early Middle Ages, where among other uses layers of quilted fabric were used in the construction of armor—this kept the soldiers warm and protected. Japanese armor was made in a similar fashion.

Using this technique, quilts began to appear in households of the 11th to 13th centuries. As the European climate became colder around this time, the incidence of the use of bed quilts rose, and so developed the practice of embellishing a simple cloth through the creation of pattern and design, alongside the development of decorative quilting. The tradition of making quilts in this fashion was taken to America by the Pilgrims.

=== The United States ===
Patchwork enjoyed a widespread revival during the Great Depression as a way to recycle worn clothing into warm quilts. Even very small and worn pieces of material are suitable for use in patchwork, although crafters today more often use new 100% cotton fabrics as the basis for their designs. In the US, patchwork declined after World War II but was again revived during the American bicentennial. In the past, hand quilting was often done in a group around a frame. Instead of quilting, the layers are sometimes tied together at regular intervals with pieces of yarn, a practice known as tying or knotting, and which produces a "comforter".

==== Popularity ====
The 2003 Quilting in America survey estimated that the total value of the American quilting industry was $2.7 billion. International quilting exhibitions attract thousands of visitors, while countless smaller exhibitions are held every weekend in local regions. Active cyber-quilting communities abound on the web; books and magazines on the subject are published in the hundreds every year; and there are many active local quilting guilds and shops in different countries. "Quilt Art" is established as a legitimate artistic medium, with quilted works of art selling for thousands of dollars to corporate buyers and galleries. Quilt historians and quilt appraisers are re-evaluating the heritage of traditional quilting and antique quilts, while superb examples of antique quilts are purchased for large sums by collectors and museums. The American Quilt Study Group is active in promotion of research on the history of quilting.

=== Asia ===
In India Kantha originated from the Sanskrit word kontha, which means rags, as the blankets are made out of rags using different scrap pieces of cloth. Nakshi kantha consisting of a running (embroidery) stitch, similar to the Japanese Sashiko is used for decorating and reinforcing the cloth and sewing patterns. Katab work called in Kutch. It is popularly known as Koudhi in Karnataka. Such blankets are given as gifts to newborn babies in many parts of India. Lambani tribes wear skirts with such art.

Patchwork is also done in various parts of Pakistan, especially in the Sindh region, where they call it ralli. Pakistani ralli quilts are known across the subcontinent and in the West. These quilts are a part of their tradition and are made by women. Now these are gaining recognition even though they have been making them for thousands of years.

Patchwork is also common in Azerbaijan, where it is called qurama.

=== Egypt ===
The history of patchwork is not all recent. Patchwork was used by Ancient Egyptians on their clothing and walls. An Egyptian queen, Esi-Mem-Kev, who lived around 980 BCE possessed a patchwork funeral canopy which was found in her tomb.

== Structure ==
There are three traditional structures used to construct a patchwork or pieced composition: 1) the block, 2) overall, and 3) strip piecing. Traditional patchwork has identifying names based on the arrangement of colors and shapes.

=== Blocks ===
Patchwork blocks are pieced squares made up of colored shapes that repeat specific shapes to create patterns within the square or block of, say, light and dark or contrasting colors (motif). The blocks can all repeat the same pattern, or blocks can have several different patterns. The patchwork blocks are typically around 8–10 in^{2} (52–65 cm^{2}). They are sewn together in stacked rows to make a larger composition. Often strips of contrasting fabric forming a lattice separate the patchwork blocks from each other. Some common patchwork block names are Log Cabin, Drunkard's Path, Bear's Paw, Tulip, and Nine Patch.

A unique form of patchwork quilt is the crazy quilt. Crazy quilting was popular during the Victorian era (mid–late 19th century). The crazy quilt is made up of random shapes of luxurious fabric such as velvets, silks, and brocades and buttons, lace, and other embellishments left over from the gowns they had made for themselves. The patchwork pieces are stitched together forming "crazy" or non-repeat, asymmetric compositions. Fancy embroidery embellishes the seam lines between the individual, pieced shapes. The crazy quilt was a status symbol, as only well-to-do women had a staff to do all the household work, and had the time to sew their crazy quilt. Traditionally, the top was left without lining or batting. Many surviving crazy quilts still have the newspaper and other foundation papers used for piecing.

=== Overall ===
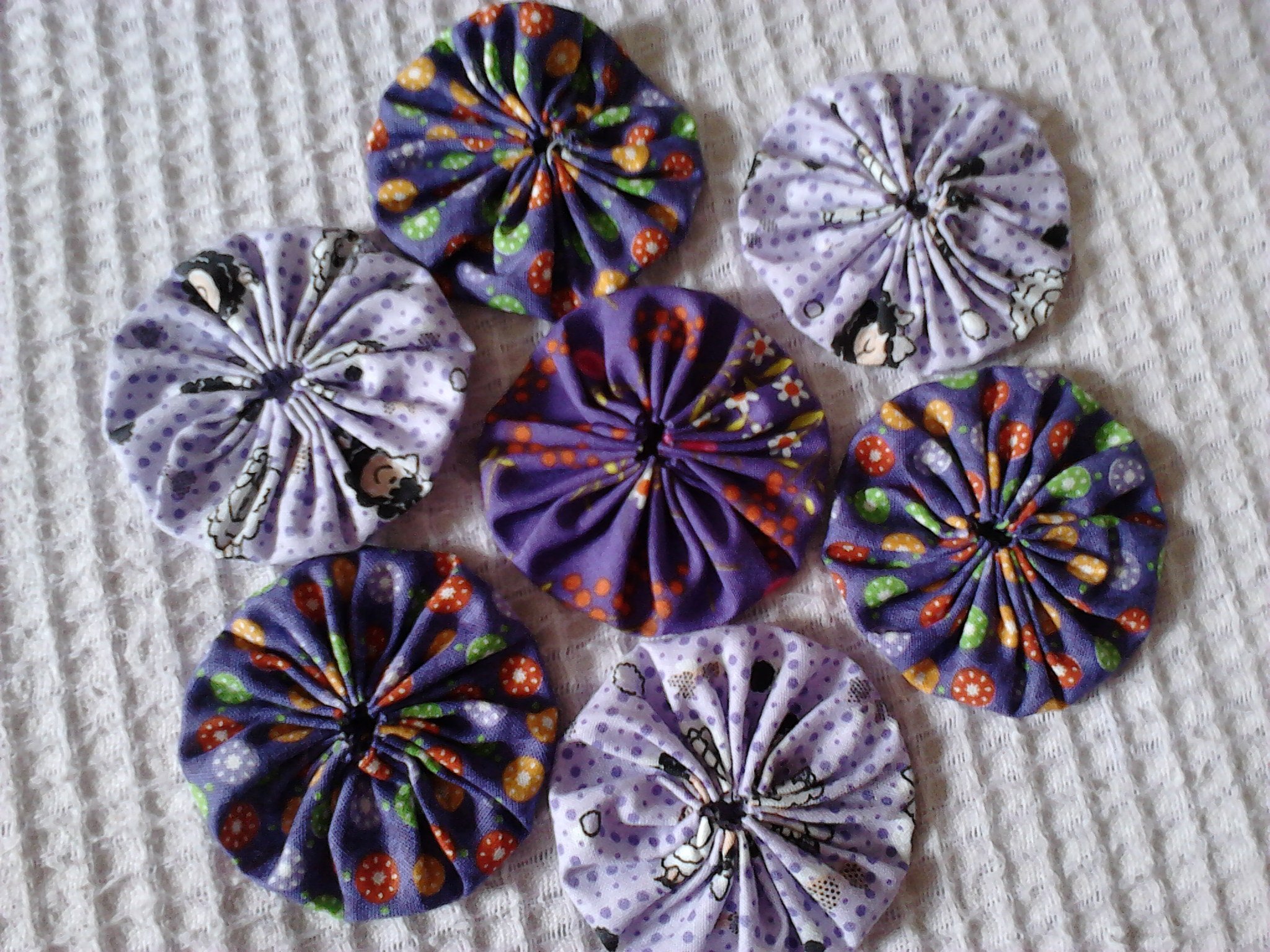
Suffolk puffs

Overall patchwork designs are incrementally pieced geometric shapes stitched together to form a larger random or composed design. The colored shapes can be randomly pieced or follow a strict order to create a specific effect, e.g. value (light to dark) progressions, or checkerboard effects. Names such as Hit or Miss, Clamshell, back-stitch, needle weave, criss-cross, and Starburst identify some overall patchwork structures.

Round pieces formed by cutting a circle of fabric, gathering the edges with a running stitch and pulling them tightly shut are known as Suffolk puffs in the United Kingdom due to the Suffolk wool used to pad them. In the United States, the pieces are called yo-yos. The origin date of this type of piecework is unknown, but it was popular in the United States during the Great Depression and in the United Kingdom after World War II. These round pieces can be joined with several stitches on the sides to connect other puffs together and form a coverlet or other items. Scrap pieces may be used, or colors may be coordinated into patterns.

=== Strip piecing ===
Strip piecing involves stitching together pieces of fabric in repeat patterns into long strips and then stitching the strips together lengthwise. The patchwork strips can be alternated with strips of contrasting colors. A typical strip patchwork quilt is the Four Patch pattern.

== Forms ==
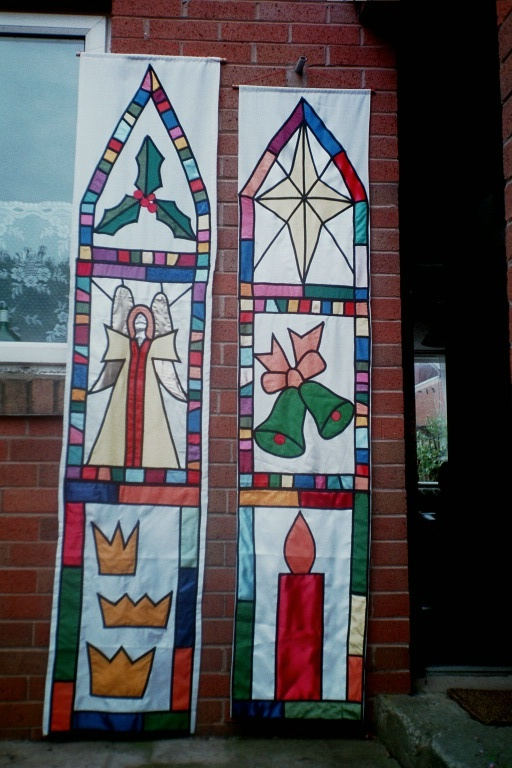
Example of stained glass window patchwork

Specialised forms of patchwork include:

- Cathedral window
- Cutting mat
- Scrap piecework
- Foundation piecework or the closely related
- English paper piecing
- Seminole patchwork
- Hawaiian piecework (primarily applique)
- Stained glass window patchwork, used to simulate the effect of stained glass in church windows. Satin fabrics simulate the colored glass, and black bias binding tape simulates the lead.

== Sources ==
- Zaman, Niaz (1993). The Art of Kantha Embroidery (Second Revised ed.). Dhaka: University Press. ISBN 978-984-05-1228-7.
