= Foundation piecing =

Method of assembling patchwork textiles

In patchwork, foundation piecing was originally a method used to stabilize pieces of fabric that were stitched together. It first became popular in the 18th and 19th centuries in England, although a 15th-century Italian piece, the Impruneta cushion owned by Antonio degli Agli, may have used foundation piecing. A similar process popular in Britain is English paper piecing.

Originally pieces of scrap fabric or muslin were used as the foundation. Recently, the use of paper, whether tracing paper, freezer paper or some other heavyweight paper, has become very popular for use as a pattern, in creating quilt blocks that are all the same size, each with precise, sharp points and perfectly matched intersections. In addition, information such as color and fabric choices can be written on the paper foundation in order to facilitate the construction of the piece and reducing room for error while sewing.

With paper piecing, a shorter stitch length (such as 12 stitches per inch) is used when sewing the components together. This perforates the foundation, making it easier to tear away after the block is completed. Several methods can be used to prepare the design for use on the foundation: tracing, photocopying, computer printing, needle punching, and pre-set designs.

There are three primary techniques used when foundation piecing: top pressed, under pressed, and single template piecing. The technique used is dependent upon preference and the pattern of the design being sewn. However, under pressed piecing allows for greater accuracy because the sewing is done right on the foundation with the fabric underneath, which allows the stitcher to view the marked seam line and sew directly on it.

== See also ==
- Interfacing
- Quilting
