= Nine patch =

Nine patch or nine-patch may refer to:

- Nine patch, a North American pieced quilt pattern
- 9-patch, also known as 9-slice scaling, an image resizing technique
