= Granny square =

Crocheted block assembled to make larger textiles

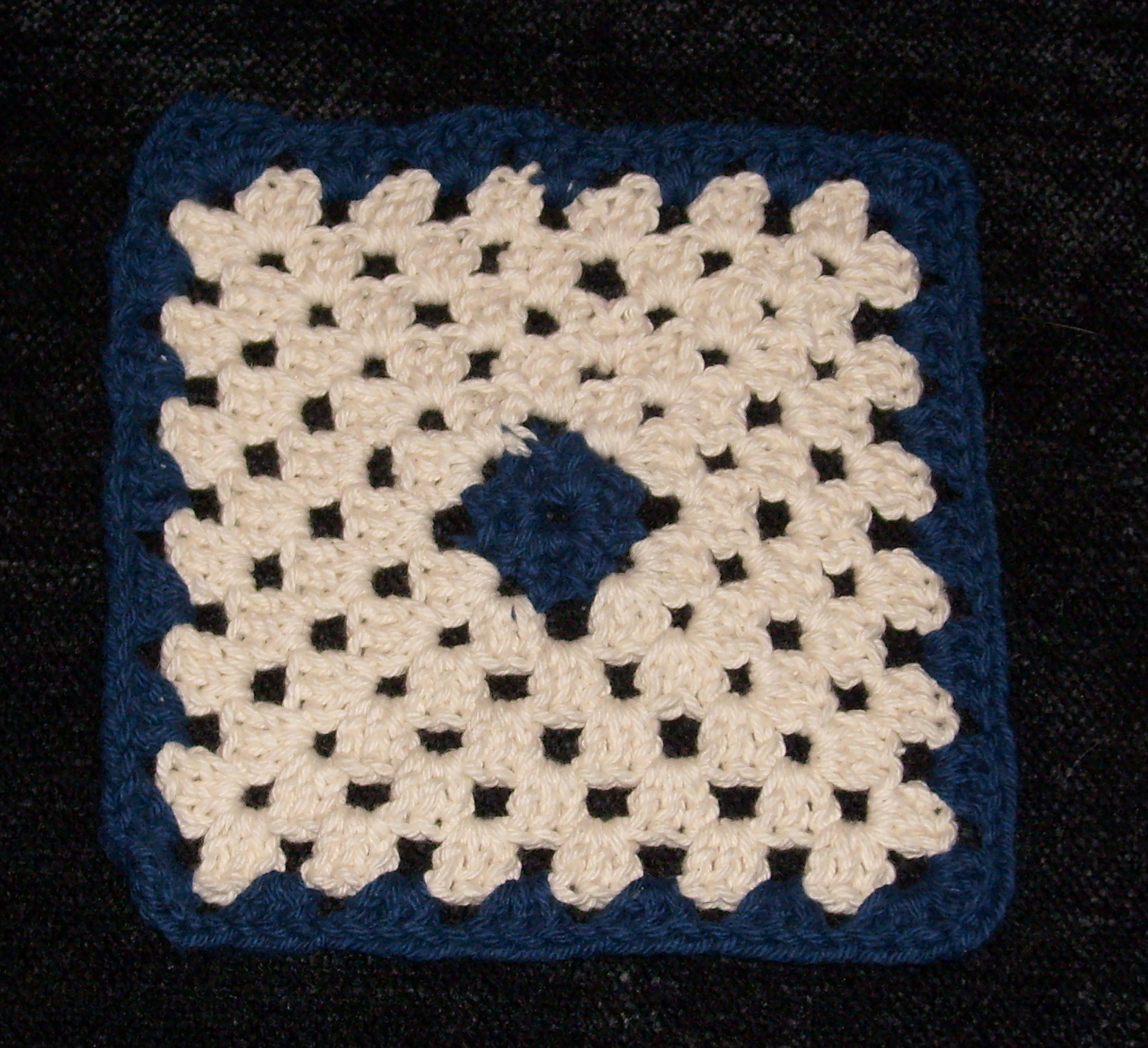
A granny square worked in two colors and seven rounds. Cotton, four-millimetre (0.16 in) crochet hook.

A granny square is a piece of square fabric produced in crochet by working in rounds from the center outward. Granny squares are traditionally handmade as crochet and cannot be manufactured by machine. They resemble coarse lace. Although there is no theoretical limit to the maximum size of a granny square, crocheters usually create multiple small squares (called "motifs") and assemble the pieces to make clothing, purses, Afghan blankets, and other household textiles.

Granny square apparel is a cyclical fashion that peaked in the 1970s. As Stitch 'n Bitch series author Debbie Stoller describes:

If you grew up in the seventies, as I did, you might fear the granny square—if only because, for a while, clothing was made of nothing else. Granny square vests, granny square shorts, granny square hats. Heck, I bet there was some kid out there who was forced to go to school wearing granny square underwear.

Although particular color and pattern schemes for granny squares change with time, this class of motif is a staple among crocheters. Multicolor granny squares are an effective way to use up small amounts of yarn left over from other projects and basic granny square motifs do not require advanced skills to execute.

== History ==
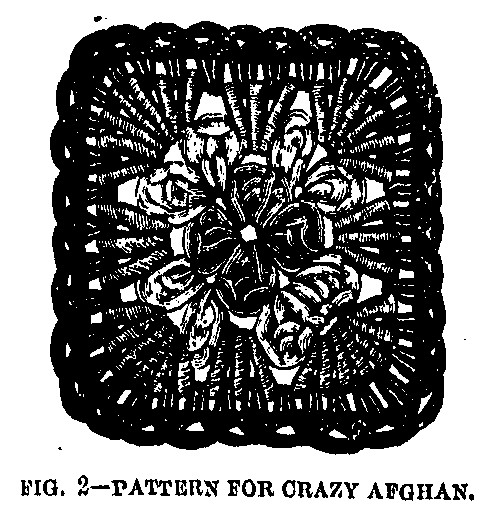
Granny Square design by Mrs. Phelps in April 4, 1885 issue of Prairie Farmer

The earliest known example of a traditional granny square, designed by a Mrs. Phelps, was published in the April 5, 1885, edition of Prairie Farmer. She wrote:

I have been trying a new crocheted pattern for an Afghan, which is on the principle of the crazy work so popular now. It is made in strips of the desired length, and with two of the blocks, which I have brought, forming the width (fig. 2). The long strips are crocheted together with a double chain stitch which is twisted, and of any two desirable colors. The small blocks can be sewn or drawn together, so as to make a perfect square, this joining being done on the wrong side. The idea is to have the blocks appear as one straight strip. Use Germantown wool, the colors of the block being bright and varied to one’s taste, but the outer edge of each is black.

The "crazy work" she refers to is crazy quilting, which was a popular trend at the time. During this era, it was traditional for women to use black ribbon on the borders between crazy quilt squares—much like the black borders of a traditional granny square.

The granny square motif reappeared in the 1930s, and the pattern was featured in publications such as Fleisher's Afghans.

== Construction ==
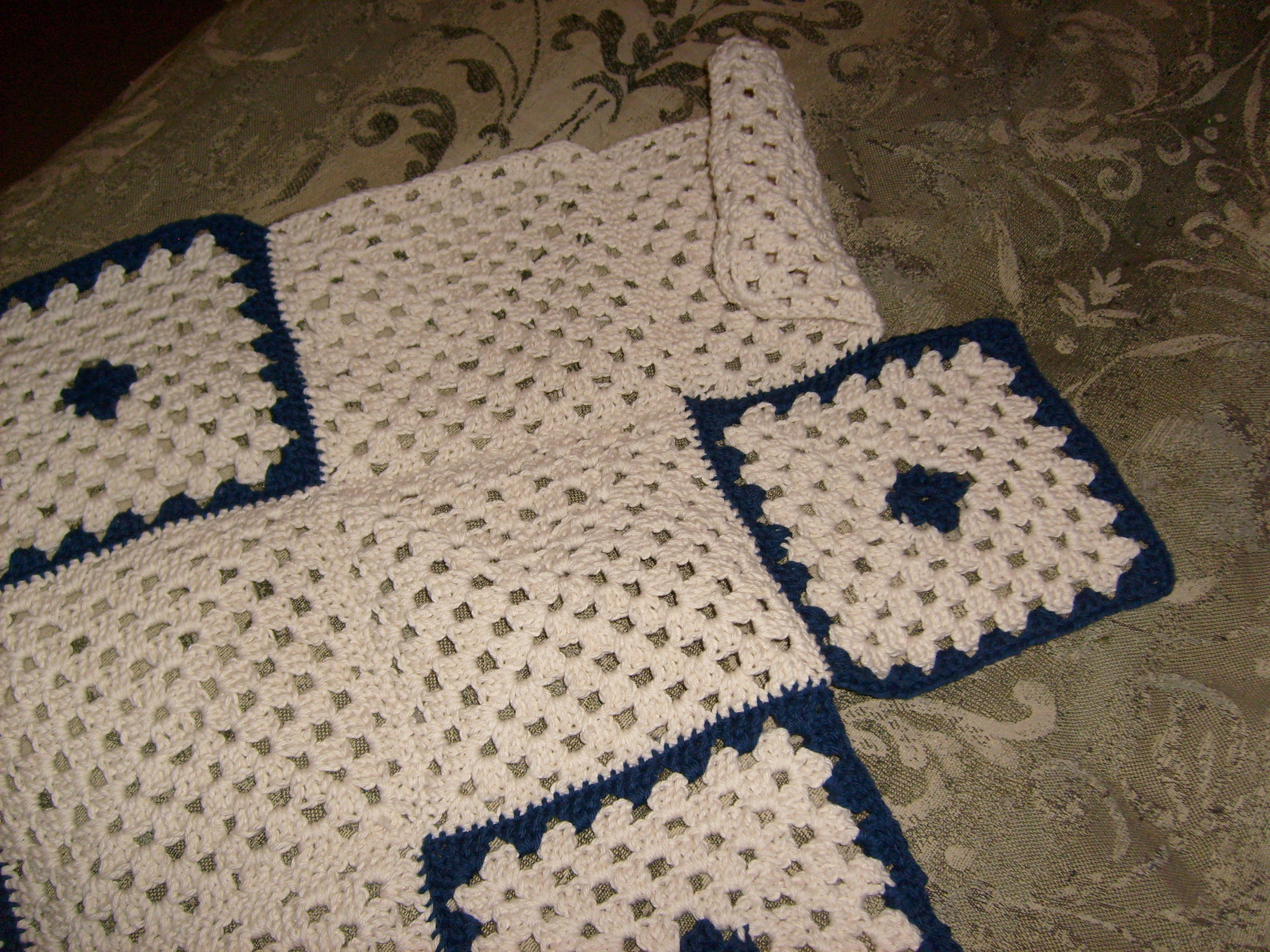
An Afghan blanket of granny squares during piecework assembly

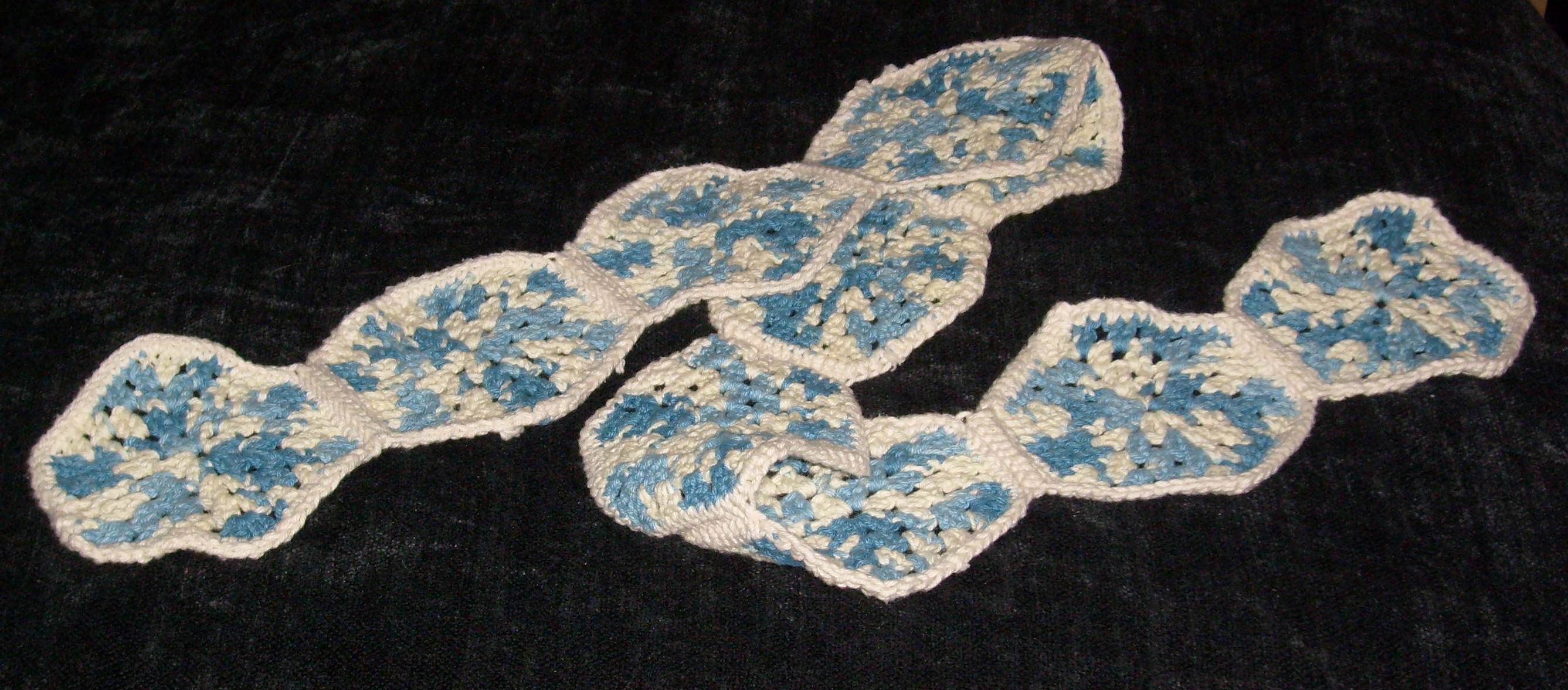
A scarf made from granny stitch hexagons in mixed color cotton yarn bordered with ecru

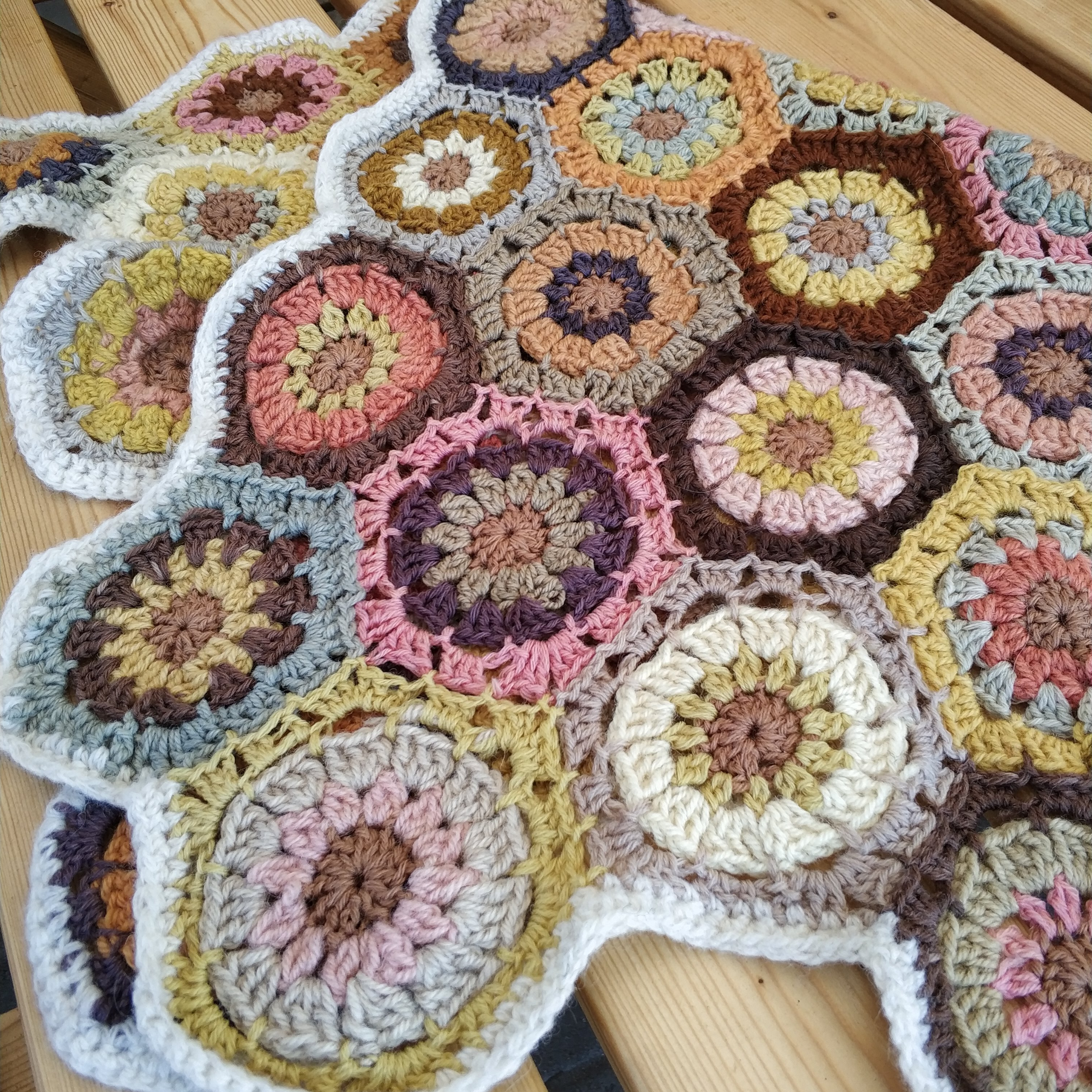
Blanket made of granny stitch hexagons

According to Edie Eckman in The Crochet Answer Book,

The familiar granny square is a special form of square motif. Although there are many variations on the granny square, the traditional one is a double-crocheted square made with a series of chains and double-crocheted blocks—a kind of filet crochet in the round.

Any granny square begins with either a small loop of chain stitches, which will have a fixed diameter, or a "magic ring" slip knot, which can be pulled closed after crocheting into it. Basic granny squares alternate sets of double stitches and chain stitches. Variant patterns use different stitch types or produce other geometric shapes such as hexagons. In order to achieve a distinct angle at the corners, the designer uses extra chain stitches. Subsequent rounds are added by wrapping multiple stitches around the existing chain stitches. Hundreds of variant motifs are in use, and entire books have been devoted to granny square designs.
