= Log Cabin (quilt block) =

American quilt block

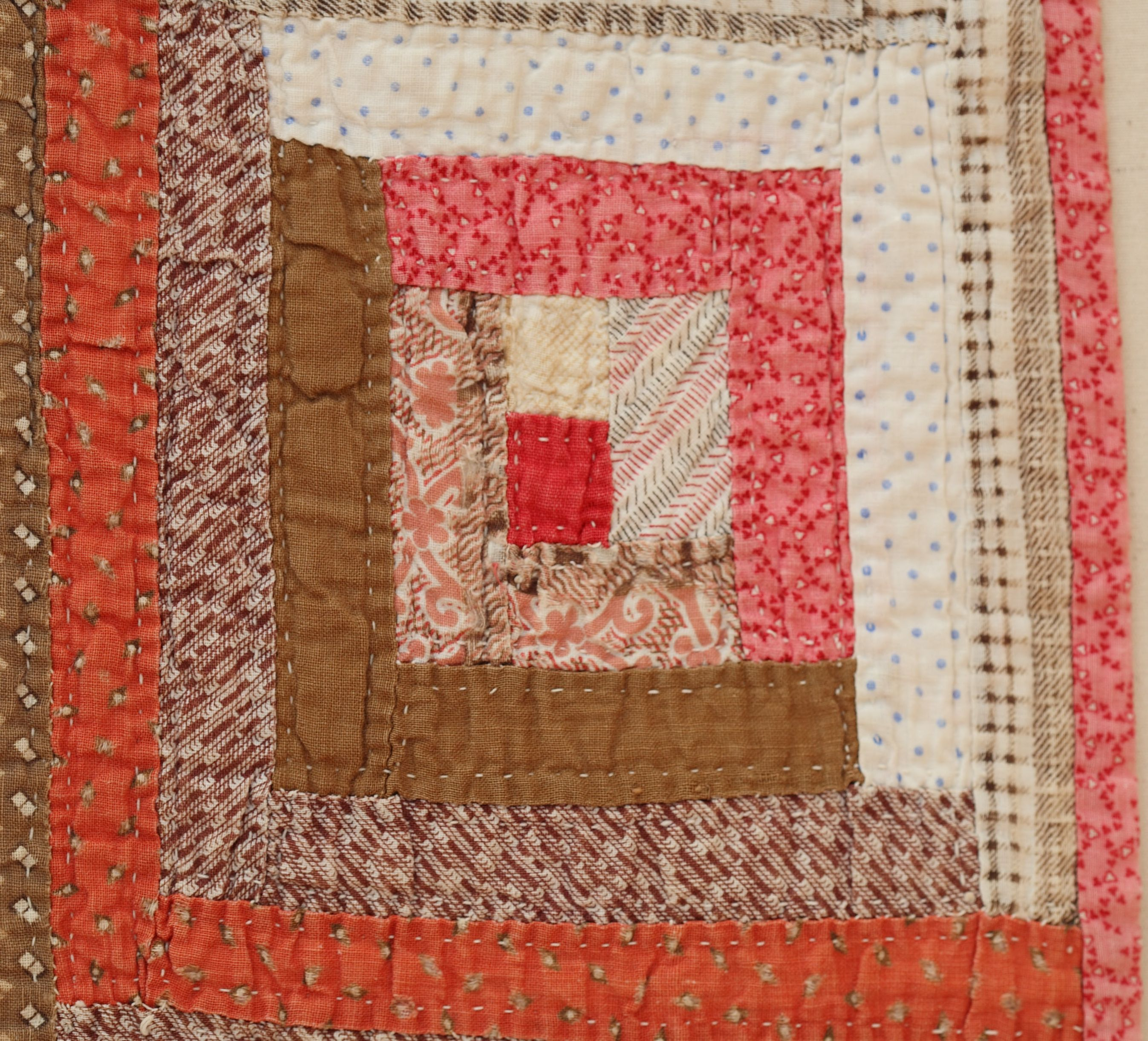
Log cabin quilt square made by Janet Reed in Monroe County, Indiana in 1880

The Log Cabin quilt block is a North American pieced quilt pattern where narrow strips of fabric surround a central square. Usually, the block is bisected diagonally, with one half using lighter colors than the other half. Sometimes the shading is not diagonal, but in alternating rectangles. Traditionally, the rectangles represent logs in a log cabin, while the central square (often red) represents the hearth. Log Cabin blocks have at least three rows of "logs", but can have more.

== History ==
When English paper piecing started to become popular in America the 19th century, certain block patterns began to be called by different names. Names were not standard, but 20th-century quilt pattern books chose names for blocks while acknowledging they could be known by other names. One popular pattern was the Log Cabin. Log Cabin quilts were mentioned in print as early as 1863, with archival examples dating back to 1874. Log Cabin quilts in the 19th century were popular enough to have their own county fair prize category. To support the Union Army, Log Cabin quilts were sold in fundraisers. The Log Cabin pattern expressed nostalgia for settler times when log cabins were more common. Additionally, log cabins were associated with Abraham Lincoln.

In the 1870s and 1880s, shades of brown were popular in quilts, while in the 1890s and 1910s, greys, blacks, and blues were common. By the 1930s, Log Cabin quilt designs went out of fashion until a revival of interest in older quilting patterns in the 1970s.

== Variations ==
One popular pattern was the Log Cabin. It had several variations. Two frequent variations were the Courthouse Steps and the Pineapple variation. In the Courthouse Steps variant, a vertical hourglass of rectangles contrasts with a horizontal hourglass of rectangles.

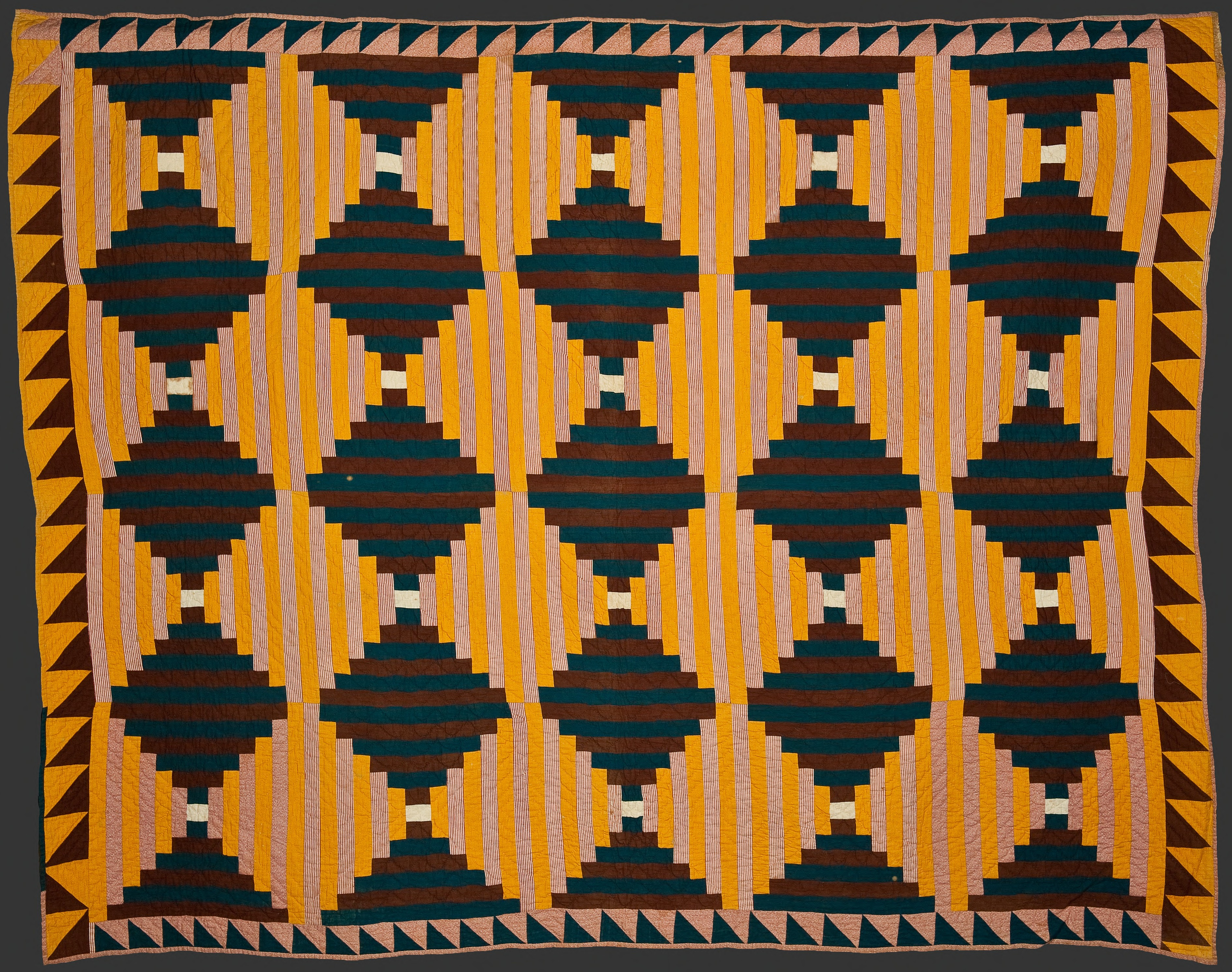
Courthouse steps variation. Quilt created in 1900. From the DPLA collection.

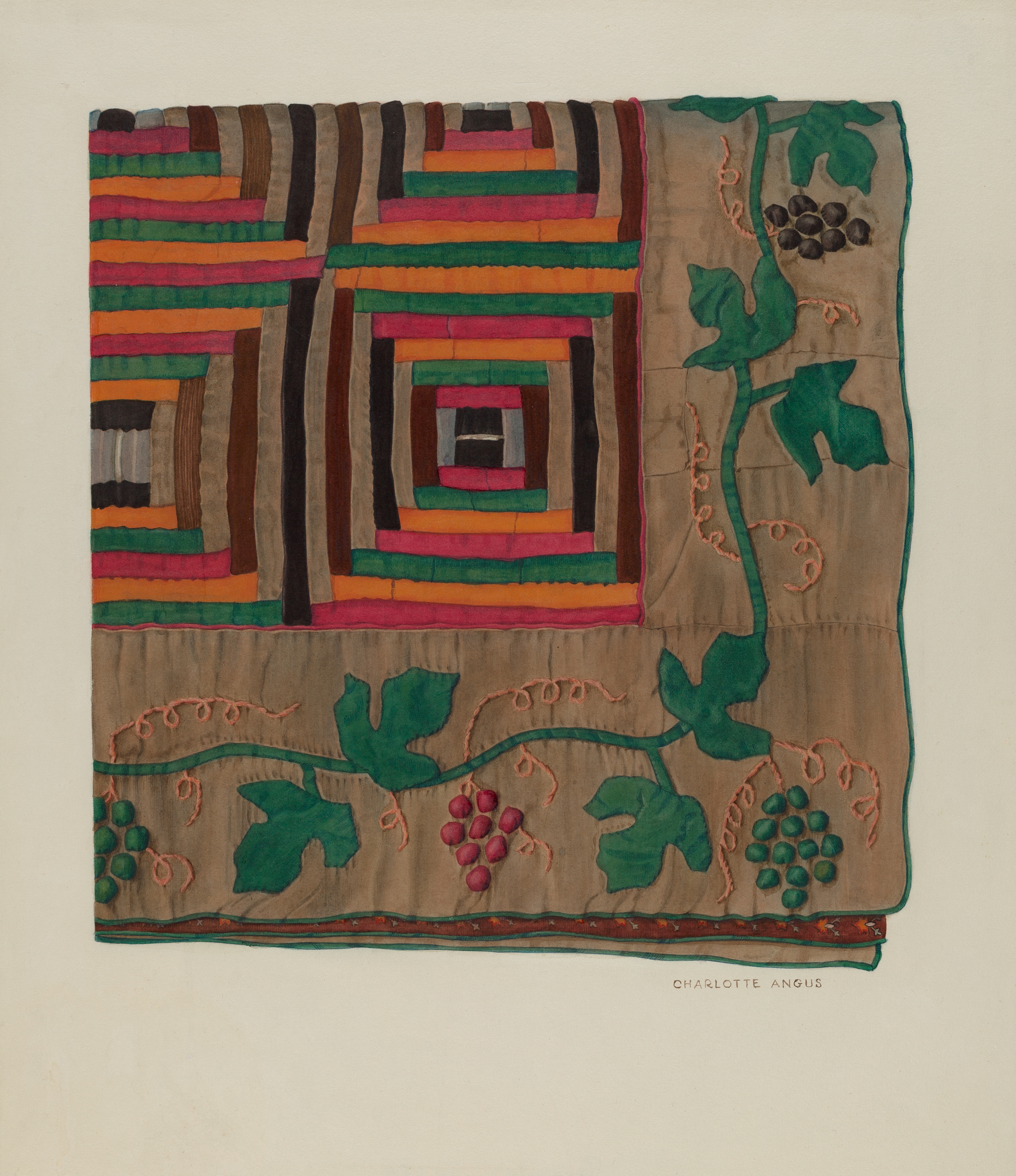
Charlotte Angus, courthouse steps variation. 1935-1942. From the National Gallery of Art.

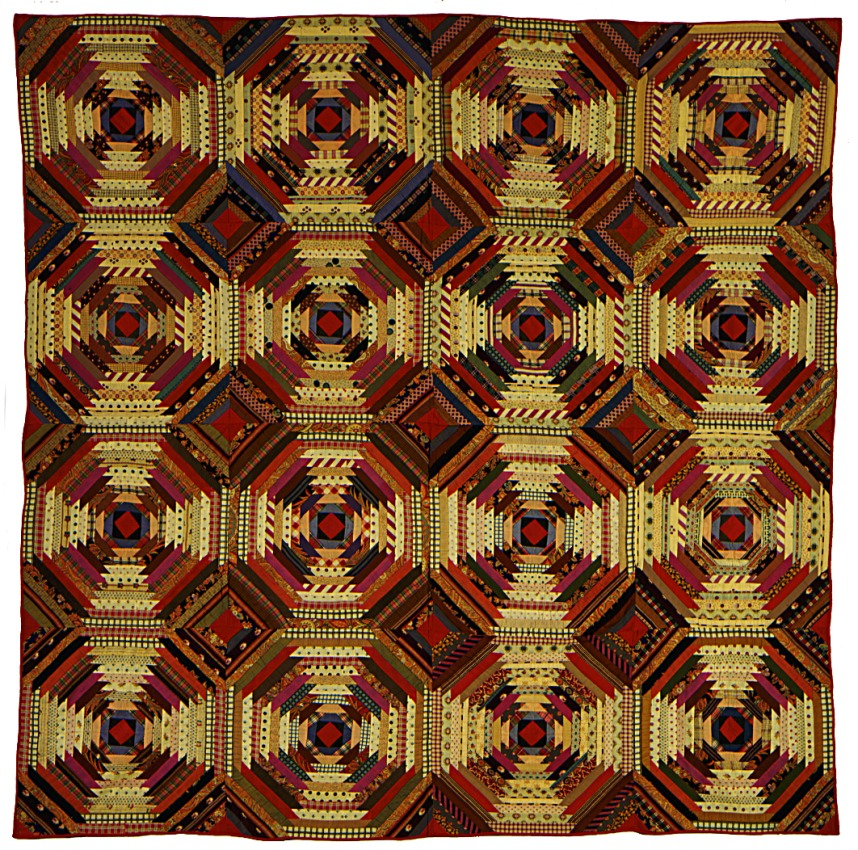
"Pineapple" variation made between 1870 and 1880. From the LA County Museum of Art.

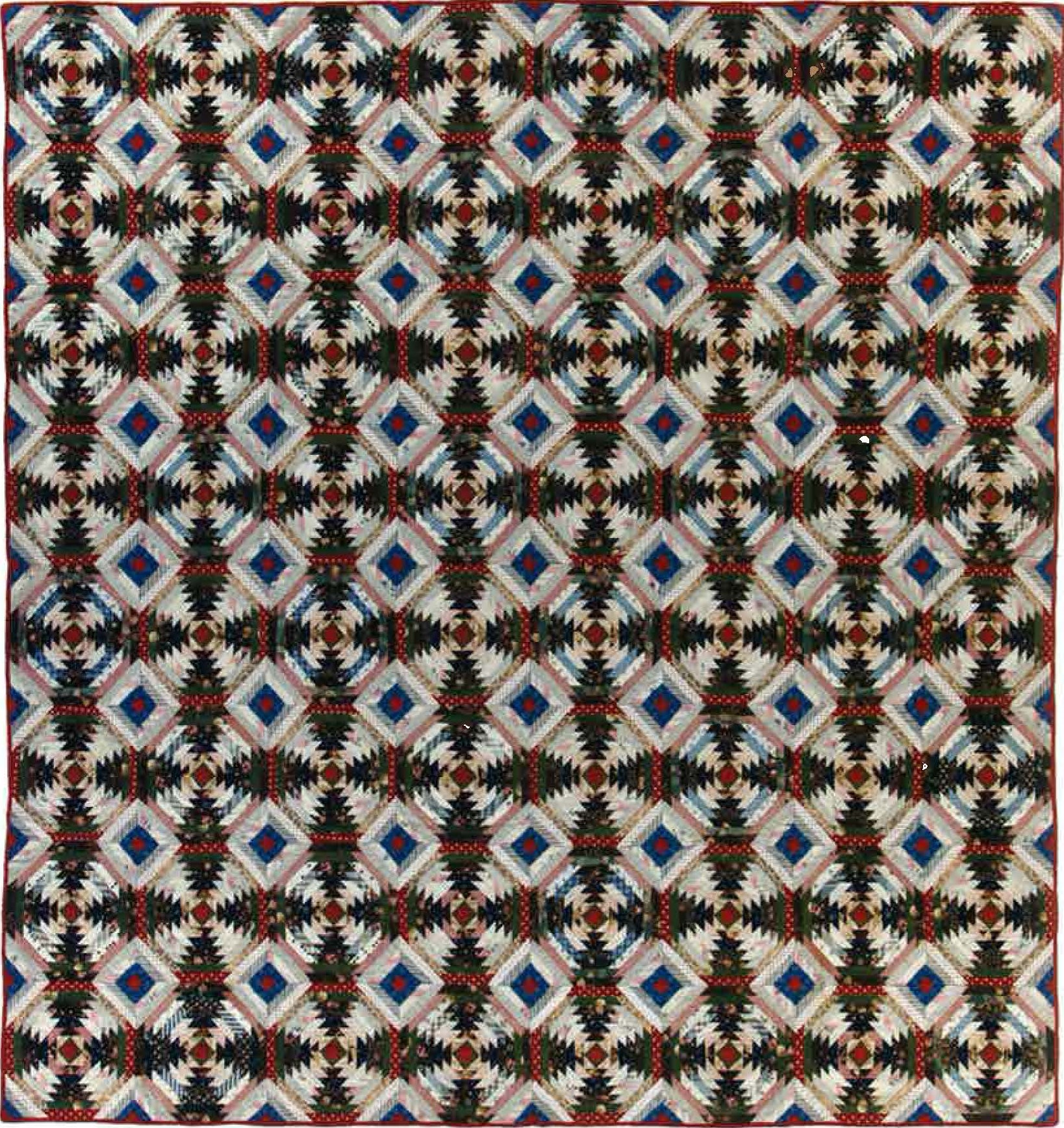
Quilt using the pineapple variation of the traditional Log Cabin square.

Kate Jackson, a Wasco woman, adapted the Log Cabin design into an arrowhead one to better fit Native American quilt aesthetic. In the American South, a variation on the log cabin design is called a Pig Pen or Medallion. In the Pig Pen design, the entire quilt is a series of larger and larger rectangles that nest inside each other.

== Settings ==
The positioning of light and dark fabrics within the pattern created various "settings" within the quilt itself (as termed by Crews and Ducey in their article on Log Cabin blocks). Log Cabin settings include:

- Straight Furrow setting: straight lines of dark alternate with lines of light fabric.
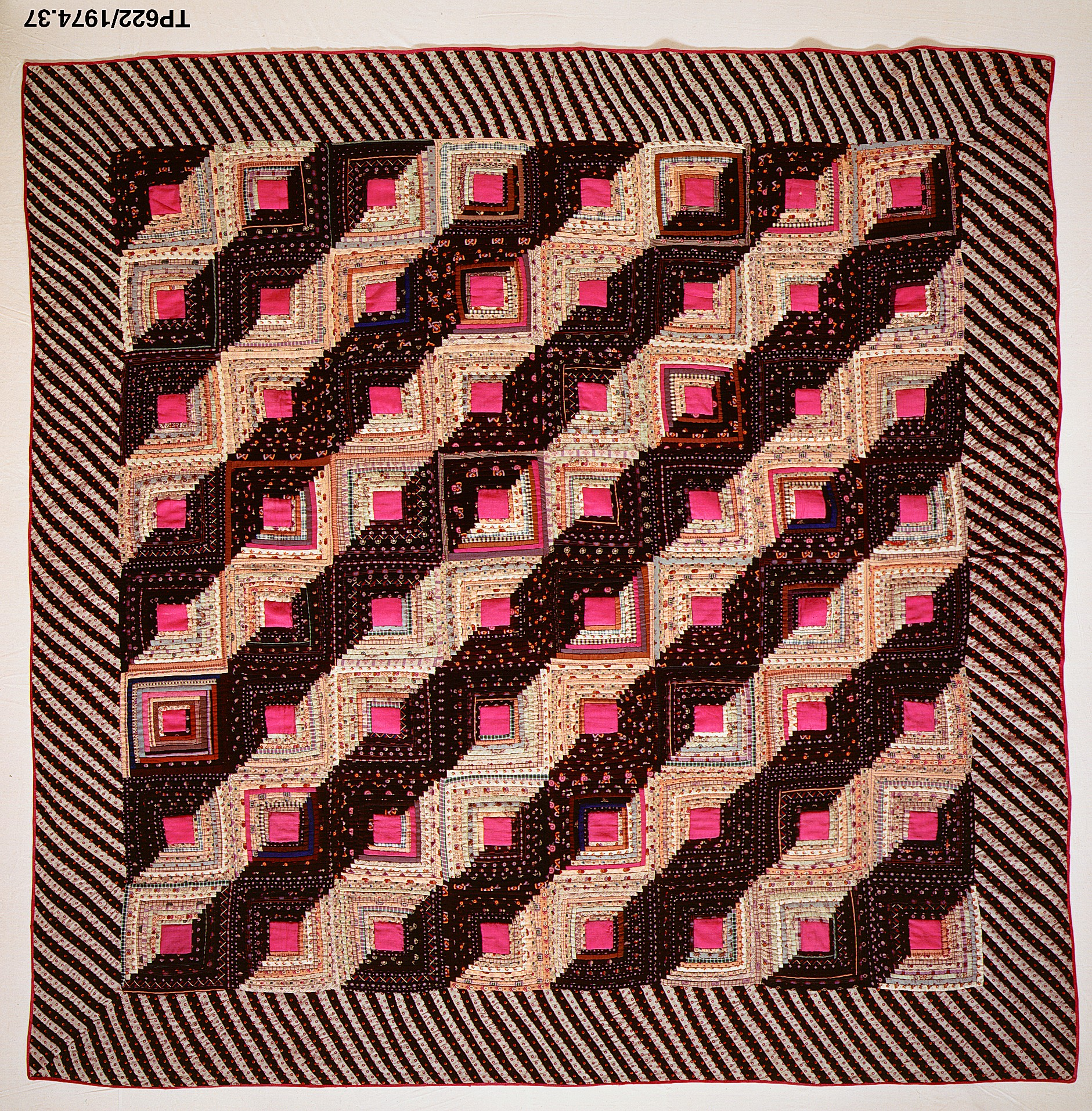
Straight Furrow setting, c. 1875. From the collection at the Met.
- Streak of Lightening: a zig-zag of alternating light and dark.
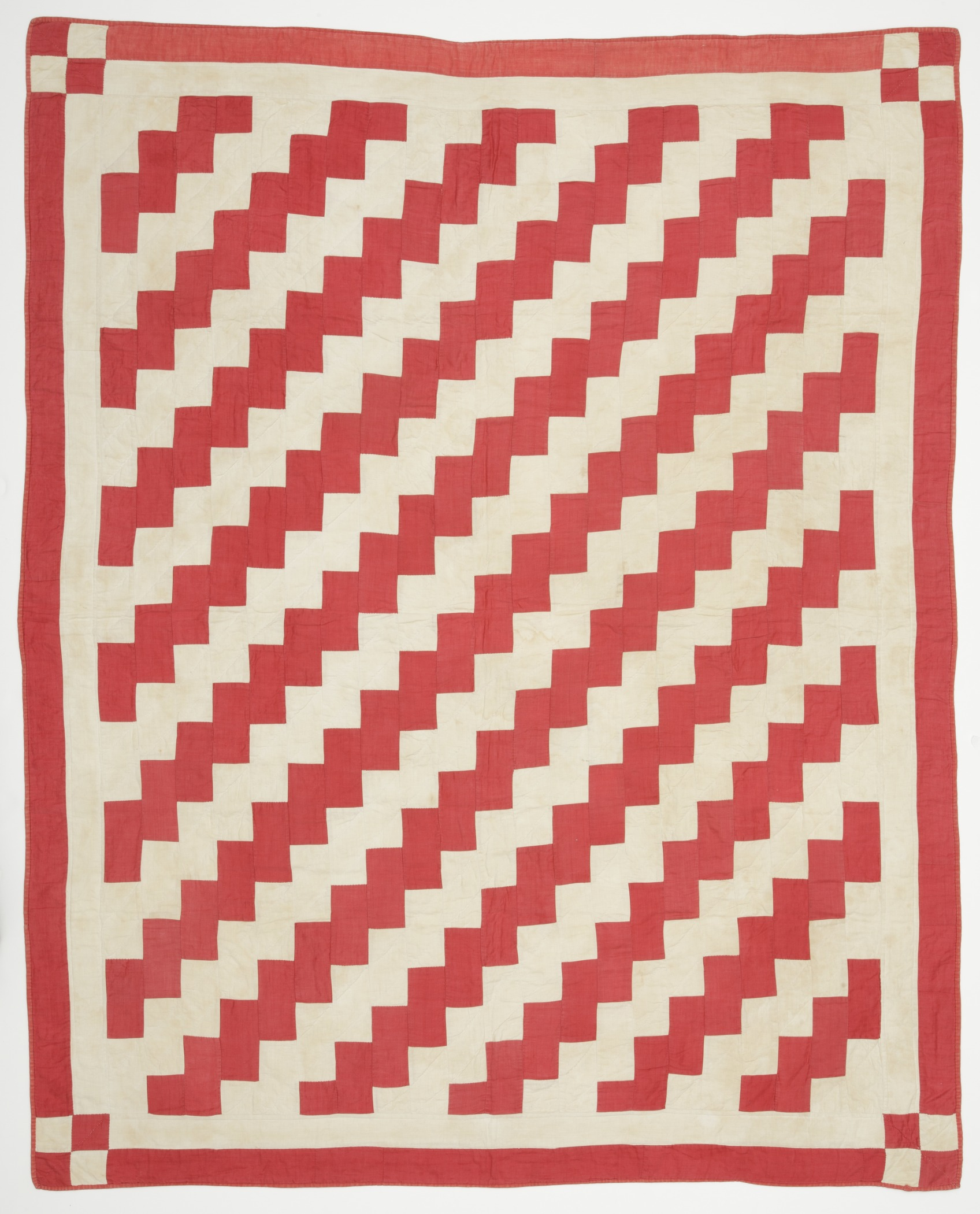
Streak of Lightning setting, c. 1880. From the LA County Museum of Art.
- Light and Dark: alternating light and dark diamonds.
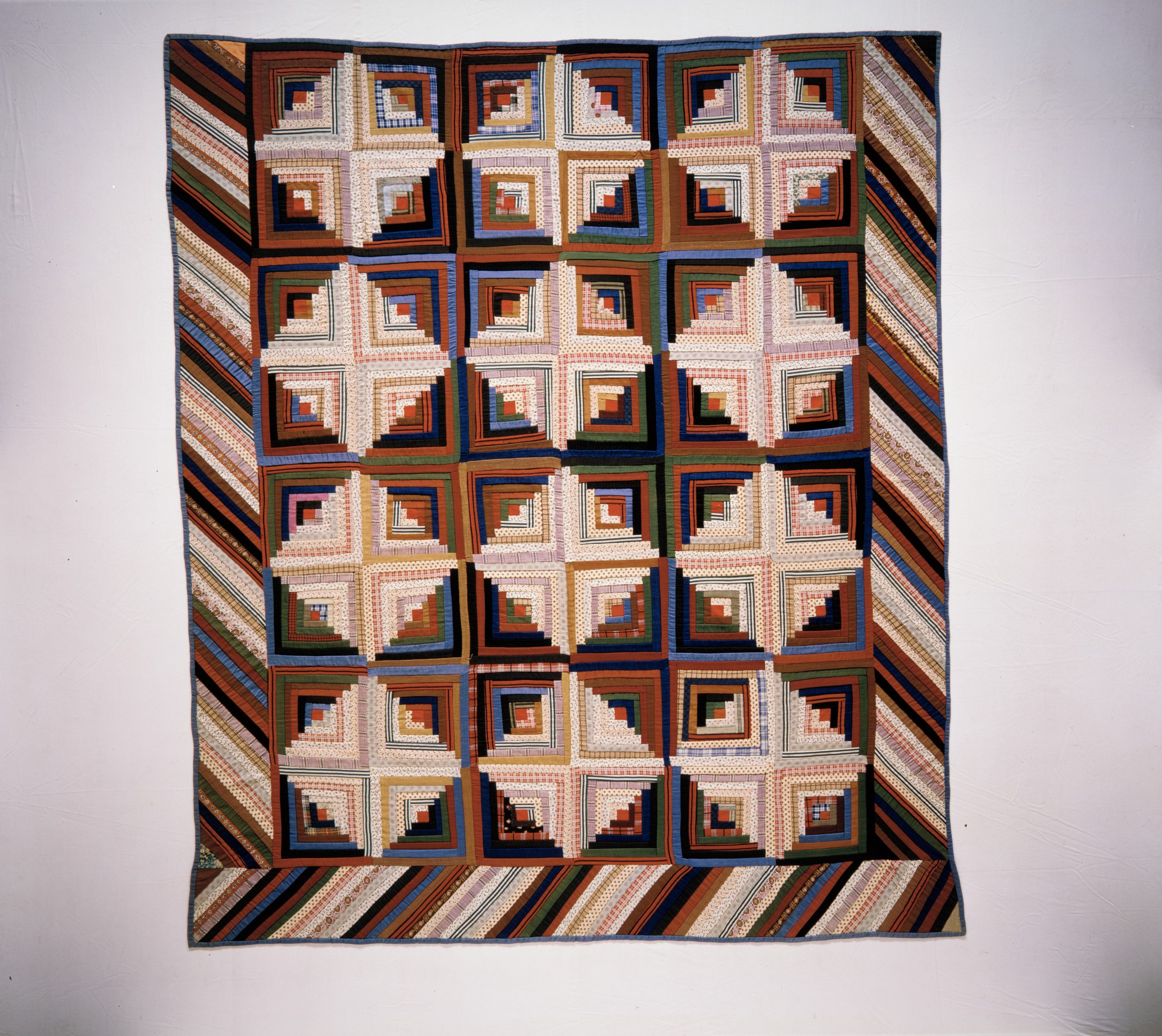
Light and Dark setting, c. 1875. From the collection at the Met.
- Chimney and Cornerstone: a light diamond with a dark diamond within it alternates with a dark diamond that has a light diamond within it.
- Sunshine and Shadow: repetition of blocks diagonally bisected, with the top triangle dark and the bottom triangle light.
- Barn Raising: a small central diamond is outlined in increasingly large diamonds alternating between light and dark.
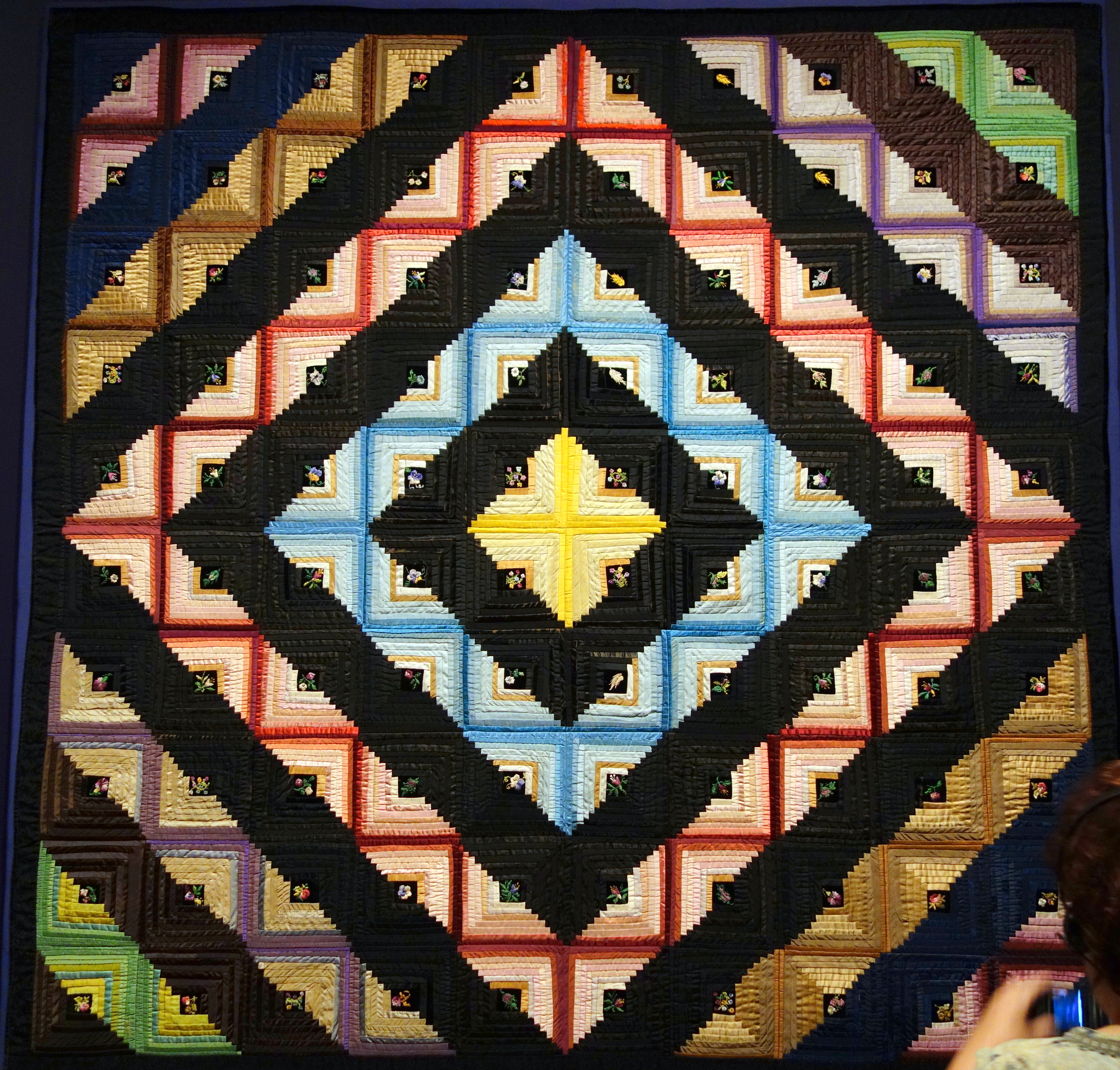
Barn Raising setting by Mrs. Herrick, Massachusetts, 1879. From the Museum of Fine Arts, Boston
- Chevron: an inversion of the Barn Raising setting, where V-shapes of alternating light and dark point towards the center from four directions.

== Log Cabin pattern in literature ==
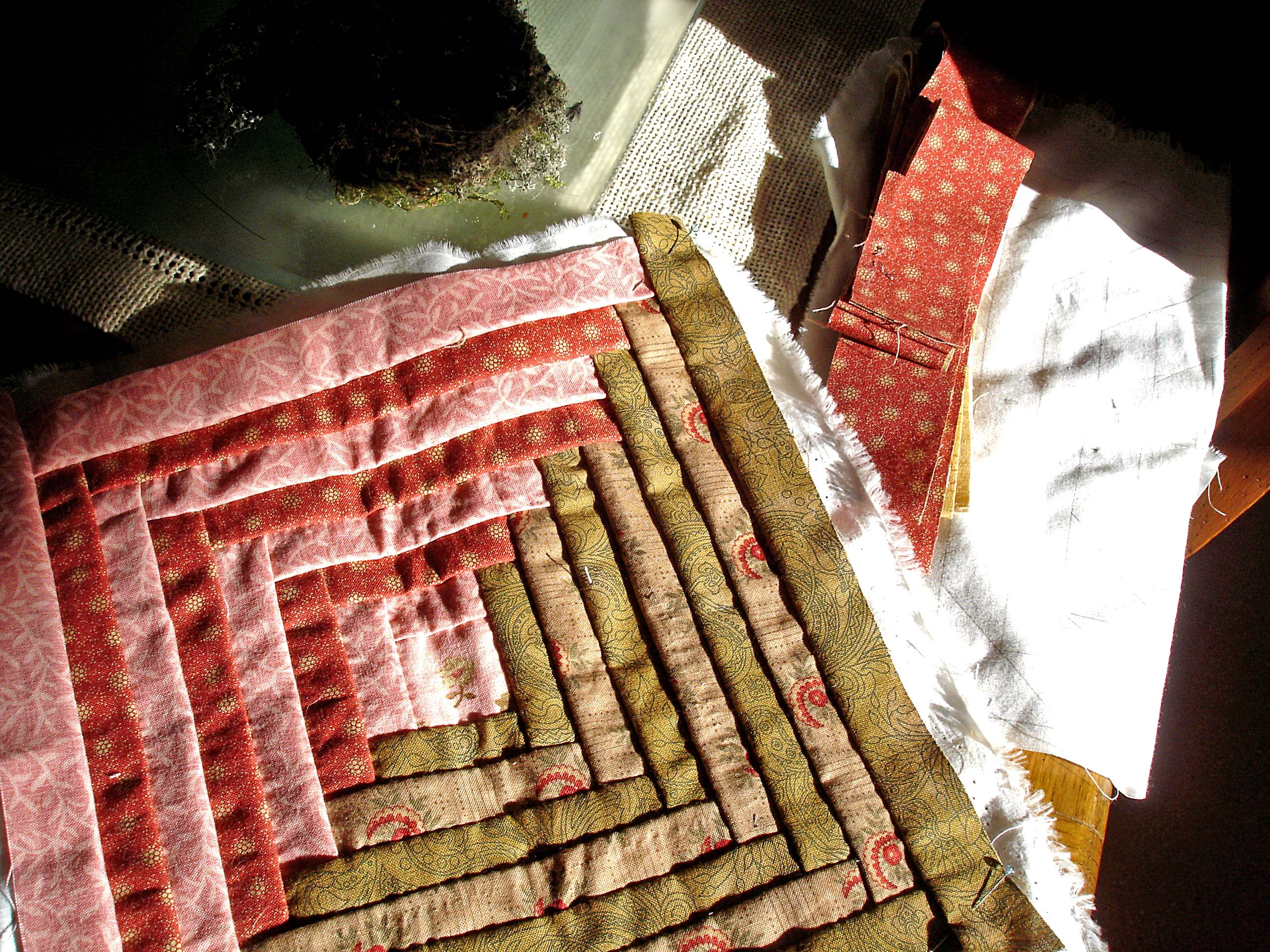
Log cabin quilt in progress

In Quilts As Text(iles): The Semiotics of Quilting, Elsley compares the format of her book with the form of a Log Cabin. Instead of alternating light and dark strips, she alternates readings of textiles in literature with discussions of contemporary quilt groups, which combine to form a larger vision of quilts as texts.

== Works cited ==
- Brackman, Barbara (18 July 2023). "A History of Log Cabin Quilts: The Building of an American Classic". Quilting Daily.
- Crews, Patricia Cox; Ducey, Carolyn (2009). "Building on a Foundation: Log Cabin Quilts". In Hanson, Marin F.; Crews, Patricia Cox (eds.). American Quilts in the Modern Age 1870-1940. University of Nebraska Press. p. 90. ISBN 9780803220546.
- Elsley, Judy (1996). Quilts as text(iles): the semiotics of quilting. New York: P. Lang. ISBN 0820428086.
- Kiracofe, Roderick; Huff, Mary Elizabeth Johnson (1993). The American quilt: a history of cloth and comfort, 1750-1950. New York: Clarkson Potter. ISBN 0517575353.
- MacDowell, Marsha L.; Dewhurst, C. Kurt, eds. (1997). To honor and comfort: native quilting traditions. Santa Fe, N.M: Museum of New Mexico Press in association with Michigan State University Museum. ISBN 0890133174.
