= Bertha Corbett Melcher =

American illustrator and creator of the sunbonnet babies

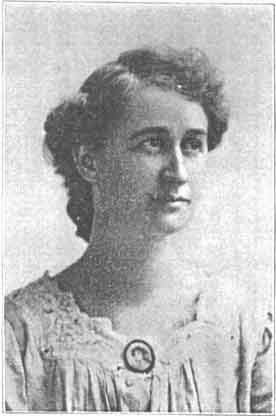
- Born: 8 February 1872; Denver
- Died: 8 June 1950

Bertha Corbett Melcher (8 February 1872 — 8 June 1950) was an American illustrator best known for her drawings of the characters the sunbonnet babies.

== Early life ==
Corbett was born Bertha Louise Corbett on 8 February 1872 in Denver. Both her father and grandfather were sign painters. The family moved to Minneapolis in the 1880s.

She studied at Chicago's School of Normal and Applied Art, with Howard Pyle at Drexel University, and with Douglas Volk in Minneapolis. Her first job was as a newspaper illustrator in Minneapolis. There, she established an illustration studio.

== Sunbonnet babies ==
Although Corbett drew a wide variety of subjects, she drew none as often as the sunbonnet babies. Corbett drew the first sunbonnet babies in 1897. Their origins are disputed. According to some accounts, they arose out of a challenge from a fellow artist to create faceless characters; according to others, Corbett's mother told her to cover up complicated faces with bonnets. Nevertheless, the illustrations became incredibly popular, and she self-published a book about their adventures in 1899. Corbett reportedly had to keep 15 people employed to color her illustrations and keep up with demand.

A few years later, in 1905, Corbett added the characters named "the Overall Boys" to her repertoire.

In 1908, Corbett began giving “chalk talks” — drawing demonstrations for organizations like the Santa Fe Railroad, women's clubs, schools, and libraries. Occasionally, she would collaborate with other artists, like Maud Pratt Crane and Carrie Jacobs-Bond. While in California, Corbett submitted her art to a Los Angeles exhibition, catching the attention of her future husband, George Henry Melcher, who publicly complimented the work.

Inspired by her friend Richard Outcault, Corbett licensed the characters and created a comic strip for them. The sunbonnet babies became quickly popular in the quilting and embroidery community.

Selected images of the sunbonnet babies

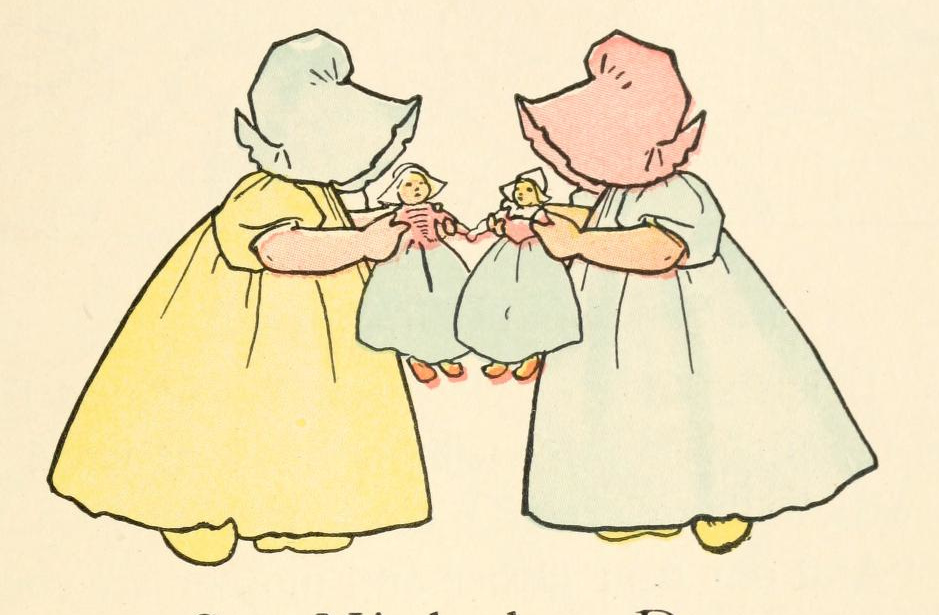

== Personal life ==
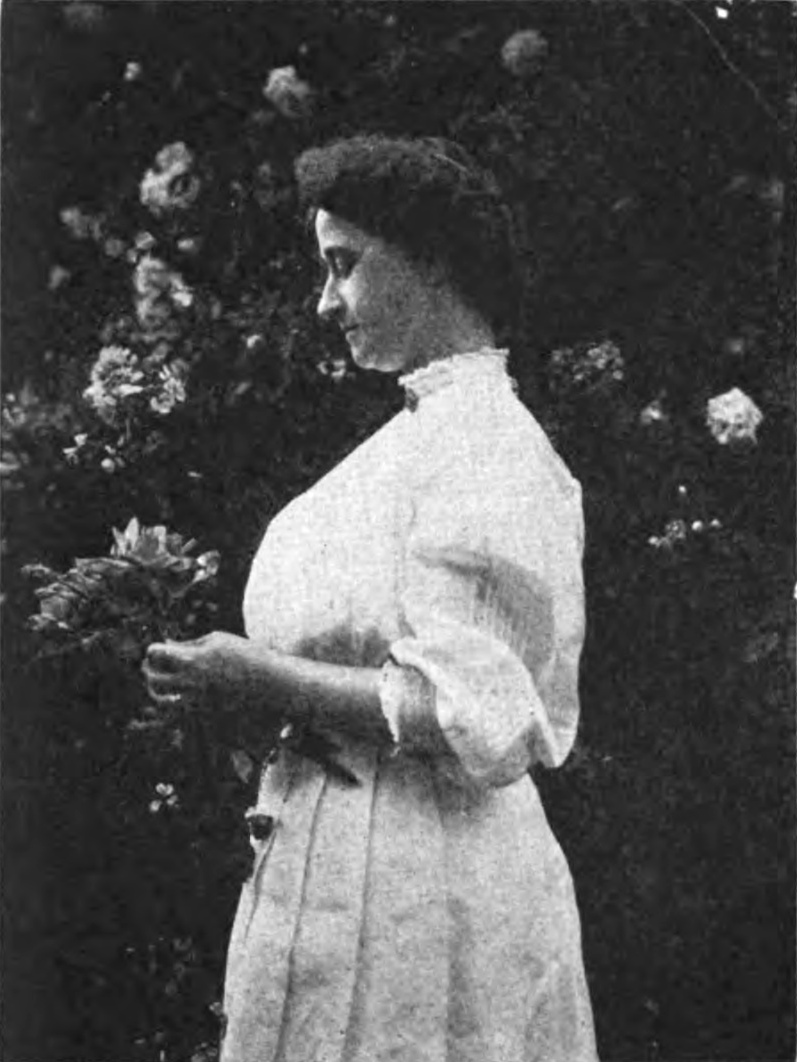
Corbett Melcher in 1917

At the age of 38, Corbett met George Henry Melcher in person for the first time. They married after only a few weeks, on August 5, 1910, and moved together to Topanga, California. On May 3, 1911, they had a daughter, Charlotte Roseneath Melcher. Their second daughter, Ruth Corbett Melcher, was born in 1915.

On January 8, 1924, Corbett filed for divorce from Melcher, citing verbal abuse, but the divorce was not seen through until 1933, when Corbett went to live with her sister and daughter in West Hollywood.

== Selected works ==
- The Sun-Bonnet Babies (1900)
- The Sunbonnet Babies in Holland (1915)
- What’s on the Air (1928)
- The Overall Boys in Switzerland: A Second Reader (1916) — Illustrations
