= Afghan (blanket) =

Type of blanket

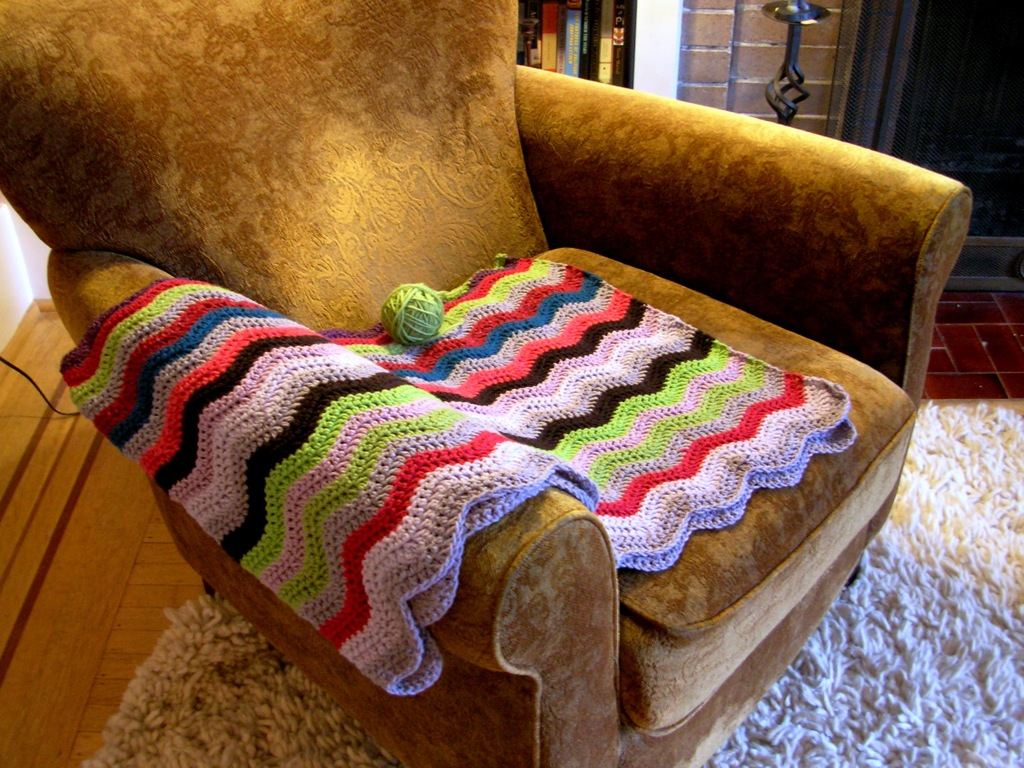
- An afghan blanket made using the ripple crochet stitch
- Type: Bedding
- Material: Wool
- Production method: Knitting or crocheting
- Production process: Handicraft
- Place of origin: Afghanistan

An afghan is a blanket or shawl, usually knitted or crocheted. It is sometimes also called a throw. Afghans are often used as bedspreads, or as a decoration on the back of couches or chairs.

== Etymology ==
The word afghan refers to the people of Afghanistan. The use of afghan in the English language for a textile object goes back to at least 1831, when Thomas Carlyle mentioned "Afghan shawls" in his Sartor Resartus. By 1860, Afghan as a noun, not an adjective, denoted a type of handicrafted object shown at state fairs and other exhibitions, along with patchwork and knitted quilts, and was being mentioned in novels:

There is a fashion, I observe, in these things; and her work was a sort I perceive to have become very fashionable of late—the netting of soft wools into various articles for women's heads and shoulders, and even into cloaks and large shawls or blankets—Afghans, Lilly says they call them—to be worn as protection against dust in summer drives.

== History ==
The Afghan blankets and shawls may have roots in the rich textile tradition of Afghanistan which consisted of geometric designs made with many crocheted or knitted squares of yarn sewn together into a fabric.

== Types and styles ==
There are many styles of afghans:

- Single-piece afghans are the simplest style to make and are especially popular with beginners.
- Mile-a-minute afghans are usually made in many separate strips, with a minimum of stitches per strip, and then the strips are joined.

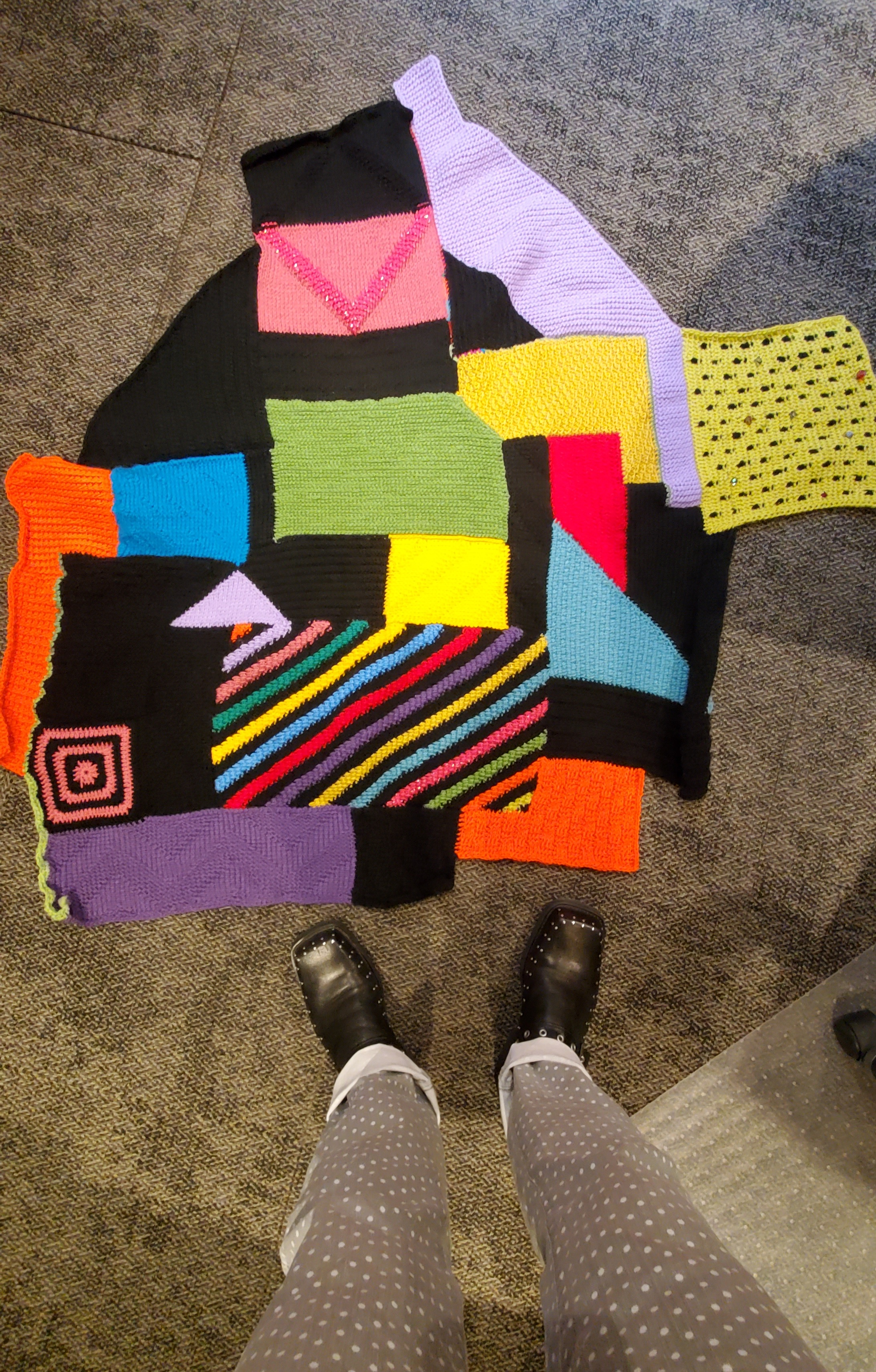
Colourful Tunisian crochet afghan work in progress, showing join-as-you-go method of adding pieces

- Join-as-you-go afghans are made up of many different pieces, one of which begins where the last leaves off.
- Motif afghans are composed of many small motifs, squares, or blocks, such as a granny square. These motifs may be all of the same design or of different designs. However, to make it easier to join the motifs into an afghan, the blocks are typically the same size. Some favor the motif style because of its portability and versatility of design. The motif style is still a very popular and a complex design for making blankets, scarves, etc. Although not a requirement, an edge or border is most often added to nicely finish off the blanket.
- A graphghan is an afghan made by following a flat chart. This method uses a grid of colored squares to create a visual design. There are three main methods to making a graphghan: pixel crochet, corner-to-corner crochet, and tapestry crochet.
