= 9-slice scaling =

2D image resizing technique

Top: Traditional scaling, corners are distorted. Bottom: 9-slice scaling, corners aren't distorted. Corner pieces (1, 3, 7, and 9) are not scaled, vertical edges (2 and 8) are scaled only horizontally, horizontal edges (4 and 6) are scaled only vertically, and the center piece (5) is scaled both horizontally and vertically.

9-slice scaling (also known as Scale 9 grid, 9-slicing or 9-patch) is a 2D image resizing technique to proportionally scale an image by splitting it into a grid of nine parts.

The key idea is to prevent image scaling distortion by protecting the pixels defined in 4 parts (corners) of the image and scaling or repeating the pixels in the other 5 parts.

A variation of the concept, the 3-slice scaling, consists of a grid of 3 parts in which only the pixels in 2 parts (the edges) are protected, and the pixels in the middle part are repeated.

== History and use ==
The concept was first introduced in a consumer application by Macromedia in Flash 8 (2005), and it was available as a feature to scale symbols. Later on, in 2007 Adobe introduced it as a feature in Adobe Fireworks CS3, Adobe Illustrator, and Adobe Flash. Today it is also present as a feature of game development software like Unreal Engine, Bevy, Urho3D, and Unity 3D.

The technique can be used to manipulate both bitmap/raster graphics and vector graphics. A current implementation of the 9-slice technique is present on the CSS 3 Backgrounds and Borders spec by using the border-image property.

== 27-slice scaling ==
The concept used in 9-slice scaling can be extended to 3D, which enables a more natural way of scaling certain 3D meshes. The number 27 is derived by splitting a cuboid into 3 sections on all 3 axes.

The general method of scaling remains the same, whereby the 8 corners of the cuboid do not scale, similar to the 4 corners present in 9-slice scaling. The central core scales in 3 dimensions. The 6 faces of the cuboid scale in 2 dimensions. The remaining 12 edge pieces scale in 1 dimension. All of which are relative to the actual scaling applied.

A functional implementation is done in Unity as a downloadable package.
