= List of North American pieced quilt patterns =

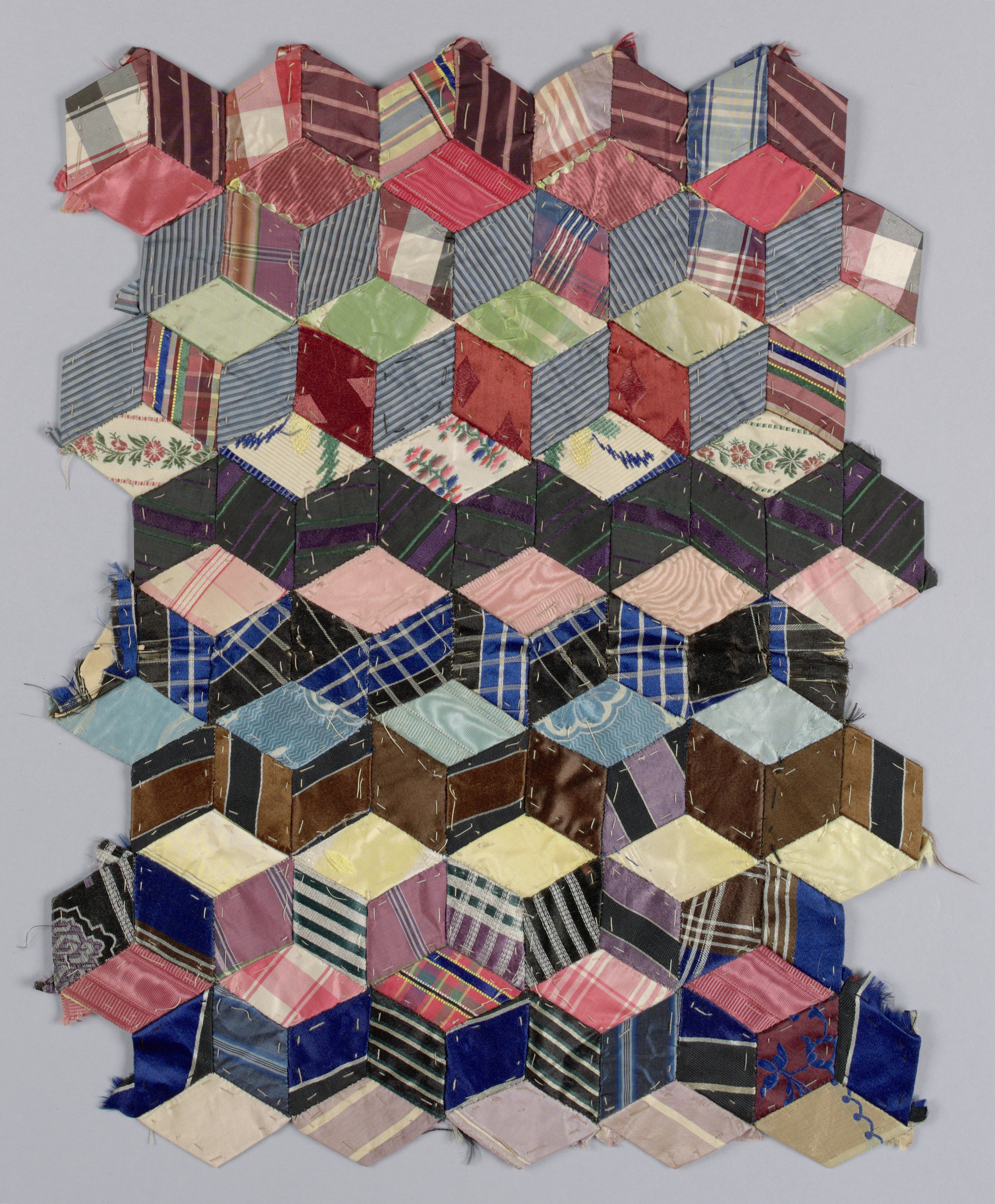
Tumbling Blocks pattern, assembled in the 1870s (Cooper Hewitt, Smithsonian Design Museum)

Patchwork quilts are made with patterns, many of which are common designs in North America.

- Anvil
- Basket
- Bear Paw
- Brick Work
- Churn Dash
- Corn and Beans
- Dogwood and Sunflower
- Double Wedding Ring
- Dove in the Window
- Dresden Plate
- Drunkard's Path
- Eight-Pointed Star
- Four Patch
- Hen and Chickens
- God's Eye
- Grandmother's Flower Garden
- Kansas Star (also called Kansas City Star, after the newspaper that published them)
- Liberty Star Block
- Lincoln Platform
- Log Cabin
- Nebraska Pinwheel
- Nebraska State Block
- Nine Patch
- Pinwheel
- Roman Square
- Roman Stripe
- Rose of Sharon, or Whig Rose
- School House
- Sunbonnet babies
- Tumbling blocks
- Wild Goose Chase

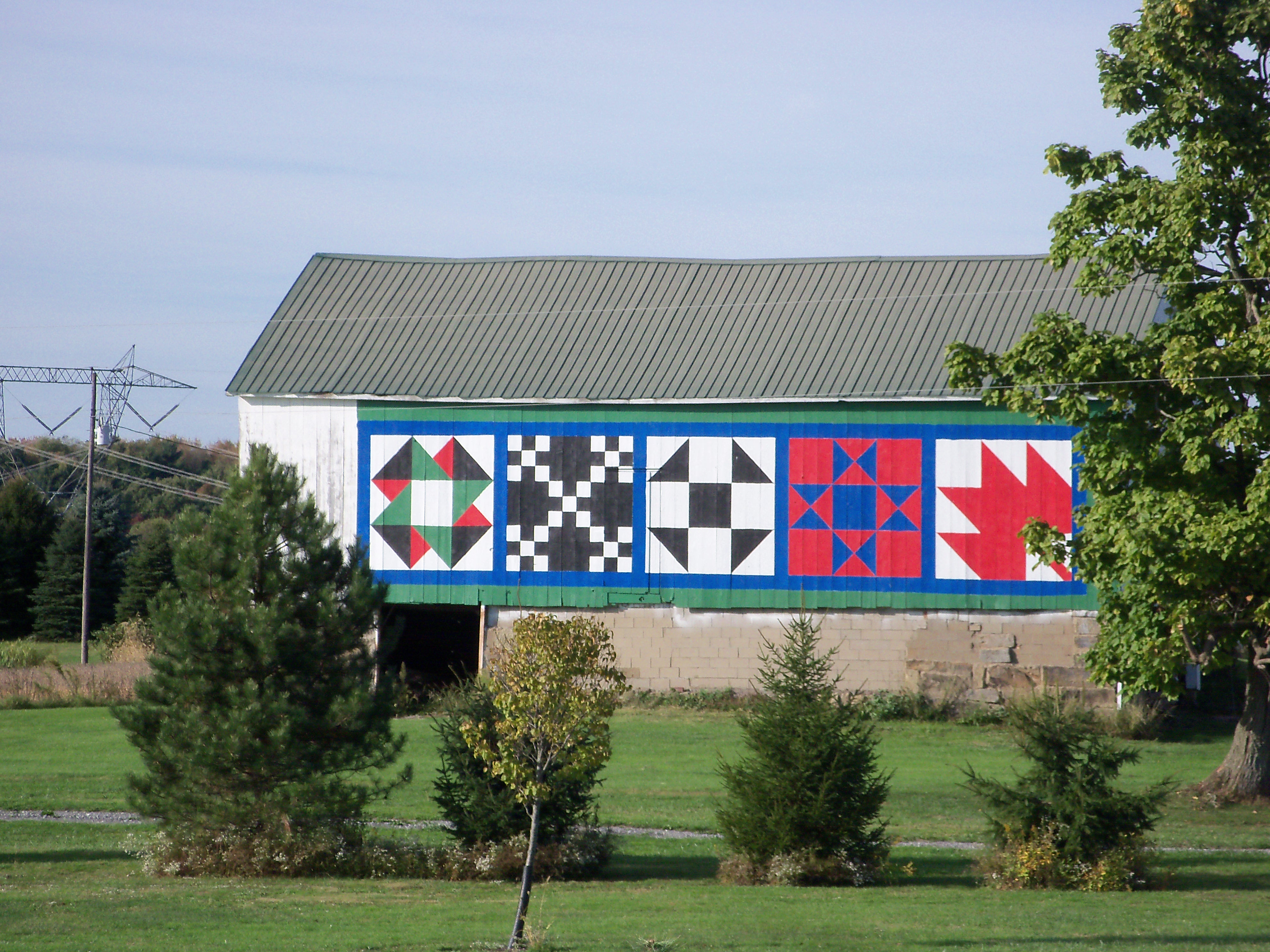
Quilt blocks on bank barn: Camelot Star, Irish Chain Block, Shoo Fly Block, Ohio Star and Maple Leaf Block

== See also ==
- Motif (textile arts)
- Pattern (sewing)
