= Motif (textile arts) =

Recurring component of a larger design

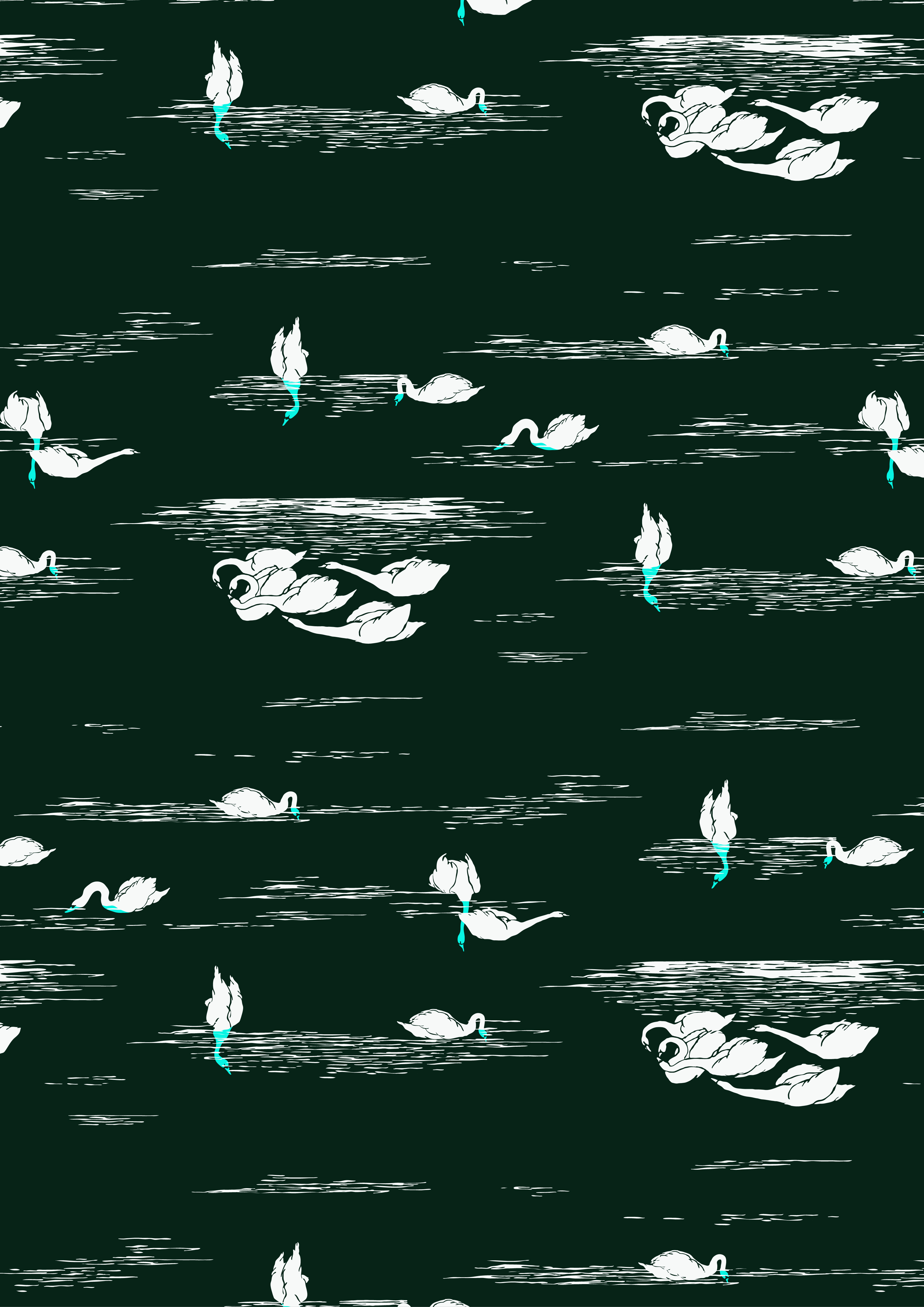
Motif textile réalisé sur Illustrator CS6 en 2016 par Claire Laurent (France)

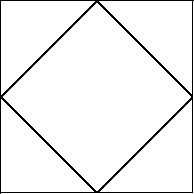
Square-in-a-square quilt block pattern

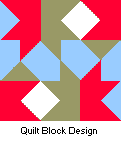
Kitchen kaleidoscope quilt block example

In the textile arts, a motif (also called a block or square) is a smaller element in a much larger work. In knitting and crochet, motifs are made one at a time and joined together to create larger works such as afghan blankets or shawls. An example of a motif is the granny square. Motifs may be varied or rotated for contrast and variety, or to create new shapes, as with quilt blocks in quilts and quilting. Contrast with motif-less crazy quilting.

Motifs can be any size, but usually all the motifs in any given work are the same size. The patterns and stitches used in a motif may vary greatly, but there is almost always some unifying element, such as texture, stitch pattern, or colour, which gives the finished piece more aesthetic appeal. Motifs may commemorate events or convey information or political slogans. For example, the individual blocks of the AIDS Memorial Quilt, the possible Quilts of the Underground Railroad, and the "54-40 or Fight" quilt block.

== See also ==
- Quilt § Block designs
- List of notable North American quilt-block patterns
- Tessellation
