= Sunbonnet babies =

Fictional characters

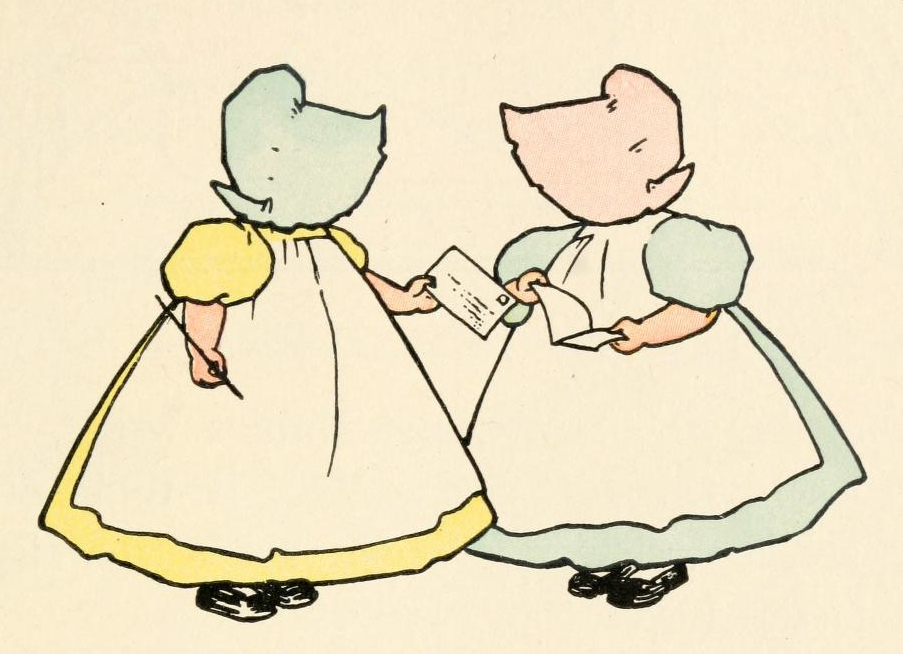
Illustration from The Sunbonnet Babies in Holland by Eulalie Osgood Grover (1915)

Sunbonnet Babies are characters created by commercial artist Bertha Corbett Melcher (1872–1950). Sunbonnet Babies featured two girls in pastel colored dresses with their faces covered by sunbonnets. Sunbonnet Babies appeared in books, illustrations and advertisements between the years of 1900 and 1930. Sunbonnet Babies were later used as a popular quilting pattern also known as Sunbonnet Sue. Melcher created a male version of the Sunbonnet Babies, named the 'Overall Boys' in 1905.

== History ==
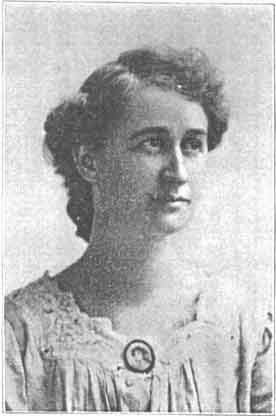
Bertha L. Corbett Melcher

Sunbonnet Babies were created by Bertha Corbett Melcher (1872–1950). Melcher was born in Denver and moved with her family to Minneapolis in the 1880s. Melcher attended art school in Minneapolis with plans to become a commercial artist. She may have also studied with Howard Pyle. By the 1920s, Melcher had moved to Topanga, California.

Melcher started drawing the Sunbonnet Babies in 1897. The origin of the signature style of the faces being covered by sunbonnets is contested by different members of Melcher's family and by Melcher herself. In an interview, Melcher's brother said their mother suggested Bertha avoid the difficulty of drawing faces by covering them with sunbonnets. Melcher herself said that covering faces allowed her to communicate with body position. Melcher has also said that the design came about in "answer to a friend’s challenge to convey emotion without a face."

Melcher published her first book, The Sun-Bonnet Babies in 1900. Later, she shopped her illustrations to publisher Rand McNally of Chicago, and nine subsequent books were written by Eulalie Osgood Grover and illustrated by Bertha Corbett. In 1905, Melcher wrote The Overall Boys. Many of these books were used as primers and used widely in primary schools in the midwest.

Melcher used the sunbonnet babies in advertising and later established the Sunbonnet Babies Company. She started a studio to illustrate and create merchandise of the Sunbonnet Babies. The characters also appeared in a comic strip.

== Quilting ==
Melcher herself did not originate the use of the sunbonnet babies as quilting pattern. The Sunbonnet Babies quilting pattern appeared in textile art 1910's in the Ladies' Home Journal 1911–1912 in a quilt stitched by Marie Webster. The pattern was popular during the Great Depression. In the American South, it was often known as "Dutch Doll" until the 1970s. There was also a quilt pattern based on the "Overall Boys," known by the various names including “Overall Bill, “Overall Andy,” “Sunbonnet Sam,” “Suspender Sam,” “Fisherman Jim." Many patterns for quilts and sewing were designed by Ruby Short McKim and published in nationally syndicated newspapers.

Sunbonnet Sue became symbolic of 'female innocence and docility'. Linda Pershing collected accounts from women quilters who depicted 'Sues' doing activities such as smoking, wearing more revealing clothing, and subverting feminine stereotypes. In 1979, the “Seamsters Union Local #500," a group of quilters from Lawrence, Kansas, created “The Sun Sets on Sunbonnet Sue," a quilt depicting the character murdered in a variety of ways.

== Collectibles ==
Sunbonnet Babies merchandise includes school books, valentines cards, postcards, china, and quilts.

Sunbonnet Babies were adapted into three dimensional porcelain collectibles and pottery made by Royal Bayreuth Company in the early 1900s. The Royal Bayreuth China Company collection featured plates and figurines most popular were the days of the week series featuring the two Sunbonnet babies engaging in daily tasks of the week, similar to the material in the 1906 The Sunbonnet Babies at Work, at Play. The original series was manufactured in the early 1900s. A series was reissued in the 1970s.

== Books ==
- The Sun-Bonnet Babies – Bertha L. Corbett 1900
- The Sunbonnet Babies Book – Eulalie Osgood Grover and Bertha L. Corbett 1902
- The Sunbonnet Babies Primer – 1902
- The Overall Boys: a first reader – 1905
- The Sunbonnet Babies at Work, at Play – 1906
- The Sunbonnet Babies in Italy – 1922
- The Sunbonnet Babies in Mother Goose Land – 1927
- The Sunbonnet Babies A-B-C Book A Modern Horn Book – 1929
- The Sunbonnet Babies at Work at Play – 1906
- The Sunbonnet Babies in Holland – 1915
