= English paper piecing =

Fabric piecing technique

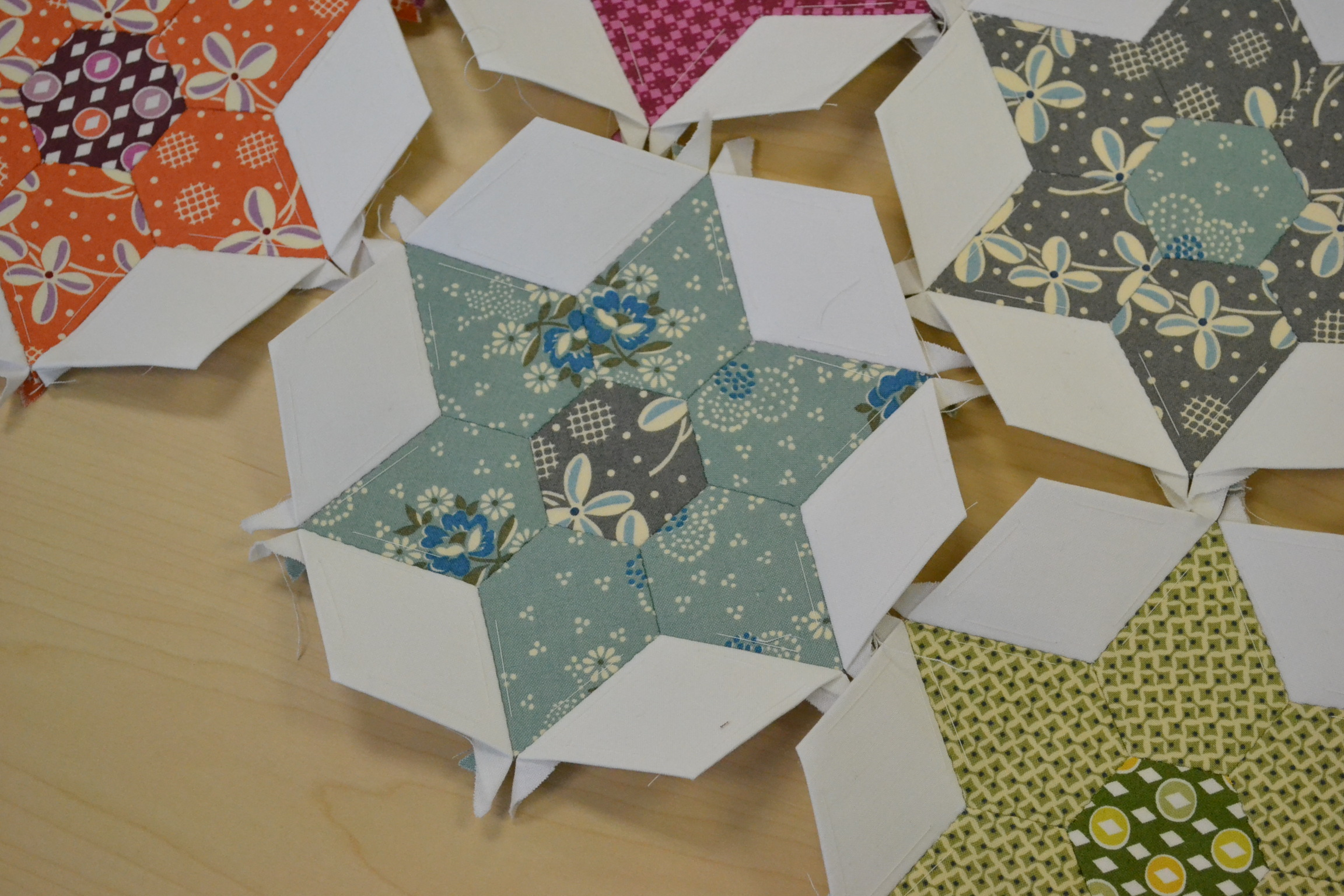
Star shapes made by paper piecing

English paper piecing is a method of patchwork where fabric is wrapped around shapes made of thin paper cardboard or heavy paper. Once the shapes are wrapped and ready, the sewer will hand sew the shapes together one at a time until the shapes become an intricate design. The paper or cardboard is removed once the shape has been sewn to another shape on all sides. This is an art for those who like to sew by hand.

The practice's name comes from the fact that it originated in England in the 1770s. Once a shape, bloc, rosette, or finished piece has been made, the papers are removed, leaving the fabric as the remaining item.

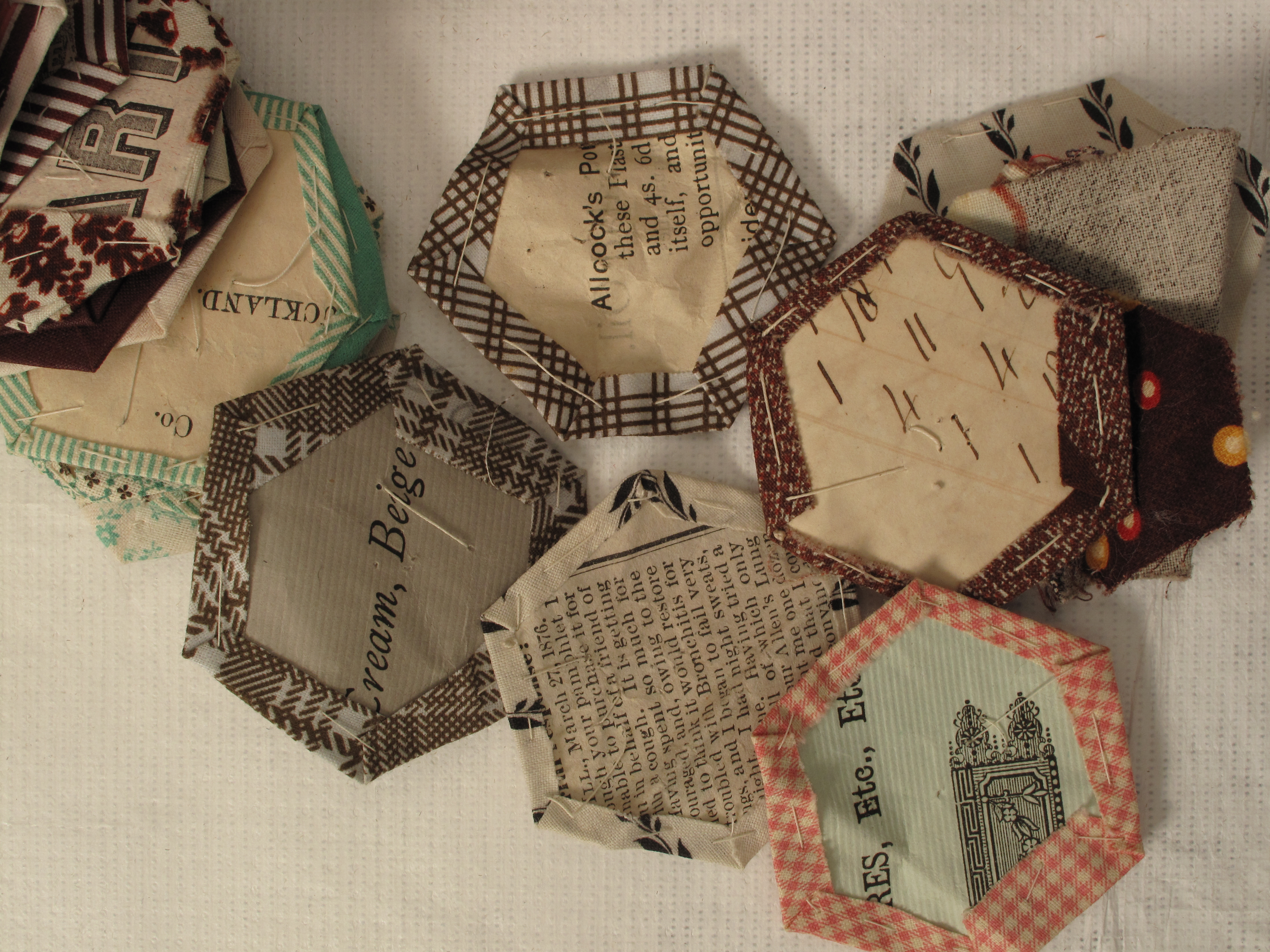
Backside of fabric pieces, shaped into hexagons by pieces of paper

English paper piecing should not be shortened to "paper piecing", as that term includes Foundation Paper Piecing (which uses a sewing machine to sew the fabric shapes together along lines on the paper) as well, nor should the two distinct paper piecing techniques be confused with each other.
