= Cecelia Pedescleaux =

African-American artist (born 1945)

Cecelia Tapplette Pedescleaux, also known as Cely, (born August 6, 1945) is an African-American quilter of traditional and art quilts, inspired by historians, other African-American quilters, and quilt designs used during the Underground Railroad to communicate messages to slaves seeking freedom. Her quilts have been shown in China, France, Washington, D.C., New Orleans, and in other locations in the United States. A solo show of 75 of her quilts were shown at the Le Musée de Free People of Color in New Orleans (2013–2014).

== Career ==
Pedescleaux's interest in textile arts began as a child when she began to crochet and knit. In the late 1960s, she began creating quilts based upon traditional designs. As she read design and other books about American slaves, her designs became Afro-centric. She has created quilts based upon African art, like the bright, beaded quilt with the Ashanti Adinkra symbol Gye Nyame, meaning "accept God", from Ghana that was shown at the Inspiration Exhibition curated by Don Marshall and Sara Hollis at the Contemporary Arts Center. The book, Hidden in Plain View, by Jacqueline Tobin and Raymond G. Dobard, Jr., a Howard University professor, tells of how quilts were used to document secret messages and routes used by slaves to navigate the Underground Railroad. This book served as an inspiration to Pedescleaux, who researched African-American quilters and quilt designs related to the Underground Railroad and reproduced many of the designs.

She has been inspired by the work of Mary McLeod Bethune and the books of David C. Driscoll, Carolyn L. Mazloomi, Faith Ringgold, Cuesta Benberry, Roland Freeman, Gladys-Marie Fry, and Maude Wahlham. Pedescleaux has also been inspired by the multicultural city of New Orleans with people of African, Caribbean, Hispanic, European, and Native American heritage. She says that her quilts are "made up of 75 percent research, 15 percent cloth, and 10 percent heart". She has created traditional and art quilts, using thread painting, beading, trapunto, patchwork, wax batik, photo transfer, cloth collage, three-dimensional cloth flowers and figures, and traditional African American quilting techniques such as strip quilting.

About her work, she said,

It is almost like a memorial to my ancestors. Every time I work on a traditional pattern, my thoughts go back to older days and how hard it was to get fabric, to find the time to stitch, and how many uses the quilt had to accomplish. Then the joy of life meets the hardships, and the traditional pattern takes on a whole new wonderful life.

— Cecelia Pedescleaux

She lectured, demonstrated, and taught quilting throughout the United States and established a quilting group at Beecher Memorial United Church of Christ in New Orleans that made more than 100 quilts for Child Welfare agencies in 2013. A quilt that she made of the revolt on La Amistad is held at the Amistad Research Center.

External images
- Jewels of Faith, New Orleans Museum of Art
- Red Beans and Ricely Yours, Arts Council New Orleans
- See slideshow of seven quilts

Nine of her quilts were shown in "A Patchwork of Cultures: Traveling Exhibit from Louisiana to France," an exhibition sponsored by the French Patchwork Association at the U.S. Embassy in Paris in 2008 to 2009. The DAR Museum in Washington, D.C. exhibited the quilts in 2010 at the "Honoring Lafayette Contemporary Quilts from France and America" exhibition. Her work was included in "The Sum of Many Parts: 25 Quilt makers in 21st Century America" held in Beijing at the U.S. Embassy (2012–2013) and later at the State Historical Museum of Iowa (2013–2014). A one-person show, "Why I Believe: An African-American Perspective of Quilting" of 75 of her quilts were shown at the Le Musée de Free People of Color (2013–2014). Jewels of Faith, representing "the complexity and simplicity of the people of the world, and their faith", was shown at "Imago Mundi—Reparation: Contemporary Artists from New Orleans" exhibition (2014–2015) at the New Orleans Museum of Art.

Drawings made by children at the Reliance Center in Houston, Texas were used in Katrina Kids Quilt, which was displayed at The New York Arts Club in New York City. Her work has been shown at galleries and museums, including Ogden Museum of Southern Art, New Orleans Museum of Art (NOMA), New Orleans African American Museum, Ashe Cultural Arts Center, Jazz & Heritage Foundation Gallery, Contemporary Arts Center, and Stella Jones Gallery. Her work has also been shown at Southern University, Tulane University, Southeastern University, and Xavier University.

== See also ==
- Quilt Treasures
- Quilts of the Underground Railroad
- Women of Color Quilters Network
