= Great Lakes Quilt Center =

Center for quilt-related research and education

Coordinates: 42°43′53.62″N 84°28′53.78″W

The Great Lakes Quilt Center is an academic center for quilt-related research, education, and exhibition activities. While many of these quilts are in the MSU Museum's collection, collections are stored off-site from the museum building and the collections facility does not have a visitors center. While the museum, established in 1857, has long held significant collections, its focus of activities on quilt scholarship and education began with the launch of the Michigan Quilt Project at the museum in 1984. The Michigan Quilt Project not only spearheaded the documentation of the state's quiltmaking history, but also stimulated interest in strengthening the museum's quilt collection, upgrading its care, and expanding its use. As of 2008, the Michigan Quilt Project has collected documentation on over 9000 quilts in the state and the collection of quilts numbers over 700 with significant examples from Michigan and the Great Lakes region, examples of quilts from numerous African countries, major ethnographic collections of Native American quilts and Michigan African American quilts, and special collections assembled by Kitty Clark Cole, Merry and Albert Silber, Deborah Harding, and Betty Quarton Hoard. The MSU Museum also houses two important collections developed by pioneering American quilt historians Cuesta Benberry and Mary Schafer.

In partnership with MATRIX: Center for Humane Arts, Letters, and Social Sciences OnLine and the Alliance for American Quilts, the MSU Museum/Great Lakes Quilt Center has spearheaded the development of two major national projects. The multimedia Quilt Treasures Project develops “web portraits” built from video-taped oral history and supporting archival materials. These web portraits document the lives, work, and influence of leaders of the American quilt revival of the last quarter of the 20th century. The Quilt Index is a national digital repository of quilt and quilt-related collections in distributed physical repositories. The Quilt Index digitally preserves the collections and makes them accessible and searchable for research and teaching. The project was beta-tested with the collections of the MSU Museum and, as of 2008, the repository holds over 18000 quilts from nine collections. By the end of 2010, another twelve collections will be added and plans are underway for the addition of scores more.

== Stated goals ==
According to the GLQC website, the primary goals of the center are to:

- Record written and oral history documenting quilting and the personal histories of quiltmakers
- Expand and maintain a research collection of information on Great Lakes quilting
- Initiate educational and exhibition programs to bring quilting history to a wider audience
- Increase awareness of textile conservation issues and support preservation efforts of endangered textiles
- Identify and recognize quilters and quilting traditions from diverse regional, social, economic, and ethnic backgrounds
- Honor outstanding individual quilters and quilt groups through the Michigan Heritage Awards and other programs
- Support the continuation of traditional quilting styles and practices through the Michigan Traditional Arts Apprenticeship Program
- Publish information on Great Lakes quilts, quilters, and quilting

== Collections ==
The Great Lakes Quilt Center is home to several distinct quilt and textile collections. These include:

- Michigan African American Quilt Collection
- The Clarke Family Quilt Collection
- Kitty Clark Cole Quilt Collection
- Durkee-Blakeslee-Quarton-Hoard Family Quilt Collection
- The Deborah Harding Redwork Collection
- International Textile Collection
- Michigan Quilts
- North American Indian and Native Hawaiian Quilt Collection
- Merry and Albert Silber Quilt Collection
- Cuesta Benberry African and African-American Quilt and Quilt Ephemera Collection

== Exhibitions ==
- Quilts from MSU Museum Collections, Battle Creek, MI, 1987
- New Donations to the MSU Museum’s Quilts Collections, MSUM, 1987
- Stories in Thread: Hmong Pictorial Embroidery, MSUM, 1987
- Quilts in the Classroom, MSUM, 1987
- Michigan Quilts: 150 Years of a Textile Tradition, MSUM, 1987
- Michigan Quilts: 150 Years of a Textile Tradition, Kresge Art Museum, 1987
- Michigan Quilts: 150 Years of a Textile Tradition, Michigan Historical Museum, 1987
- Quilts from the Merry and Albert Silber Collection, MSUM, 1988
- Michigan Quilts, Chicago Hilton, 1989
- Quilts of Rosie Wilkins: Improvisational Quiltmaking in the African-American Tradition, Michigan Women’s Historical Center, 1989
- The Names Quilt Project Quilt: Traditions in Needlework in Social Change and Public Memorials, MSUM, 1990
- African-American Quiltmaking Traditions in Michigan, MSUM, 1991
- Quilts from the Michigan State University Museum Collection, Muskegon Museum of Art, 1992
- A Family Legacy: Quilts from the Clarke Collection, MSUM, 1993
- Native Quilts and Quilters: A National Gathering, MSUM, 1996
- To Honor and Comfort: Native Quilting Traditions, 1998
- Native Quilts from the Michigan State University Museum Collection, Petoskey, MI, 1998
- Native American Quilts from the Southwest: Tradition, Creativity and Inspiration, Institute for American Indian Art, Santa Fe, NM, 1998
- Great Lakes Native Quilting, MSUM, 1999
- American Quilt Study Group’s Seminar exhibits, MSUM, 1999
- Oklahoma Quilt (memorial to the bombing), MSU Ad Building, 2000
- Michigan Quilt Project: New Discoveries, MSUM, 2001
- The Mary Schafer: A Legacy of Quilt History, MSUM, 2001
- Quilts from the MSU Museum, Novi, MI, 2001
- Great Lakes, Great Quilts, contest winners various venues, 2002
- American Quilts from the Michigan State University Museum, Japan, 2003
- Quilts Old and New: Reproductions from the Great Lakes Quilt Center, MSUM, 2003
- Weavings of War: Fabrics of Memory, MSUM, 2006
- Redwork: A Textile Tradition in America, MSUM, 2006
- Quilts and Human Rights, MSUM, 2008

== Current traveling exhibits ==
The following exhibitions were organized by the Great Lakes Quilt Center:

- To Honor and Comfort: Native Quilting Traditions
- Great Lakes Native Quilting
- Michigan Quilt Project Blocks
- The Mary Schafer Collection: A Legacy of Quilt History
- Quilts Old and New: Reproductions from the Great Lakes Quilt Center
- Quilting Sisters: African-American Quiltmaking in Michigan

== On-line exhibits ==
- To Honor and Comfort: Native Quilting Traditions (virtual version/Michigan State University Museum)
- The Mary Schafer Collection: A Legacy of Quilt History (virtual)
- Mary Schafer: Quilter, Quilt Collector, and Quilt Historian (virtual)
- Quilt Treasures: Presenting Mary Schafer (virtual)
- Redwork: A Textile Tradition in America (virtual)
- Quilts and Human Rights (virtual)
- Weavings of War (virtual)

== Projects ==
Projects directed by the Great Lakes Quilt Center include:

- Michigan Quilt Project, a project that seeks to document significant quilts made or owned in Michigan
- Quilt Index
- H-Quilts, a scholarly discussion list devoted to quilt history and other significant topics in quilting
- Great Lakes Folk Festival, a three-day festival held in August of each year in East Lansing, Michigan that features traditional music, arts, and foods significant to the Great Lakes region

GLQC Projects associated with the Alliance for American Quilts include:

- Michigan "Quilters Save Our Stories"
- Michigan Boxes Under the Bed
- Quilt Treasures

== Publications ==
- MacDowell, Marsha. (Ed.) African American Quiltmaking in Michigan. East Lansing, MI: Michigan State University Press, 1997.
- MacDowell, Marsha (Ed.). American Quilts from Michigan State University Museum. Tokyo: Kokusai Art, 2003.
- MacDowell, Marsha. (Ed.) Great Lakes, Great Quilts. Lafayette, Calif. : C&T Pub., 2001.
- MacDowell, Marsha and Ruth D. Fitzgerald (Eds). Michigan Quilts: 150 Years of a Textile Tradition. East Lansing, Mich.: Michigan State University Museum, 1987.
- MacDowell, Marsha. Stories in Thread: Hmong Pictorial Embroidery. East Lansing, Mich.: Michigan Traditional Arts Program, Folk Arts Division, Michigan State University Museum, 1989.
- MacDowell, Marsha and C. Kurt Dewhurst (Eds.). To Honor and Comfort: Native Quilting Traditions. Santa Fe, New Mexico: Museum of New Mexico Press, 1997.
- Marston, Gwen and Joe Cunningham. Mary Schafer and Her Quilts. East Lansing, MI: Michigan State University Museum, 1990.
- Marston, Gwen Q is for Quilt: An ABC Quilt Pattern Book. East Lansing, Mich.: Michigan State University Museum, 1987.

== See also ==
- List of museums in Michigan
- Textile conservator
- Textile museum
