= Francine Haskins =

American artist

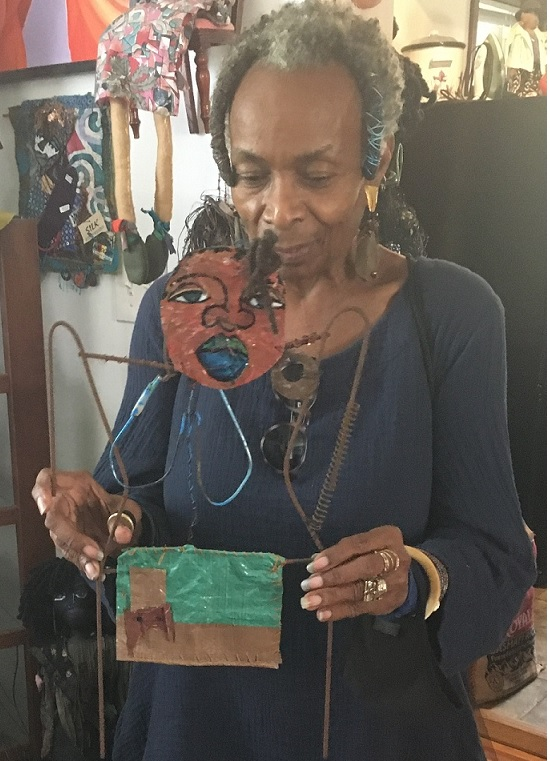
- Francine Haskins, Washington, D.C. multi-media artist, 2021.
- Born: February 10, 1947 (age 79); Washington, D.C., U.S.
- Education: McKinley Technology High School, Corcoran School of the Arts and Design
- Known for: Painting; Textile arts, Quilting, dollmaking Children's Books

Francine Haskins (born February 10, 1947), a Washington, D.C. native, is an American multi-media fiber artist and book illustrator. She was one of the original founders of 1800 Belmont Arts, an African-American black art collective in Washington, D.C. (1991–2001).

== Early life and education ==
Haskins was born in 1947, one of two children born to Thomas Haskins, a North Carolina railroad worker who later worked as a waiter in the United States Senate Dining Hall, and Frances Datcher Haskins, who taught English at Terrell Junior High. She grew up in segregated Washington, D.C. and attended McKinley Technical High School. She was a member of the Arts Club there. Haskins were influenced by her junior and senior year art teacher, Sam Gilliam. In 1965, she majored in advertising design at the Corcoran School of Art because she thought "it was the only way you could make a living as an artist." Corcoran professor and printmaker Percy Martin introduced Haskins to architect and community activist Topper Carew of the New Thing Art and Architecture Center. In 1970, she worked in the art department of The New Thing creating posters, brochures and teaching art to neighborhood children.

== Artwork ==
Haskins later worked 13 years for the department store Garfinckel's on the sales floor and in the buying office. Haskins started creating her own note cards and dolls featuring everyday African American life because she noticed a lack of such product in retail stores. By 1985, Haskins left Garfinckel's to become a fulltime working artist showing her works at art fairs, Black memorabilia shows and through commissions.

In the early 1990s, Harriet Rohmer, head of Children's Book Press, saw Haskins' illustrations on a sweatshirt at a bookfair and sought Haskins out to create a book with African American characters. Haskins reflected on her childhood in Washington, D.C., and wrote and illustrated I Remember 121 (1990) and Things I Like About Grandma (1991). The initial print run for I Remember 121 was 10,000 books and was used in "several urban school districts."

In 1993, Haskins directed first graders in painting a mural on an outside wall at Shepherd Park Elementary School in Washington, D.C.

The National Museum of African American History and Culture gift shop has included handmade dolls by Haskins since 2016.

== 1800 Belmont Arts ==
Washington, D.C. resident Rashida Mims conceived a community space dedicated to Black art and culture. In 1991, she, her husband Jamal Mims and a few other artists opened 1800 Belmont Arts, a Victorian home at 1800 Belmont Road, NW in the Adams Morgan neighborhood. Rooms in the home were divided into retail spaces. Haskins opened her studio there in 1991 and sold her artwork to the public. For several years, Haskins also taught hand-made dollmaking on Saturdays at her 1800 Belmont Arts studio.

The longest tenured artists at 1800 Belmont Arts included Haskins, Ampofo Designs, featuring ceramic sculpture of Ghanaian Kwabena Ampofo and textile designs by his wife, Heather, and the Graham Collection, featuring Black collectibles and memorabilia. The three-story home closed in 2001. A few of the retailers, including Haskins, then opened Belmont Arts East in the Brookland neighborhood in Washington, D.C. from 2001 to 2007.

== Selected publications ==
Books by or with contributions from Francine Haskins
Title	Published	Publisher	OCLC	Notes
I Remember "121"	1991	Children's Book Press, San Francisco, CA	OCLC 990575596	Haskins describes her family life and daily activities from the ages of three to nine and celebrates the experience of growing up in a traditional African-American community in Washington, D.C.
Things I Like about Grandma	1992	Children's Book Press, Emeryville, CA	OCLC 607783606	Haskins wrote and illustrated. An African-American girl and her grandmother share a close relationship.
Francine Haskins Studio Presents "Same Spirit, Different Hands": The Belmont Arts Guild Cookbook	1994		OCLC 1112466069	Comb-binding cookbook includes recipes African American visual artists Aundra V. McCoy, Julee Dickerson Thompson, Liani Foster and Haskins.
Hair!	1987	Mandala Publication, Greenwood, MS		30-page paperback book about African-American hair care by Mildred Nero Drinkard, illustrated by Francine Haskins. Two reflective "mirrors" included. ISBN 1-878519-04-2.
A Christmas Carol	2018	Black Threads Press		Haskins illustrates Charles Dickens' unabridged classic with favorite characters as Black Victorians. ISBN 978-0982479629
Tenderheaded: A Comb-Bending Collection of Hair Stories	2002	Washington Square Press, New York, NY	OCLC 49826721	Anthology of essays, poems, illustrations and more about African-American women and their hair. Edited by Juliette Harris and Pamela Johnson. Illustrations by Haskins are on pages 66, 69, and 152.

== Exhibitions ==
Year	Title	Location	Notes
1991	"Yes Sir. That's My Baby. African American Dolls."	Banneker-Douglass Museum, Annapolis, MD	Curated by Gladys-Marie Fry. Artists included Kimberly Camp, Julee Dickerson, Annie Dickerson, Joyce J. Scott, Elizabeth Talford Scott and Francine Haskins.
1992	"Dolls! by African-American Artists"	Diggs Gallery, Winston-Salem State University	Curated by Gladys-Marie Fry. Artists included Kimberly Camp, Julee Dickerson, Annie Dickerson, Joyce J. Scott, Elizabeth Talford Scott and Francine Haskins. April 21–June 13, 1992. Exhibit catalog.
1992	"Testimony of Culture: African American Arts Speaks to the Jury"	Ascension Gallery, Washington, D.C.	Group exhibit featuring works by Al Smith, Kevin Holder, Winton Kennedy, Inonge Khabele, Lois Mailou Jones, Larry "Poncho" Brown and Francine Haskins. June 7 – October 28, 1992.
1995	"Pass It On: The Art of African-American Children's Literature"	Banneker-Douglass Museum, Annapolis, MD	Tom Feelings, Jerry Pinkney, John Steptoe and Francine Haskins featured children's book illustrators. January 1-June 30, 1995.
2003	"Something for the Soul"	American Jazz Museum, Kansas City, MO	Exhibit of handmade dolls and quilts by 13 Black artists including Gwendolyn Aqui, NedRa Bonds, Patricia Coleman-Cobb, Viola Burley Leak, Chris Malone, Sherry Whetstone-McCall, Francine Haskins and others.
2006	"FOUND! Black Artists of DC2	Graham Collection, Washington, D.C.	The 2nd Annual Exhibition of Black Artists of DC (BADC) included 64 Washington DC area artists including Gwendolyn Aqui, Liani Foster, Gloria C. Kirk, Viola Burley Leak, Amber Robles-Gordon, Renée Stout, Frank E. Smith, Francine Haskins and others. Barbara Blanco, Curator. July 1–29, 2006.
2012	"Whimsical/Funky Hand Painted Chairs"	Adobe Design Center & Showroom, Washington, D.C.	Group exhibition featuring chairs by Daniel T. Brooking, Gwendolyn Aqui Brooks, Anne Bouie, T.H. Gomillion, Toni Hodges, Gloria C. Kirk, Magruder Murray, Ann Marie Williams and Francine Haskins. March 17–31, 2012.
2013	"Belmont Legacy Exhibition"	Mount Rainier Artist Lofts, Mount Rainier, MD	Historical photographs and present-day artwork from former 1800 Belmont Arts artists including Ampofo Design, The Graham Collection and Francine Haskins Studio. Exhibit catalog.
2019	"Assemblages: Fiber, Thread and Found Objects"	Portico Gallery, Brentwood, MD	Exhibition featuring mixed media arts by Washington, D.C. artists James Brown, IBe' Crawley, Jeri Hubbard and Francine Haskins as well as Harlem, NY artists Laura Gadson and Shimoda. Curated by John Paradiso and Imani W. Russell. June 2019.
2020	"African American Dollmaking and Puppetry: Renegotiating Identity, Restoring Community"	Library of Congress, American Folklife Center, D.C.	Handmade dolls and puppets by artists Kibibi Ajanku, Camila Bryce-Laporte, Schroeder Cherry, Deborah R. Grayson, Linda Kato, Imani W. Russell, Cynthia Sands, Paula Whaley and Francine Haskins.
2021	Nine Months | Nine Perspectives: Birth of 2020 Visions"	Pyramid Atlantic Art Center, Hyattsville, MD	Artists’ books in response to effect of COVID-19, Black Lives Matter movement and more. Artists include Adjoa J. Burrowes, Julee Dickerson-Thompson, Aziza Claudia Gibson-Hunter, Michele Godwin, Pamela Harris Lawton, Gloria Patton, Gail Shaw-Clemons, Kamala Subramanian and Francine Haskins. July 24–August 29, 2021.
