= Quilts of the Underground Railroad =

Disputed theory that the Underground Railroad used quilts to inform slaves

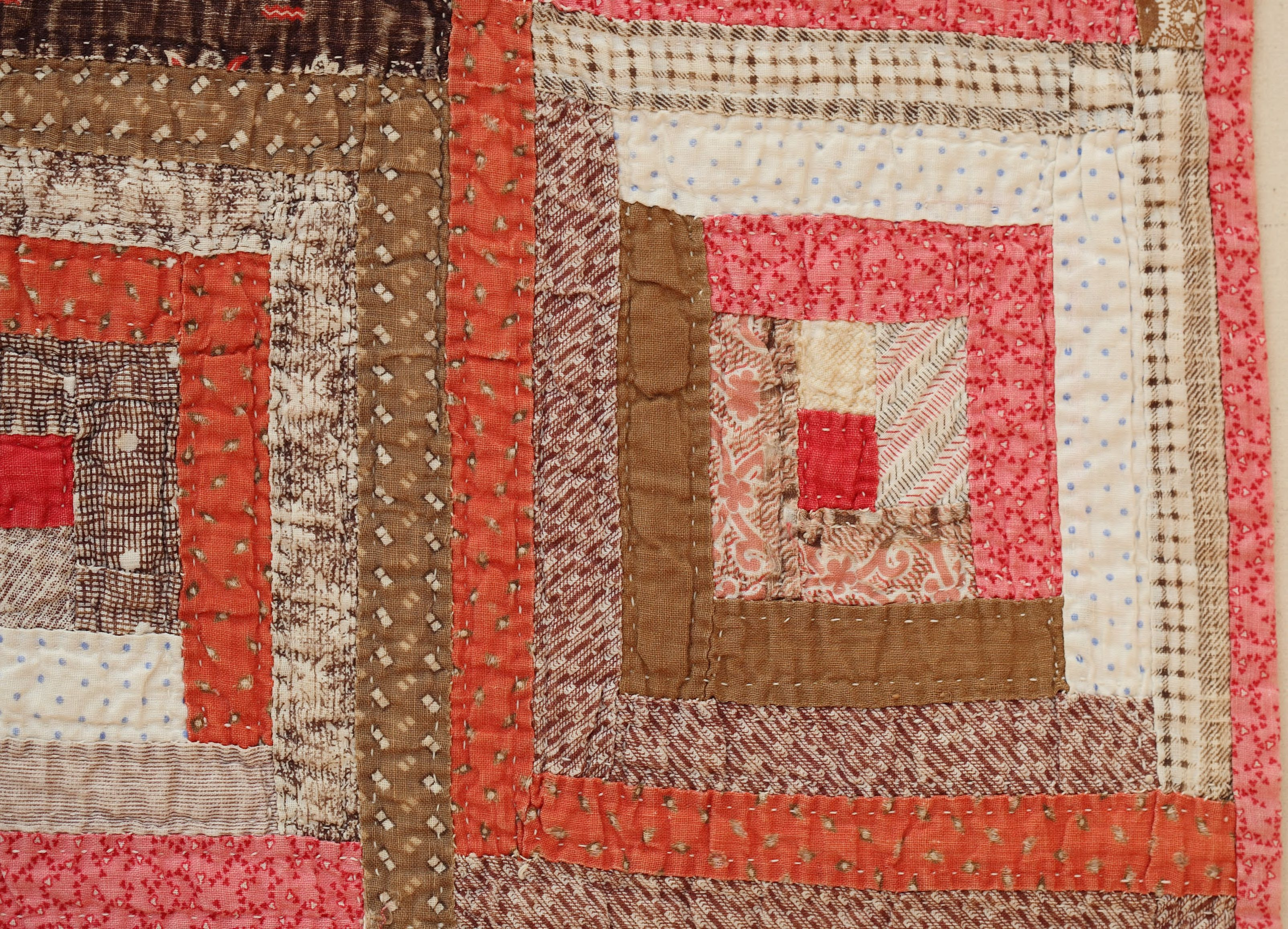
The log cabin quilt pattern, said to represent a safe house on the Underground Railroad.

Quilts of the Underground Railroad describes a controversial belief that quilts were used to communicate information to African slaves about how to escape to freedom via the Underground Railroad. It has been disputed by a number of historians.

== Books that emphasize quilt use ==
In Stitched from the Soul (1990), Gladys-Marie Fry asserted that quilts were used to communicate safe houses and other information about the Underground Railroad, which was a network through the United States and into Canada of "conductors", meeting places, and safe houses for the passage of African Americans out of slavery. The theory that quilts and songs were used to communicate information about the Underground Railroad is disputed among historians. Even so, escaping slavery was generally an act of "complex, sophisticated and covert systems of planning".

The 1999 book Hidden in Plain View, by Raymond Dobard, Jr., an art historian, and Jacqueline Tobin, a college instructor in Colorado, explores how quilts were used to communicate information about the Underground Railroad. The idea for the book came from Ozella McDaniel Williams who told Tobin that her family had passed down a story for generations about how patterns like wagon wheels, log cabins, and wrenches were used in quilts to navigate the Underground Railroad. Williams stated that the quilts had ten squares, each with a message about how to successfully escape. It started with a monkey wrench, that meant to gather up necessary supplies and tools, and ended with a star, which meant to head north. The book claims that there was a quilt code that conveyed messages in counted knots and quilt block shapes, colors and names. In a 2007 Time magazine article, Tobin stated: "It's frustrating to be attacked and not allowed to celebrate this amazing oral story of one family's experience. Whether or not it's completely valid, I have no idea, but it makes sense with the amount of research we did." Dobard said, "I would say there has been a great deal of misunderstanding about the code. In the book Jackie and I set out to say it was a set of directives. It was a beginning, not an end-all, to stir people to think and share those stories." He called the book "informed conjecture, as opposed to a well-documented book with a "wealth of evidence".

Even though the book tells the story from the perspective of one family, folk art expert Maud Wahlman believes that it is possible that the hypothesis is true. "There’s a tradition in Africa where coding things is controlled by secret societies. If you want to learn the deeper meaning of symbols, then you need to show worthiness of knowing these deeper meanings by not telling anyone," she said. Wahlman wrote the foreword for Hidden in Plain View.

== Response ==
Giles Wright, an Underground Railroad expert, asserts that the book is based upon folklore that is unsubstantiated by other sources. He also said that there are no memoirs, diaries, or Works Progress Administration interviews conducted in the 1930s of ex-slaves that mention quilting codes. Quilt historians Kris Driessen, Barbara Brackman, and Kimberly Wulfert do not believe the theory that quilts were used to communicate messages about the Underground Railroad.

Controversy in the hypothesis became more intense in 2007 when plans for a sculpture of Frederick Douglass at a corner of Central Park called for a huge quilt in granite to be placed in the ground to symbolize the manner in which slaves were aided along the Underground Railroad. Noted historians did not believe that the hypothesis was true and saw no connection between Douglass and this belief. Civil War historian David W. Blight said, "At some point the real stories of fugitive slave escape, as well as the much larger story of those slaves who never could escape, must take over as a teaching priority. It ought to be rooted in real and important aspects of his life and thought, not a piece of folklore largely invented in the 1990s which only reinforces a soft, happier version of the history of slavery that distracts us from facing harsher truths and a more compelling past." Fergus Bordewich, the author of Bound for Canaan: The Underground Railroad and the War for the Soul of America, calls it "fake history", based upon the mistaken premise that the Underground Railroad activities "were so secret that the truth is essentially unknowable". He says that most of the people who successfully escaped slavery were "enterprising and well informed."

Even so, there are museums, schools, and others who believe the story to be true. John Reddick, who worked on the Douglass sculpture project for Central Park, states that it is paradoxical that historians require written evidence of slaves who were not allowed to read and write. He likens the coding of the quilts to the language in "Swing Low, Sweet Chariot", in which slaves meant escaping but their masters thought was about dying.

== See also ==
- African-American art
- African textiles
- Cecelia Pedescleaux, Underground Railroad quilt researcher and quilter
- Cornrows
- History of quilting
- Quilts of Gee's Bend
- Songs of the Underground Railroad
- Who's Afraid of Aunt Jemima?

== Sources ==
- Brackman, Barbara (1997) Quilts from the Civil War: Nine Projects, Historic Notes, Diary Entries, ISBN 1-57120-033-9
- Burns, Eleanor; Sue Bouchard (2003). The Underground Railroad Sampler. Quilt in a Day. ISBN 978-1-891776-13-7.
- Cord, Xenia (March 2006). "The Underground Railroad". Popular Patchwork. 14 (3). Archived from the original on October 20, 2021.
- Fellner, Leigh (2010) "Betsy Ross redux: The quilt code."
- Frazier, Harriet C. (1 July 2004). Runaway and Freed Missouri Slaves and Those Who Helped Them, 1763–1865. McFarland. p. 168. ISBN 978-0-7864-1829-9.
- Rice, Kym S. (2011). World of a Slave: A-I. ABC-CLIO. p. 390. ISBN 978-0-313-34944-7.
- Turner, Patricia A. (2009). Crafted Lives: Stories and Studies of African American Quilters.
- Zegart, Shelley (2008) Myth and methodology: Shelley Zegart unpicks African American Quilt Scholarship Selvedge, (ISSN 1742-254X) Issue 21 (Jan/February 2008) pp. 48–56.
