= Clarissa Sligh =

American artist

- Born: 1939; Washington, D.C. U.S.
- Education: Hampton University; Howard University; Wharton School of the University of Pennsylvania
- Occupations: Artist, photographer, book artist, essayist, lecturer
- Website: ClarissaSligh.com

Clarissa T. Sligh (born 1939) is an African-American book artist and photographer based in Asheville, North Carolina. At age 15, she was the lead plaintiff in a school desegregation case in Virginia. In 1988, she became a co-founder of Coast-to-Coast: A Women of Color National Artists' Project, which focused on promoting works completed by women of color.

== Early life and education ==
Sligh was born in Washington, D.C. She grew up in a large working-class family and "went to segregated schools in a predominantly white Virginia county." In 1955, at the age of 15, she was the lead plaintiff in a school desegregation case in Virginia (Thompson v County School Board of Arlington County).

Sligh attended the traditionally African-American Hampton Institute in Hampton, Virginia, where she earned a bachelor's degree in mathematics in 1961. In 1972, she received a bachelor's degree in Visual Arts from Howard University in Washington DC, and in 1973, an MBA from the Wharton School at the University of Pennsylvania. In 1999, she received a Master of Fine Arts degree in Visual Arts from Howard University.

== Career ==
Before working as an artist, Sligh had a job at NASA where she worked in the crewed space flight program. In 1987, Sligh was able to leave her day job to focus on working as an artist.

Her work has been exhibited at the Jewish Museum in New York City, and at the National African American Museum Project, at the Smithsonian Institution in Washington, DC, the forerunner to the National Museum of African American History and Culture.

Her work is in the collections of The Museum of Modern Art, the National Gallery of Art, the National Museum of Women in the Arts (NMWA), the Walker Art Center in Minneapolis, Minnesota,

== Field of work ==
Sligh considers herself foremost a storyteller. Her photographs and artist books center on politics, family life, questions of identity, and personal experience. Her work also engages more broadly in creative explorations of history, social justice, and transformation. In her work, Sligh combines photographs and other images with text; as she added more text, she moved from creating prints to book works.

According to Carla Williams, Sligh's work reflects on our perceptions of normality and our roles in different frameworks such as family, society, gender and ethnic groups. As Williams says, "In school readers from her childhood, Sligh discovered the model from which to confront the realities of her own life." Sligh has created books reflecting directly on her experience as the lead plaintiff in a 1955 Virginia school desegregation case (Thompson v County School Board of Arlington County): an essay, The Plaintiff Speaks (2004), and an artist book, It Wasn’t Little Rock (2004 and 2005).

Sligh has also created artist books that engage with her own experiences as a Black child reading books, including Reading Dick & Jane with Me (1989), a narrative about learning to read as a Black child, and My Mother, Walt Whitman and Me (2019), focusing on a copy of Leaves of Grass that her mother found in the trash and brought home.

== Coast-to-Coast National Women Artists of Color Projects ==
In 1988, Sligh co-founded the Coast-to-Coast National Women Artists of Color Project with Faith Ringgold and Margaret Gallegos. From 1988 to 1996, this organization exhibited the works of African American women across the United States.

According to this source, Sligh also worked with other organizations that display art made by African American females. The organizations included the National Women's Caucus for Art (1985-1994), The Artist Federal Credit Union, New York (1986-1987), Printed Matter (1992-1996), and the artists advisory board of the Womens Studio Workshop (2004-2007).

In 1990, Sligh was one of three organizers of the exhibit "Coast to Coast: A Women of Color National Artists' Book Project" held January 14 – February 2, 1990, at the Flossie Martin Gallery, and later at the Eubie Blake Center and the Artemesia Gallery. Faith Ringgold wrote the catalog introduction titled "History of Coast to Coast." More than 100 Women of Color artists were included. The catalog included brief artist statements and photos of the artists' books, including works by: Emma Amos (painter), Beverly Buchanan, Elizabeth Catlett, Dolores Cruz, Dorothy Holden, Martha Jackson Jarvis, Young-Im Kim, Viola Burley Leak, Howardena Pindell, Faith Ringgold, Adrian Piper, Joyce J. Scott, Freida High Tesfagiorgis, Denise Ward-Brown, Bisa Washington, and Deborah Willis.

== Awards ==
- 1988: Women's Studio Workshop, Artist in Residence, Book Arts
- 1998: National Endowment for the Arts, Visual Arts grant
- 2004: Women's Studio Workshop, Artist in Residence, Book Arts
- 2006: Leeway Foundation's Art and Change Grant

== Works and publications ==
- What's Happening With Momma?, Women's Studio Workshop Press, 1988
- Reading Dick and Jane with Me, Visual Studies Workshop Press, 1989
- Voyage(r): A Tourist Map to Japan, Nexus Press, 2000
- Wrongly Bodied Two, Women's Studio Workshop Press, 2004
- It Wasn't Little Rock, Visual Studies Workshop Press, 2005
- Wrongly Bodied: Documenting Transition from Female to Male, self-published with the Leeway Foundation, 2009
- Transforming Hate: An Artist's Book, 2016
