= DAR Museum =

Museum in Washington, D.C.

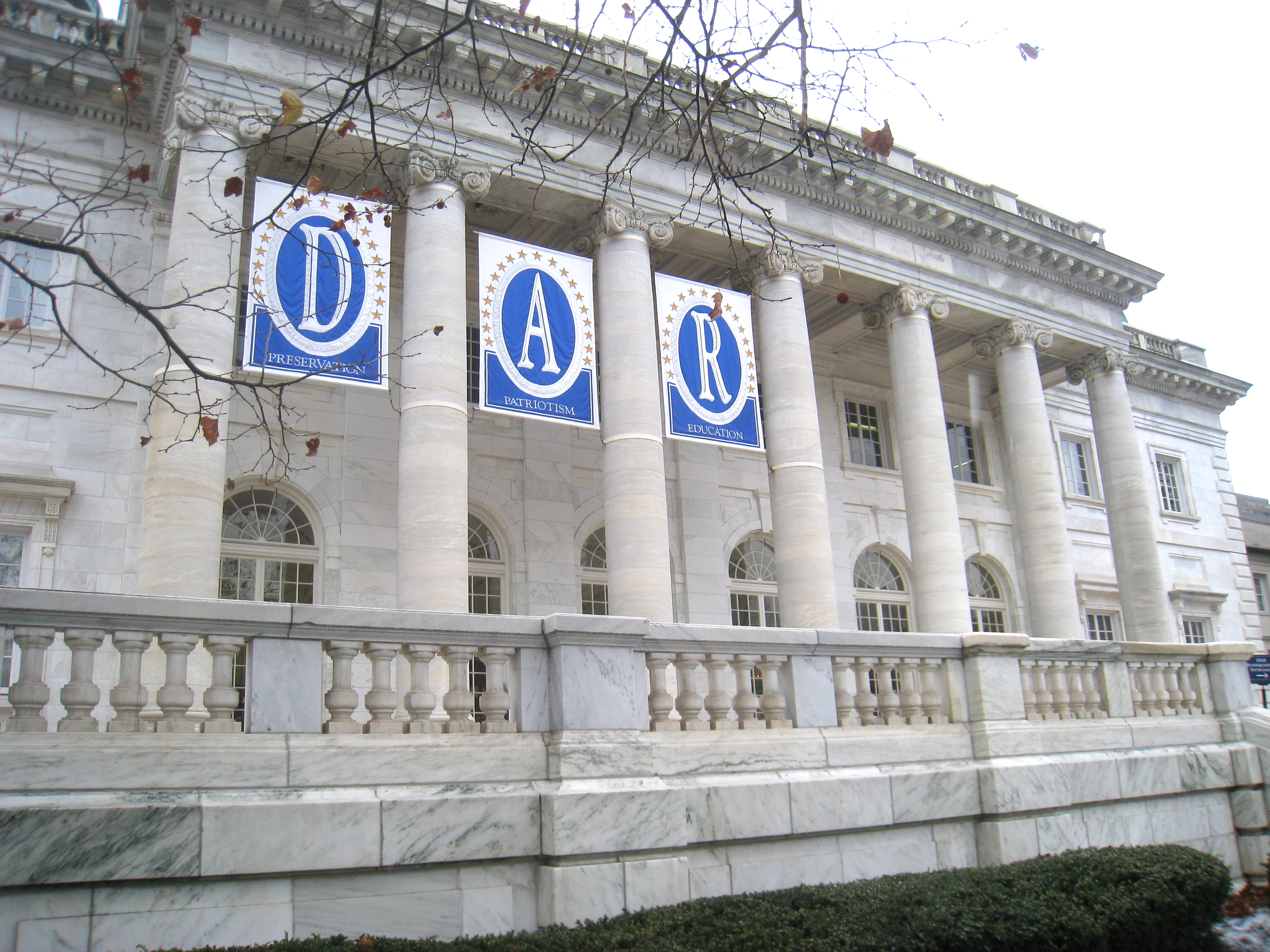

- Location within Washington, D.C.
- Established: 1910
- Location: Washington, D.C.
- Coordinates: 38.893608°N 77.039716°W
- Website: www.dar.org/museum/

The DAR Museum, run by the Daughters of the American Revolution, is an art and history museum in Washington, D.C. The museum is located in Memorial Continental Hall, just down the street from DAR Constitution Hall, where some of the museum's concerts take place.

The museum is known for its more than 30,000 examples of objects made or used in America prior to the Industrial Revolution. Items on display in the more than 30 period rooms include: furniture, silver, paintings, ceramics, and textiles.

The museum's collection also includes the New Hampshire Toy Attic where children are able to play with reproductions of historic toys; it is geared toward children aged four through ten, but offers a range of family-friendly content including its more than 30 period rooms.

== History ==
The DAR Museum was founded in 1890 (the same founding year as the National Society Of Daughters of the American Revolution) as a way of depositing and displaying family heirlooms. As a part of the NSDAR, the museum sought to promote historic preservation and patriotism through collections and displays of colonial era artifacts. Thanks to several DAR organizational, member, non-member, and purchased acquisitions, the museum's collection expanded to more than 30,000 items over the years.

== Programs ==
=== Museum tours ===
The museum is open to the public six days a week for unguided and guided docent tours of period rooms and other museum features, including the DAR library and Americana collection.

=== Library ===
Located in the adjacent DAR Constitution Hall, the library is a facility for researching historical and family information. It is openly accessible to DAR members, and non-DAR members may enter the library for a fee. The library contains roughly 150,000 volumes of genealogical history.

=== Children's programs ===
The DAR Museum provides free programs in relevant subjects to visiting school groups. Tours focus on topics such as historical quilt making, the lives of children in colonial times, and basic facets of 19th century life. The museum also offers weekend family activities.

== Exhibitions ==
=== American period rooms ===
The museum contains over 30 period rooms decorated and furnished in a colonial revival style, with a wide variety of sizes, furnishings and room types. Rooms range from men's studies to contemporary bedrooms to a large attic filled with children's toys. Each room is sponsored by a different NSDAR organization, and vary in age. Photographic tours of period rooms may be taken at the DAR Museum website

=== Fashioning The New Woman: 1890–1925 ===
The museum is currently hosting an exhibition entitled "Fashioning The New Woman: 1890–1925." The exhibition demonstrates trends and changes in women's fashions between the late 19th century and the flapper era. The exhibition discusses trends in women's fashion at the end of the 19th century. At the time, Victorian styles of dress were more common, with bustles, skirts, and other layered items of clothing composing the majority of women's wardrobes. As women began pursuing lifestyles with more activity, activism and sport, these clothing trends began to change towards more modern attire. The exhibit examines the societal changes that accompanied these new fashions, and discusses the lives of key figures in the transformation.

=== Quilt collection ===
The DAR Museum is a contributing member of the Quilt Index searchable quilt database. The museum collects and maintains quilts from the late 1800s and early 1900s in a collection of over 500 quilts and coverlets from the era. Utilizing an active DAR member base and extensive genealogical and family histories of owners, quilt makers and their families, many quilts are accompanied by significant personal histories and stories of their creation and ownership. The museum and NSDAR also run a Quilt Camp summer program for children aged 10–17.
