= Carolyn L. Mazloomi =

African-American art historian and quilter (born 1948)

- Born: Carolyn Louise Stewart; August 22, 1948 (age 78); Baton Rouge, Louisiana, U.S.
- Education: Northrop University; University of Southern California (PhD)
- Occupations: Author, art historian, curator, quilter, aerospace engineer
- Known for: Quilting

Carolyn L. Mazloomi (née Carolyn Louise Stewart; born August 22, 1948) is an American curator, quilter, author, art historian, and aerospace engineer. She is a strong advocate for presenting and documenting African-American-made quilts. Her quilts are designed to tell complex stories around African-American heritage and contemporary experiences.

== Life ==
Carolyn Louise Stewart was born in 1948 in Baton Rouge, Louisiana, to a family of amateur artists and painters. She graduated from Northrop University in Inglewood, California, and worked in Los Angeles as an aerospace engineer.

In the early 1970s, she encountered an Appalachian quilt at a market in Dallas that began her passion for quilting. She continued her quilting experiments while earning her PhD in aerospace engineering from the University of Southern California (USC) Viterbi School of Engineering in 1984.

Mazloomi has since retired from her job as an aerospace engineer and Federal Aviation Administration crash site investigator. She is married to Iranian engineer Rezvan Mazloomi, and together the family lives in Ohio.

== Women of Color Quilters Network ==
In the mid-1980s after trying unsuccessfully to expand her small Los Angeles-based African-American quilting circle, Mazloomi placed an advertisement in Quilter's Newsletter Magazine requesting correspondence with other quilters who shared this frustration. Her advertisement and the resulting correspondence led to the formation of the Women of Color Quilters Network (WOCQN) in 1986, a national organization of 1,700 members.

Founding members of the WOCQN included Mazloomi, Claire E. Carter, aRma Carter, Cuesta Benberry, Meloydy Boyd, Michael Cummings, Peggie Hartwell, and Marie Wilson.

== Quilting ==
Mazloomi works in narrative quilts that tell stories through visuals. Common themes include music, inspired by an aunt who owned a Louisiana juke joint, and the African-American experience during the Civil Rights Movement.

Mazloomi currently serves on the board of directors of the Alliance for American Quilts.

== Works authored on quilting ==
- Spirits of the Cloth: Contemporary African American Quilts (1998). ISBN 978-0609600917
- Threads of Faith: Recent Works from the Women of Color Quilters Network (2004). ISBN 978-1585167739
- Textural Rhythms: Quilting the Jazz Tradition (2007). ISBN 978-0979267505
- Quilting African American Women's History Our Challenges, Creativity and Champions (2008). ISBN 978-0979267512
- The Journey of Hope in America: Quilts Celebrating President Barack Obama (2009). ISBN 978-0760339350

== Awards and honors ==
- In 1999, she was awarded the Black Caucus of the American Library Association Literary Award for Best Nonfiction book, for her work Spirits of the Cloth: Contemporary African American Quilts.
- In 2003, Mazloomi was awarded the first Ohio Heritage Fellowship Award.
- In 2014, Mazloomi was a recipient of a National Heritage Fellowship, specifically the Bess Lomax Hawes Award, bestowed by the National Endowment for the Arts, which is the United States government's highest honor in the folk and traditional arts.
