= Viola Burley Leak =

American artist (b. 1944)

- Born: Viola Burley; 1944 (age 81–82); Nashville, Tennessee, United States
- Education: Fisk University (BA), Pratt Institute (BFA), Hunter College (MA), Howard University (MFA)
- Occupations: Visual artist, educator, designer, printmaker, painter, textile artist, mixed media artist
- Known for: Narrative quilting

Viola Burley Leak (born 1944) is an American visual artist, designer, and educator known for her narrative quilts. She also has worked in painting, printmaking, textiles, and mixed media. Leak is based in Washington, D.C.

== Early life and education ==
Viola Burley was born in Nashville, Tennessee, in 1944. She is African American. Her parents were Hazel and Howard Burley, who operated a drug store in Nashville.

She obtained a bachelor's in art from Fisk University (1965), bachelor of fine arts in fashion design from the Pratt Institute (1968), master's from Hunter College (1973), and a master of fine arts from Howard University (1985).

== Career ==
She works in mixed media, primarily painting, prints, and textiles. Her pieces often deal with religion and African American heritage, blending her personal experiences with mystical elements. Among her influences is the painter Aaron Douglas, with whom she studied in the 1960s.

Leak is a member of the Women of Color Quilters Network (WCQN), founded and led by Carolyn L. Mazloomi.

Her pieces have appeared in more than one hundred exhibitions. She has been in a number of notable exhibitions, including Gathered Visions: Selected Works by African American Women (1990–1991) at Anacostia Community Museum; When the Spirit Moves: African American Dance in History and Art (2000–2001) at Anacostia Community Museum; Threads of Freedom: The Underground Railroad Story in Quilts (2001) at Oberlin College; Racism: In the Face of Hate We Resist (2021) at the Textile Center in Minneapolis; and Black Pioneers: Legacy in the American West (2023) at The California Museum in Sacramento. Solo exhibitions of Leak's work have included a 1990 show at Northern Virginia Community College, Annandale and a 1989 show at Montgomery College.

Leak has taught art from the grade school to the university level. She has also worked as a designer, including a stint as a toy designer at the Ideal Toy Company.

Her work is held in the collections of the Smithsonian American Art Museum, the World Federation of United Nations Associations, and Howard University Art Gallery, among others.
