= Women of Color Quilters Network =

Non-Profit Quilting Network

Women of Color Quilters Network (WCQN) is a national organization dedicated to preserving African American quiltmaking.

Women of Color Quilters Network

== History ==
The Women of Color Quilters Network (WCQN) was founded in 1986 by Carolyn L. Mazloomi.

For many years in the early 1980s, Mazloomi had tried unsuccessfully to expand her circle of African American quilters. She eventually placed an advertisement in Quilter's Newsletter Magazine requesting correspondence with other quilters who shared this frustration. She received several responses to this advertisement, and the resulting correspondence led to the formation of the WCQN.

Founding members of the WCQN included Mazloomi, Claire E. Carter, aRma Carter, Cuesta Benberry, Meloydy Boyd, Michael Cummings, Peggie Hartwell and Marie Wilson.

In 1992–1993, a survey of WCQN members, conducted by quilter Sandra German, indicated members had low expectations for fairness, acceptance, and success from traditional or mainstream quilting ventures (such as quilt guilds, magazines, and contests).

== Overview ==
The objectives of the organization include the fostering and preservation of the art of quilt making among people of color, researching quilt history and documenting quilts, and offering authentic, handmade African American quilts and fiber art to museums and galleries for exhibition.

WCQN membership surpassed 1,000 quilters from the U.S., Canada, the Caribbean, and England.

Many members specialize in narrative quilts on contemporary African-American themes because, as Mazloomi said, "we are a people with many stories to tell."

== Exhibitions ==
WCQN members continue to exhibit their quilts in community venues, local galleries and museums. In 2004, the Museum of Biblical Art in Dallas, Texas, sponsored the traveling exhibition, Threads of Faith: Recent Works from the Women of Color Quilters Network.

Hosted by the Michigan State University Museum, WCQN worked with fiber artists from South Africa to deliver a new exhibition entitled Conscience of the Human Spirit: The Life of Nelson Mandela in 2014. The exhibit featured textile artworks from many South African quilters to show how Mandela affected South African lives and the lives of African Americans.

The WCQN in conjunction with the Cincinnati Museum Center and the National Underground Railroad Freedom Center toured an exhibit curated by Dr. Mazloomi entitled And Still We Rise: Race, Culture, and Visual Conversations across the United States including to The Bullock Museum for the 150th anniversary of Juneteenth in 2015. The exhibition features pictorial quilts depicting the history of African Americans from 1619 to the present. It was then toured to the Spencer Museum of Art at the University of Kansas from July 8, 2017, to September 17, 2017. From October 6 to December 30, 2017, the exhibition toured to the Columbus Museum in Columbus, Georgia. In 2018, from February 6 to May 27, the exhibition was shown at The California Museum in Sacramento.

The Textile Center in Minneapolis, Minnesota in conjunction with the WCQN created a project titled We Are the Story which was shown in the textile center from March 26 to June 12, 2021. After the murder of George Floyd in May 2020, WQCN put out a call for quilts for this project, and by the July 21st deadline, 423 quilts were submitted. This project included exhibitions titled Gone but Never Forgotten: Remembering Those Lost to Police Brutality and Racism: In the Face of Hate We Resist. Gone but Never Forgotten consisted of 26 quilts depicting imagery related to Black victims of police brutality; the exhibition was showcased from September 15 to December 24, 2020, at the Textile Center's Joan Mondale Gallery, and from February 13 to April 1, 2021, at Lanesboro Arts in Lanesboro, Minnesota. Racism: In the Face of Hate We Resist consisted of 63 quilts, often pictorial, depicting images and themes of perseverance and resistance of Black Americans.

== Publications ==
- Women of Color Quilters Network Newsletters published from 1987 – 1993.
- Threads of Faith: Recent Works from the Women of Color Quilters Network (2004)

== Projects ==
The quilter Harriet Powers (1837–1910), formerly enslaved, stitched two quilts known to have survived: Bible Quilt 1886 and Pictorial Quilt 1898. Her quilts are considered among the finest examples of nineteenth-century Southern quilting. Her works are in the permanent collections of the National Museum of American History in Washington, D.C., and the Museum of Fine Arts in Boston, Massachusetts.

In December 2023, a new, commemorative memorial for Harriet and Armstead Powers was dedicated at the Gospel Pilgrim Cemetery. The memorial was sponsored by the Women of Color Quilters Network.

Gospel Pilgrim Cemetery Historical Marker, Athens, Georgia	Harriet and Armstead Powers headstone front side, dedicated December 2, 2023.	Harriet and Armstead Powers headstone back side of memorial.

== Other national quilting organizations ==
Since the founding of the WCQN, other national organizations formed to foster growth among African American quilters have been founded:

- National Association of African American Quilters (1993–1995)
- African American Quilters Group: Let's Grow to 1,000,000

== See also ==
- African-American art
- Quilts of Gee's Bend
- Souls Grown Deep Foundation
