= Memorial Continental Hall =

- U.S. National Register of Historic Places
- U.S. National Historic Landmark
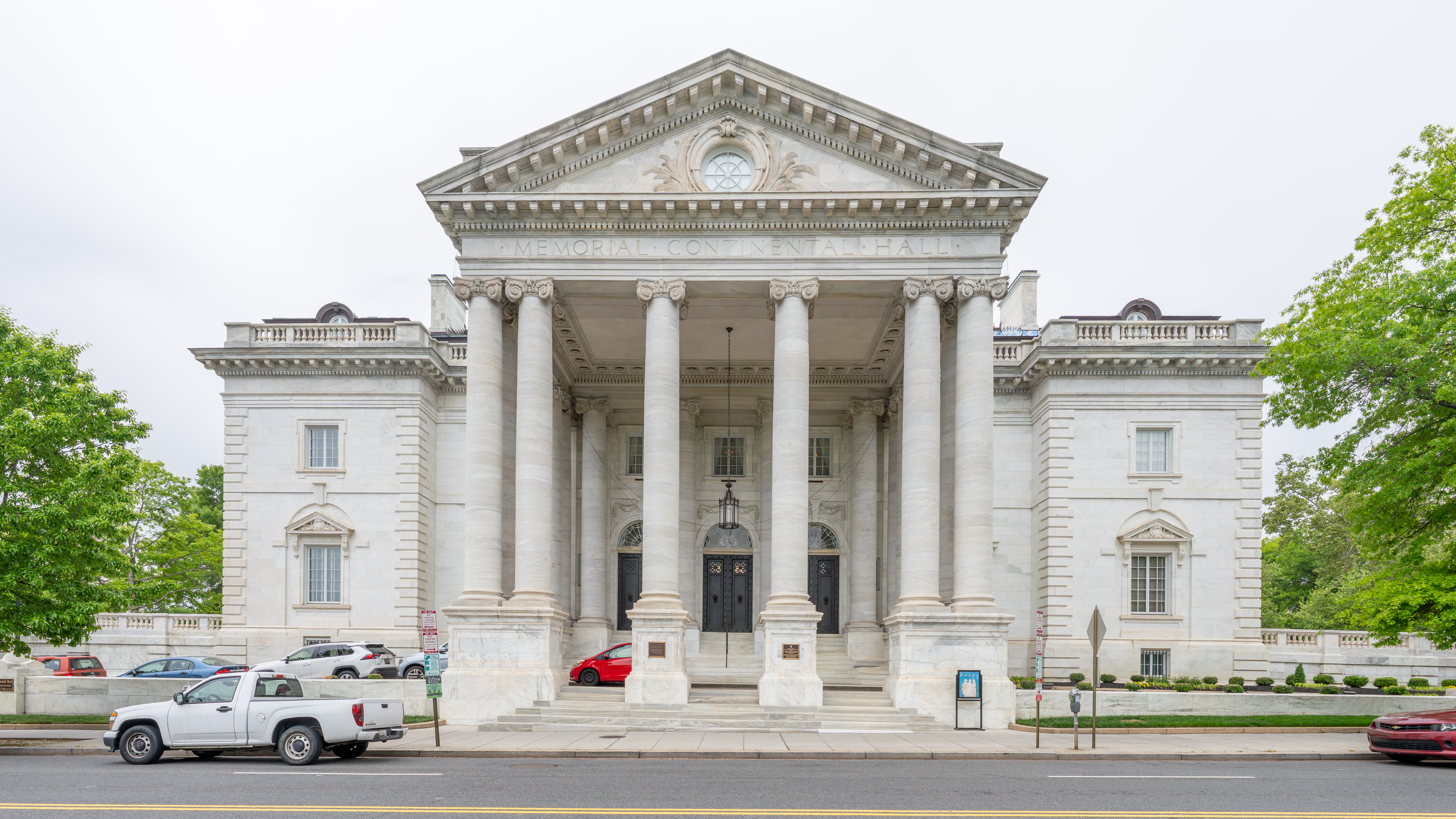

- Location within Central Washington, D.C. Location within the District of Columbia Location within the United States
- Location: 1776 D Street NW, Washington, D.C.
- Coordinates: 38°53′38″N 77°02′24″W
- Built: 1904–1910
- Architect: Edward Pearce Casey
- Architectural style: Georgian revival
- NRHP reference No.: 72001427
- Designated NHL: November 28, 1972

Memorial Continental Hall in Washington, D.C. is the national headquarters of the Daughters of the American Revolution (DAR). It is located at 1776 D Street NW, sharing a city block with the DAR's later-built Administration Building, and Constitution Hall. Completed in 1910, it is the oldest of the three buildings. It was the site of the 1922 Washington Naval Conference, a major diplomatic event in the aftermath of World War I. The building was declared a National Historic Landmark in 1972. The national headquarters of the Children of the American Revolution is located in the building.

== Description ==
Memorial Continental Hall occupies the eastern third of the city block bounded by C and D, 17th and 18th Streets NW, on the west side of the Ellipse near the White House. It is a two-story masonry structure, built out of brick and concrete whose exterior is clad in Vermont marble with Georgian revival features. Its three street-facing elevations all have monumental two-story porticos with Doric columns. The principal entrance, facing east toward 17th Street and the Ellipse, is extended to function as a porte cochere, with a drive passing under it. The south portico is semi-circular, with thirteen columns.

== History ==
Memorial Continental Hall was commissioned by the DAR in 1902 to be used as a headquarters, assembly hall, and meeting place for DAR conferences. Architect Edward Pearce Casey designed the building, and construction occurred between 1904 and 1910. It was the first of three DAR buildings erected on the same site. The nearby Administration Building was built in 1920, and Constitution Hall was built at the opposite end of the site in 1929. The Administration Building was expanded in 1950 to unite all three buildings.

The final act of the 1913 Woman Suffrage Procession, initiated by Alice Paul, was a meeting at Memorial Continental Hall. Speakers were Anna Howard Shaw, Carrie Chapman Catt, Mary Johnston, and Helen Adams Keller.

Memorial Continental Hall was the site of the Washington Naval Conference in 1921-22, a major diplomatic meeting in which the major powers of the world agreed to limit the sizes and capabilities of their naval forces. In 1943 the hall was loaned to the American Red Cross for emergency wartime work. In 1949, the stage in the auditorium was removed and the room was converted to a library.

== Gallery ==
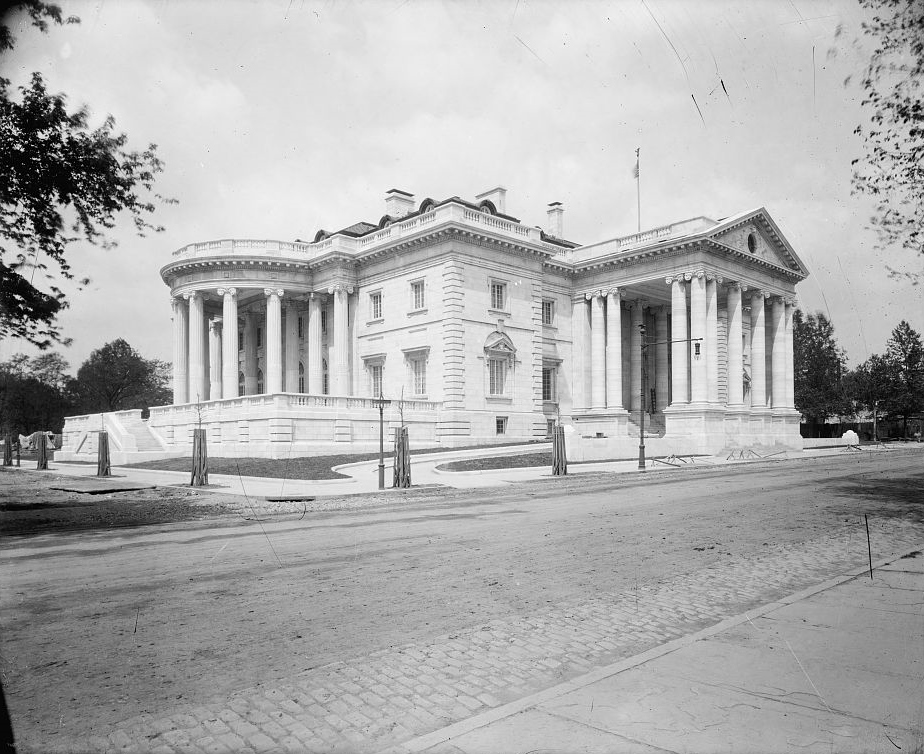
Memorial Continental Hall

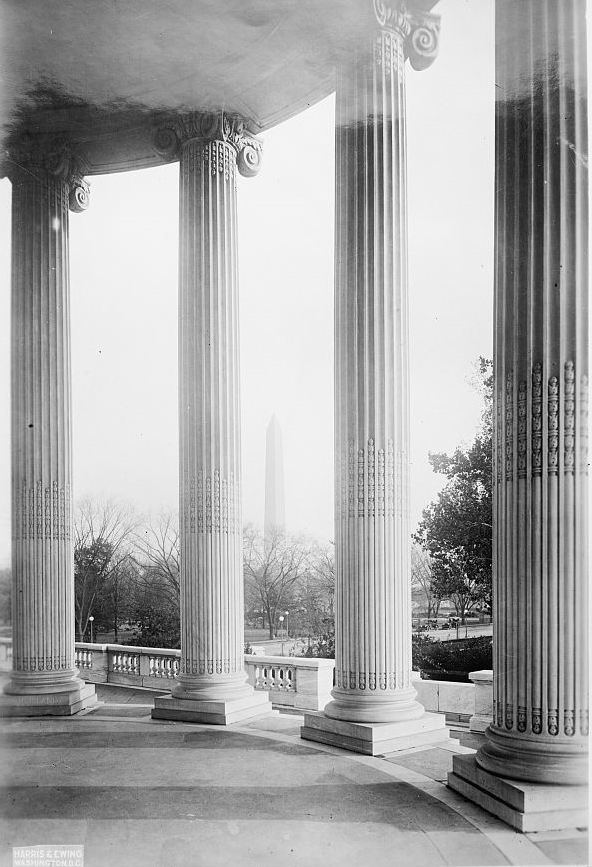
Circa 1916

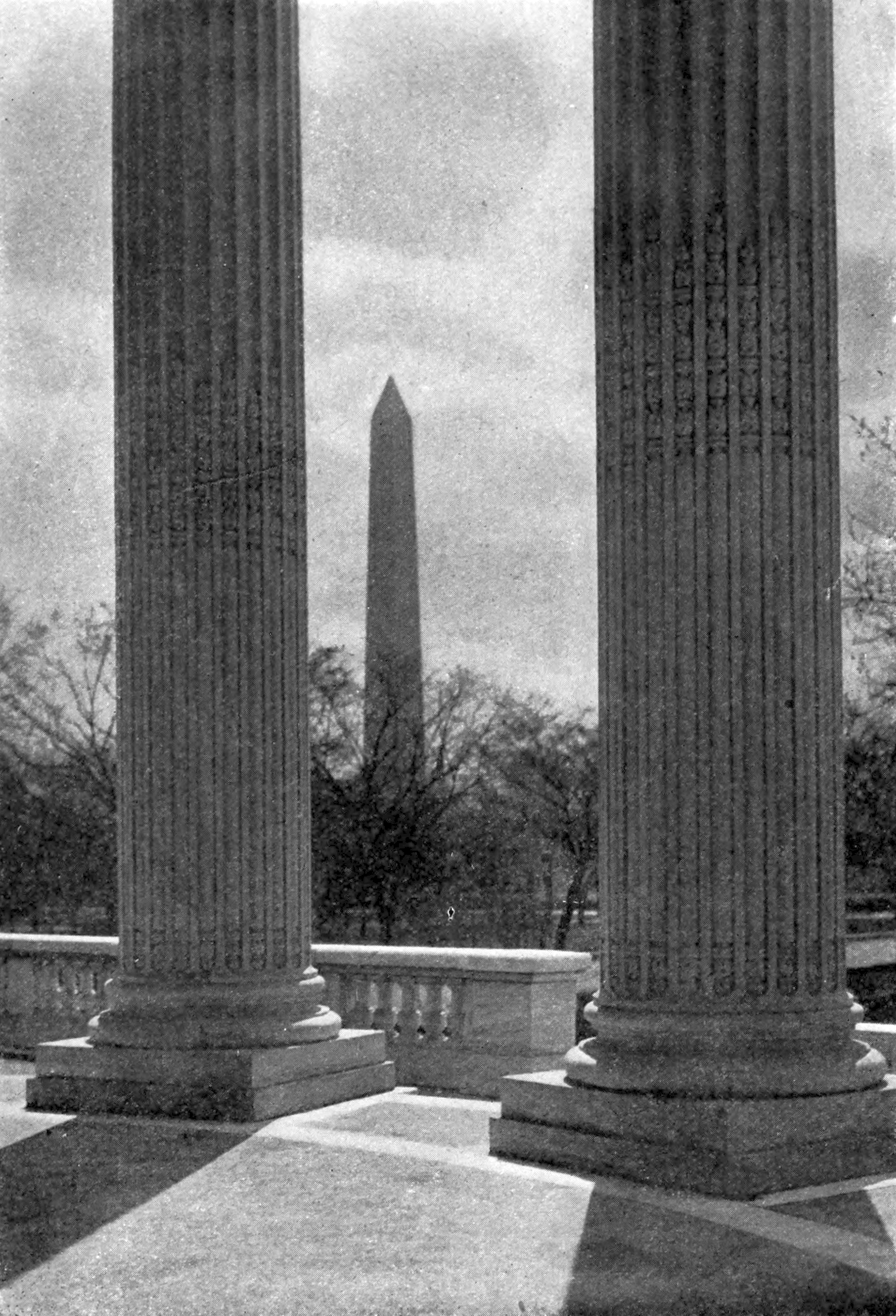
Washington Monument from Memorial Continental Hall, 1917

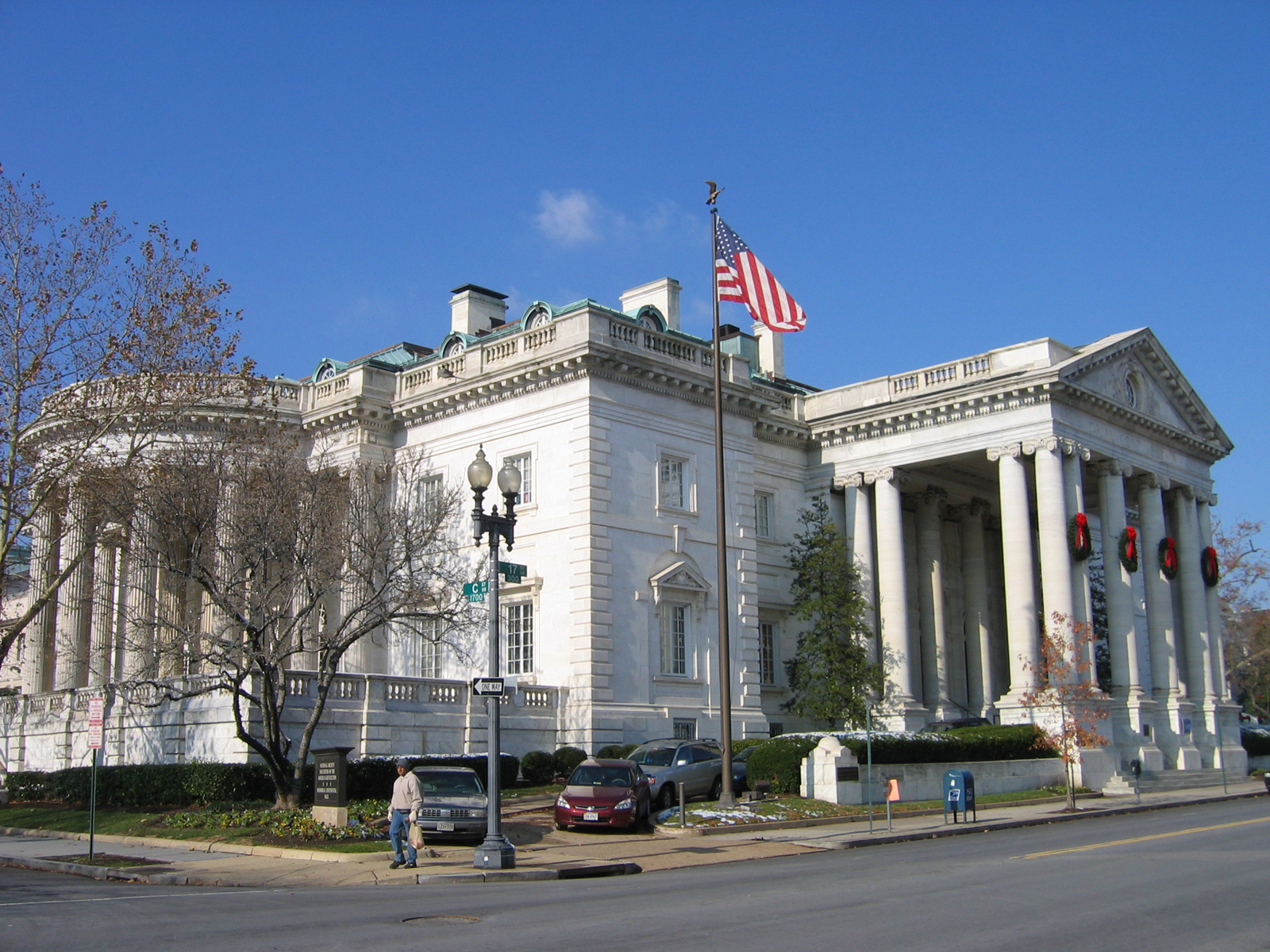
2005

== See also ==
- List of National Historic Landmarks in Washington, D.C.
- National Register of Historic Places listings in central Washington, D.C.
