= Michael A. Cummings =

American artist and quilter

- Born: Michael Arthur Cummings; November 28, 1945 (age 80); Los Angeles, California, U.S.
- Education: Empire College
- Occupation: Visual artist
- Known for: Painting, textile arts, quilting, collage
- Website: michaelcummings.com

Michael Arthur Cummings (born November 28, 1945) is an American visual artist and quilter. He lives in Harlem, New York.

== Early life ==
Cummings grew up in Los Angeles, California, and earned a BA degree in American art history at Empire College. He moved to New York in the early 1970s to take a position with the New York City Department of Cultural Affairs. He worked with event planner Karin Bacon. Cummings spent his early artistic career as a part-time collage (with Romare Bearden as a mentor) and paint artist.

After a work project to create a cloth banner for an exhibition in 1973, Cummings discovered his love for working with fabric and taught himself to quilt by studying the works of local quilters and how-to quilt magazines and books.

Cummings was in a pilot program that created the Studio in a School program in the 1970s. Philanthropist Agnes Gund funded the program and visited the artists many times.

Cummings also worked at the New York State Council on the Arts for many years before retiring.

== Quilting style and career ==
Cummings quilts in the narrative, story-telling tradition and is one of a few nationally known male quiltmakers. His work often features bright, colorful African themes and African American historical themes. Major quilt series include the "African Jazz" series (1990), the "Haitian Mermaid" series (1996), and the "Josephine Baker" series (2000).

The U.S. State Department has posted several of Cummings' quilts in its embassies in Rwanda and Mali through its Art in Embassies program. Absolut Vodka and HBO have commissioned his work, and his work is held in the permanent collection of the Museum of Arts and Design in New York.

== Public collections ==
- Schomburg Center for Research in Black Culture, New York Public Library
- International Quilt Study Center & Museum Quilt House, University of Nebraska-Lincoln (Young Obama + Slave Ship...Henrietta Marie)
- Museum of Art, Michigan State University (African Jazz)
- Museum of Spirits, Stockholm, Sweden (Absolut Jazz)
- Brooklyn Museum, New York, New York (President Obama)
- Museum of Arts and Design, New York City, New York (I'll Fly Away)
- California African American Museum, Los Angeles, California (Springtime in Memphis)
- Renwick Gallery (Smithsonian Institution) Washington, D.C. (Haitian Mermaid)
- Underground Railroad Freedom Center, Cincinnati, Ohio (Harriet Tubman...Leading family to freedom)
- Studio Museum in Harlem, New York, New York ( Nefertiti's World)
- The Obama Presidential Center/Museum, Chicago, IL
- Mattatuck Museum, Waterbury, CT
- Getty Center for Education in the Arts, Los Angeles, Ca

== Women of Color Quilters Network ==
Cummings is a founding member of the Women of Color Quilters Network, founded by Carolyn L. Mazloomi.

== Works illustrated ==
- In the Hollow of Your Hand – collected by Alice McGill, with pictures by Michael Cummings

== Books that include Cummings' quilts ==
- Spirits of the Cloth by Carolyn Mazloomi (1987)
- Always There: The African American Presence in American Quilts' by Cuesta Benberry (1992)
- American Quiltmaking: 1970-2000 by Eleanor Levie (2004)
- Contemporary Quilt Art by Kate Lenkowsky (2008)
- Masters: Art Quilts: Major Works by Leading Artists by Martha Sielman (2008)
- Art Quilt Portfolio: The Natural World by Martha Sielman (2012)
- Tragic Soul-Life by Terrence L. Johnson (2012) - jacket cover
- Art Quilt Portfolio: People & Portraits by Martha Sielman (2013)
- Patchwork & Stitching (2016) - Australian publication
- Quilts and Human Rights by Macdowell, Worrall, Swanson, and Donaldson (2016)
- Cloth 100 Artists: Contemporary & Heritage Techniques by Lena Corwin, 2025
- Quarantine Quilts: Creativity in the Midst of Chaos by Sandra Sider, Schiffer Pub Ltd, 2021

== Awards and honors ==
- Cummings is a recipient of a 2023 National Heritage Fellowship awarded by the National Endowment for the Arts, which is the United States government's highest honor in the folk and traditional arts.
