= Quilt Treasures =

Oral history project about the 20th Century Quilt Revival

The Quilt Treasures Project is an oral history project that documents the stories of a number of notable individuals who moved the 20th Century Quilt Revival forward. These individuals include quilt makers, designers, business people, collectors, publishers, historians, and scholars.

Quilt Treasures seeks to make this documentary material available in two different kinds of media: digitally on the web through web portraits, and mini-documentaries in archival form in a museum repository. These online portraits are intended for the use of researchers and students in the field of quilt history and have been featured in scholarly publications such as Uncoverings and the academic journal of the American Quilt Study Group, as well as in popular magazines for quilters such as the Quilter's Newsletter.

The project is a collaboration of the Alliance for American Quilts, the Michigan State University Museum, and MATRIX: Center for Humane Arts, Letters, and Social Sciences OnLine. Some materials associated with the project are held at the Michigan State University Museum.

== History ==
The first web portrait was about Bonnie Leman, and was published in 2002.

== Web portraits ==
The Quilt Treasures web portraits feature biographies and videotaped interviews, mini-documentaries, photos, a timeline of activities, bibliographies, and other resources relating to each individual. Other components have been developed as needed based on the interviewee’s life and work. These components have included testimonies from friends and colleagues, exhibit histories, teaching portfolios, and poetry.

Individuals currently documented with web portraits include:

- Virginia Avery
- Cuesta Benberry, scholar on the history of African American quilting
- Jinny Beyer, professional quilter and fabric designer
- David and Patricia Crosby, founders of Mississippi Cultural Crossroads
- Joyce Gross, editor and publisher of The Quilt Journal (1977–1987)
- Jean Ray Laury
- Bonnie Leman, founder of Quilter's Newsletter Magazine
- Cy Nelson
- Yvonne Porcella
- Bets Ramsey, co-founder of the Tennessee Quilt Project
- Hystercine Rankin
- Mary Schafer
- Merry Silber
- Woodard and Greenstein

== Impact ==
Many of the individuals documented as Quilt Treasures have had wide-reaching impacts not only within the quilting world, but beyond the field of quilting and quilt history. Cuesta Benberry, for example, was a noted scholar of African American history and culture. Scholars of oral history use the documentaries produced by this project to document and understand various aspects of American culture. One of the most popular mini-documentaries, "On Pimento cheese sandwiches," provides insight into an aspect of Southern culture and foodways.

== Quotes ==
According to Alliance for American Quilts co-founder Shelly Zegart, "Quilt Treasures are the special women and men who were key to the American quilt revival of the 1960s and 1970s, reawakening interest nationwide in the history, craft, and social and aesthetic value of quilts. They ensured the preservation and documentation of quilts through the state and regional quilt projects and they took quilting as a cultural expression to new heights. As creators, teachers, communicators, and links in a growing network, these 'quilt treasures' built an art form and an industry that today involves and touches millions of Americans. As these individuals began to retire from active involvement in the quilt world, an important piece of American social and cultural history was at risk of being lost." (Zegart 2003)

== See also ==
- History of quilting
- International Quilt Museum
- List of quilters
- NAMES Project AIDS Memorial Quilt
- National Quilt Museum
- Quilt Index
- Quilters Hall of Fame
