= Quilt Index =

Searchable database of quilt information

The Quilt Index is a searchable database for scholars, quilters and educators featuring over 50,000 quilts from documentation projects, museums, libraries, and private collections. It also has quilt-related ephemera and curated essays and lesson plans for teachers.

== Functions and operations ==
The overall collection includes quilts made from the early nineteenth century to the twenty-first century, representing a wide range of quilting styles, techniques, purposes, and functions. Users can browse for quilts based on their time period, location of origin, style, purpose, or by the collection in which they are now housed. They can also search for specific quilts by a variety of metadata, including quilting pattern, quilter, and identification number.

=== Facilitators ===
The Alliance for American Quilts (AAQ), Michigan State University (MSU)'s MATRIX: Center for Humane Arts, Letters and Social Sciences Online, and Michigan State University Museum present the Quilt Index. MSU staff members lead project work, in consultation with AAQ, the Quilt Index Task Force, the Quilt Index Editorial Board, and representatives from each contributor. The director is Marsha MacDowell, professor of art, history, and design at MSU.

The project has been supported by major grants from the National Endowment for the Humanities and the Institute for Museum and Library Services.

Contributing partners include:

- The American Folk Art Museum
- American Quilt Study Group
- Connecticut Quilt Search Project
- The Daughters of the American Revolution Museum
- Hawaiian Quilt Research Project
- Illinois Quilt Research Project quilts owned by Illinois State Museum
- State Historical Society of Iowa
- The Kentucky Quilt Project at University of Louisville Archives and Records Center
- The Library of Congress American Folklife Center
- The Louisiana Regional Folklife Program
- The Mary Gasperik Quilts
- MassQuilts: The Massachusetts Quilt Documentation Project
- The Merikay Waldvogel Private Collection
- Michigan Quilt Project and Michigan State University Quilt Collection at Michigan State University Museum and Great Lakes Quilt Center
- Minnesota Quilt Project
- The Mountain Heritage Center
- The Museum of the American Quilter's Society
- New England Quilt Museum Collection
- The Heritage Quilt Project of New Jersey at Rutgers University Libraries and Special Collections
- North Carolina Museum of History
- The International Quilt Study Center and the Nebraska Quilt Project at the University of Nebraska-Lincoln
- Quilts of Tennessee at Tennessee State Library and Archives
- Rhode Island Quilt Documentation Project at the University of Rhode Island
- Rocky Mountain Quilt Museum
- The Signature Quilt Project
- Texas Quilt Search and the Winedale Quilt Collection at the Center for American History, University of Texas at Austin
- West Virginia Heritage Quilt Search
- The Wilene Smith Private Collection
- Wyoming Quilt Project, Inc.

=== Copyright ===
Contributors to the Quilt Index retain copyright to their contributions of data (both text and images), and agree to permanently license these contributions to the Quilt Index to display on the website for educational purposes.

== History ==
The Quilt Index was first launched in 2003.

== Collections, essays and exhibits ==
Although the Quilt Index is not an actual museum site with in-house collections, the Index does have online exhibitions which highlight works in its digital collection.

These include:

- Since Kentucky: Surveying State Quilts
- Mary Schafer: Quilter, Quilt Collector, and Quilt Historian
- Redwork: An American Textile Tradition
- Mary Gasperik (1888-1969): Her Life And Her Quilts
- Researching Signature Quilts

== Wiki ==
The Quilt Index Wiki, which became live in August 2008, is a collaborative, user-generated tool for quilters and quilt scholars featuring information about state and provincial quilt documentation projects, including publication lists and locations where records are housed. The wiki also provides an expanding directory of museums with quilt collections, and information about those collections. Users can also add information about local, regional and national oral history projects relating to quilt history to the wiki.The wiki is powered by MediaWiki software. Although not fully WYSIWYG, instructions for editing the wiki are available on its main page.

== Works ==
=== Conference presentations ===
- Justine Richardson, Dean Rehberger, Marsha MacDowell, Amanda Sikarskie, Mary Worrall, "The Quilt Index Goes 2.0: A Fiberspace Case Study," Presented: April 16, 2009, at Museums and the Web 2009.
- Marsha MacDowell and Mary Worrall, "The Quilt Index: Documenting and Accessing an American Art," poster session, College Art Association, Los Angeles, accepted for presentation in February 2009.
- Mark Kornbluh, The Quilt Index: Online Tools and Ephemera Expansion, Let's Do I.t. RIght! Museum Computer Network 36th Annual Conference Program, Washington, D.C., November 14, 2008.
- Marsha MacDowell, "The Quilt Index and Quilt Treasures: New Tools for American Art and Art History Research and Education," Department of Art and Art History Faculty Lecture Series, November 11, 2008.
- Mary Worrall. "Documenting Quilting Traditions: Sharing Stories and Stitches." Michigan Oral History Association. Rogers City, Michigan, November 2008.
- Marsha MacDowell, "The Quilt Index: A Tool for Preservation, Collection Management, Education, and Research," Cooperstown Graduate Association, Cooperstown, NY, Oct. 4, 2008.
- Mary Worrall, Marsha MacDowell and Justine Richardson. "The Quilt Index: Communicating Stories in the Stitches." Textile Society of America Biennial Symposium. Honolulu, Hawaii, September 2008.
- Mary Worrall, “Textiles and Technology: The Quilt Index as a National Model for Online Thematic Collections,” Michigan Museums Association, Flint, MI, 2006.
- Mary Worrall, “Piecing History: Quilt Documentation and the Quilt Index,” Florida Museum of Natural History, Gainesville, FL, 2006.
- Marsha MacDowell, Mary Worrall, Patricia Crews, Jennifer Gilbert, Justine Richardson, “Stitching Data: The Quilt Index as a National Model for Online Thematic Collections Session,” American Association of Museums Annual Meeting and Expo, Boston, MA, April 29, 2006.

=== Publications ===
- Justine Richardson; Dean Rehberger; Marsha MacDowell; Amanda Sikarskie; Mary Worrall (31 March 2009). "The Quilt Index Goes 2.0: A Fiberspace Case Study, Published in J. Trant and D. Bearman (eds)". Museums and the Web 2009: Proceedings. Toronto: Archives & Museum Informatics.
- Justine Richardson; Michael Fegan; Mark Kornbluh; Marsha MacDowell (April 2004). "Bits & Bolts to Bits & Bytes: The Quilt Index Online Repository and Distributed Archival Management System". Museums and the Web Online Conference Proceedings. Washington, DC.

== See also ==
- List of quilters
