= Peggie Hartwell =

American quilter and educator

- Born: Peggie Hartwell; January 9, 1939; Springfield, South Carolina
- Known for: Quilting
- Website: peggiehartwell.com

Peggie Lois Hartwell, (born 1939) is a fourth-generation African-American quilter and educator. She currently lives in Summerville, South Carolina. She serves on the national board of the Women of Color Quilters Network.

== Personal life ==
Peggie Hartwell grew up on a farm with a large, extended family. She was born in 1939 in Springfield, South Carolina. The women were skilled quiltmakers, and the men were accomplished practitioners in the ancient tradition of oral storytelling.

Hartwell's family, along with many other southern African-American families, moved north as part of the Great Migration. Hartwell completed her education in urban New York City.

== Performance work ==
Hartwell studied with legendary dance master Syvilla Fort of New York City. She also obtained a B.A. in Theater from Queens College. She then spent nearly eight years performing Jazz, Modern Primitive and Modern dance techniques throughout Europe and the Middle East.

== Visual artwork ==
Hartwell developed as a quilt artist after leaving performance art, while also holding a day job at a brokerage firm. Her work is mostly autobiographical, drawing upon the continuous exposure to folk-life customs and traditions she had in her youth.

Her piece "African Skies and Southern Soil" can be found in the collection of the Museum of Arts and Design.

In 1996, Hartwell received a grant from the National Quilting Association, Inc. to create a ten quilt series that recorded her South Carolina childhood and farm experiences.

== Education and career ==
Hartwell has a B.A. in Theater from Queens College, Queens, N.Y. She also has a Certificate of Completion: Artists in Classrooms, Developing Strategies for Working with Students with Disabilities from S.C. School for the Deaf and Blind, Spartanburg, S.C.. She is on the Roster as a Master Artist for Opus Inc., Hartford, CT. She is also on the Roster as Artist in the Classroom for the State of South Carolina.

== Selected exhibitions ==
=== Solo exhibitions ===
- "A Quilter's Spirit," YMI Culture Arts Center, Asheville, NC, 2000.
- "Vanished Images," New York Founding Hospital, New York, NY, 2000

=== Group exhibitions ===
- "Threads of Faith," Beach Institute for African American Art & Culture Savannah, GA 2006
- "Threads of Faith," Cincinnati Museum Center, Cincinnati, OH, 2005
- "Threads of Faith," Gallery of the American Bible Society, New York, NY, 2004.
- "Sixth Annual Quilting Weekend," Frost Valley YMCA, Claryville, NY, 2002
- "Stories in Art," Middlebury College, Middlebury, VT, 2001

== Videography ==
=== Quilted Conscience ===
Quilted Conscience is the story of 16 Sudanese girls who landed with their families in Grand Island, and is "an uplifting film about finding a new life through art", which made its premier on, June 14, on NET1/HD. Filmmaker John Sorensen documented the girls' journey as new Americans as they participated in an arts project with a local quilters guild, guided by nationally known African-American quilt-maker, Peggie Hartwell.

Hartwell is also featured in The Cloth Sings to Me (1995) and The Spirit of the Individual (1997); both are about textile artists in New York and produced by Esperanza Martinez and Linda Roennau.

She was also interviewed by host LeVar Burton on Reading Rainbow, and spoke of her quiltmaking and cultural legacy.

== Organizations ==
Ms. Hartwell is a member of the National Chapter of the Women of Color Quilters Network (WCQN), where she serves on the board. She is also a member of the American Quilt Society (AQS), and of the National Quilting Association (NQA).
