= Roland Freeman =

American photographer (1936–2023)

Roland L. Freeman
- Born: July 27, 1936; Baltimore, Maryland, U.S.
- Died: August 7, 2023 (aged 87); Washington, D.C., U.S.
- Occupations: Photographer, quilter
- Works: The Arabbers of Baltimore, A Communion of the Spirits: African-American Quilters, Preservers, and Their Stories
- Spouse: Marcia F. Freeman (m. 1968)
- Awards: National_Heritage_Fellowship
- Website: www.tgcd.org

Roland L. Freeman (July 27, 1936 – August 7, 2023) was an American photographer and documenter of Southern folk culture and African-American quilters. He was the president of The Group for Cultural Documentation, founded in 1991 and based in Washington, D.C.

== Early life ==
Roland L. Freeman was born in Baltimore, Maryland, on July 27, 1936. As a youth, his future life's work was inspired when he discovered the Depression-era photography of Gordon Parks and Roy DeCarava, which focused on raising social consciousness, as well as the work of Farm Security Administration photographers. When Freeman was 14, he met author and folklorist Zora Neale Hurston, who would also be a great influence on his subsequent career.

Freeman served in the US Air Force from 1954 to 1958. He began taking photographs in the Washington, D.C. area in 1963, inspired by the March on Washington.

== Career as photodocumentarian ==
In 1968, he not only participated in but also documented the Poor People's Campaign and the Mule Train trip from Marks, Mississippi, to the nation's capital.

Freeman worked as a stringer for Time and Magnum Photos, including coverage as a White House photographer. In 1997, Freeman was named the Eudora Welty Visiting Professor of Southern Studies at Millsaps College in Jackson, Mississippi.

In 1970, he co-directed the Mississippi FolkLife Project for the Smithsonian Institution's Center for Folklife and Cultural Heritage. In 1972, he became a research associate there.

In that capacity, Freeman photographed staff at the White House, including Mrs. Lillian Rogers Parks, who worked there for 30 years. Several of Freeman's photographs of African Americans at the White House were included in official White House webpages and in a Smithsonian Institution exhibition.

Freeman retained close ties to his hometown of Baltimore, a frequent subject of his work. The Arabbers of Baltimore, published in 1989, documents the work of fruit and vegetable vendors and their horse drawn carts, including Freeman's uncle. He also led the Jonestown Community Photo Documentation Project from 1994-1996. Sponsored by the Baltimore City Life Museum, Freeman trained 19 children how to use cameras and develop their own film; the children documented their families, their lives, and their neighborhood of Jonestown, Baltimore.

Freeman's work was included in the 2025 exhibition Photography and the Black Arts Movement, 1955–1985 at the National Gallery of Art.

=== "While There is Still Time" ===
Freeman worked for years on a self-assigned project "While There Is Still Time," a study of Black culture throughout the African Diaspora. He used the camera as a tool to research, document and interpret the continuity of traditional African-American folklife practices. This work is generally done in close collaboration with folklorists, historians, sociologists and community activists, often in methodologically innovative ways that have been integral to his contributions to the work of photographers of his generation.

== Influence on American quilt history ==
Freeman spent more than 20 years photographing African-American quilters and guilds. He collected biographic information about the quilters' lives and their motivations for quiltmaking. He also documented collectors of African-American-made quilts.

A Communion of the Spirits was a landmark American quilt history book, as no one else prior to Freeman had performed a national survey of Black quilters. The book covered 38 states and the District of Columbia. Quilt guilds documented in A Communion of the Spirits include: The African American Quilters of Baltimore, the Freedom Quilting Bee of Alberta, Alabama, the African American Quilters of Los Angeles, and more. Quilt collectors included Nikki Giovanni, Maya Angelou, and Beverly Guy-Sheftall.

An exhibit of Freeman's quilt photographs are in the permanent collection of the Smith Robertson Museum in Jackson, Mississippi.

In 2008, he organized a quilt exhibition at the Historical Society of Washington, D.C. to celebrate the inauguration of President Obama. The exhibit was supposed to run from January 11 to January 31, 2009, but it was extended until July 2009.

== Death ==
Freeman died at his home in Washington, D.C., on August 7, 2023, at the age of 87.

== Published works ==
=== Books ===
- Folkroots: Images of Mississippi Black Folklife, 1974–1976 (1977)
- Roland L. Freeman, a Baltimore Portfolio, 1968–1979 (1979)
- Southern Roads/City Pavements: Photographs of Black Americans (1981)
- The Arabbers of Baltimore (1989)
- Margaret Walker's 'For My People': A Tribute (1992)
- A Communion of the Spirits: African-American Quilters, Preservers, and Their Stories (1996)
- The Mule Train: A Journey of Hope Remembered (1998)
- A Tribute to Worth Long (2006)

=== Exhibition catalogs ===
- City Pavements, Country Roads (1978, Antioch University)
- Something to Keep You Warm (1981, Mississippi State Historical Museum)
- More Than Just Something to Keep You Warm (1988, Bergen Museum of Art & Science)
- Stand By Me: African American Expressive Culture in Philadelphia, (1989, Smithsonian Institution, Office of Folklife Programs)
- Some Thing of Value: Images of African and African-American Folklife (1992, APEX Museum)
- Journey of the Spirit: the Art of Gwendolyn A. Magee (2004, Mississippi Museum of Art)

=== Contributions ===
- Piney Woods School: an Oral History (1982)
- Inside Out: Photographs from Lorton (1986)
- Drawing Our Worlds Together (1998)
- Fire In My Bones (2000)

== Awards and honors ==
- In 1970, Freeman became the first photographer to be awarded a Young Humanist Fellowship by the National Endowment for the Humanities.
- He has received two Masters of Photography Visual Arts Fellowships from the National Endowment for the Arts, one in 1982 and another in 1991.
- He received the Living Legend Award for Distinguished Achievement in Photography from the National Black Arts Festival in 1994.
- In 1997, he received an Honorary Doctorate in Humane Letters from Millsaps College.
- In 2001, the book Fire In My Bones, to which Freeman contributed the photographs, earned the Chicago Folklore Prize, an annual award which represents the most outstanding book in folklore.
- He was a recipient of a 2007 National Heritage Fellowship awarded by the NEA, which is the United States government's highest honor in the folk and traditional arts.

== Collections ==
The Roland L. Freeman Collection was acquired in 2023 by the Wilson Special Collections Library at the University of North Carolina at Chapel Hill. The collection, a gift from the Kohler Foundation, is part of the Southern Folklife Collection and consists of Freeman's papers, nearly 24,000 slides, 10,000 photographic prints, 400,000 negatives and 9,000 contact sheets.

Also in 2023, the Mississippi Museum of Art in Jackson acquired 131 quilts collected by Roland Freeman illustrating quilt-making by African-American women, many from Southern American communities, from Liberia and South Africa. The quilt collection was a gift from the Kohler Foundation.

In 1991, the Smithsonian American Art Museum acquired ten black and white prints by Roland L. Freeman as a gift from George H. Dalsheimer.

Roland Freeman’s African American Expressive Culture in Philadelphia Project is housed at the Library of Congress Prints & Photographs Division and includes 737 enlarged contact sheets full of images of African-American everyday life in Philadelphia, Pennsylvania, in the late 1980s.
