= Cuesta Benberry =

American art historian (1923–2007)

- Born: September 8, 1923; Cincinnati, Ohio, U.S.
- Died: August 23, 2007 (aged 83)
- Occupations: Art historian; scholar
- Spouse: George L. Benberry (m. 1951)
- Children: 1

Academic background
- Education: Stowe Teachers College; University of Missouri–St. Louis MLS)

Cuesta Benberry (September 8, 1923 – August 23, 2007) was an American historian and scholar. Considered to be one of the pioneers of research on quiltmaking in America, she was the pioneer of research on African-American quiltmaking. Her involvement in quilt research spans from founding and participating in various quilt groups to writing articles in renowned quilt magazines and journals. As a quilt scholar, Benberry acquired a collection of important quilts dating from the late 19th century up to the 21st century, as well as an extensive collection of paper documents supplementing quilting exhibitions, books, articles and her personal research.

== Life ==
Cuesta Ray Benberry was born in Cincinnati, Ohio and raised in St. Louis, Missouri. Benberry obtained a bachelor's degree in education from Stowe Teachers College (now Harris-Stowe State University). She later earned her MLS in library science from the University of Missouri at St. Louis. She worked in the St. Louis public schools for 40 years and retired from her job in 1985. She married George L. Benberry in 1951.

A visit to Kentucky to see her husband's family exposed Cuesta to quilts. She did not necessarily want to make the quilts, but was inclined to study the quilts. Mrs. Benberry looked at the individual in quiltmaking and African-American quiltmaking. She made extensive leaps in quilt research, especially in African-American quiltmaking.

In the early 1970s Benberry started to write for a small magazine based in Sapulpa, Oklahoma, Nimble Needle Treasures, which was unusual in that it published articles as well as patterns. When it was wound up in 1975 she began to write instead for Quilter's Newsletter, then the only magazine of its kind.

Cuesta Benberry died on August 23, 2007, at the age of 83. She was survived by her husband, her son, two grandchildren and two great-grandchildren.

== Research ==
With her education and professional background in teaching, Benberry understood the nuances of teaching in an academic setting, as well as acquiring research capabilities from her graduate studies in library science. Benberry's academic background greatly contributed to her success as a quilt historian.

Benberry's interest in quilting began with her husband's family, who introduced her into the world of quilting as part of their family traditions. She was fascinated by the significance that quilts held in people's lives, "They're on the bed. They're there at birth. They're there at death. They're part of the marriage bed. They're part of our lives, and they give us so many memories… You'd call a quilt as you would a child. [Her mother-in-law would] lift up a trunk lid and say, 'Come see my Sugar Bowl'; she didn't say, 'Come see my blue and white quilt.' Then I wanted to learn more about their history." It was the emotional connection that quilts held in her husband's family that intrigued Benberry to explore the historical significance of quiltmaking in America.

=== Research focus ===
The information acquired through Benberry's research included information about African-American quiltmaking, to which she eventually narrowed her research focus. There was little previous research done on African-American quiltmaking so in addition to sorting through her own research and exhausting library resources, Benberry began to interview African-American quilt-makers and gathered information about slave-made quilts, as well as their personal take on the role of African-American quilt-makers in the realm of American quilt history. Benberry ventured away from previous theories on African-American quilt making that suggested visual criteria were the main determinant in qualifying a quilt as African-American. She countered the theories on African-American quilts being determined by one visual style (improvisational) by noting in her comprehensive research the differences in technique throughout several African-American quilts.

Benberry attributes the increased interest in African-American quiltmaking to three specific events:

- the inclusion of Harriet Powers' Bible Quilt in Selections of Nineteenth Century Afro-American Art at the Metropolitan Museum of Art by Regina Perry
- the essay "Harriet Powers: Portrait Quilter" written by Gladys-Marie Fry published in Missing Pieces: Georgia Folk Art, 1770–1776
- the Mississippi quilt exhibition "More Than Just Something to Keep You Warm" by Roland Freeman.

=== Research methods ===
During her research, Benberry kept detailed notes, files, catalogues, correspondences and many other additional paper documents that are now being sorted and used as reference material for people interested in quilt research.

Benberry used the resources around her in St. Louis to begin her research. She started at the St. Louis Public Library, the Washington University Library, the library at St. Louis University, and the St. Louis Mercantile Library at the University of Missouri-St. Louis. She immediately discovered that St. Louis was the center for manufacturing stamped goods for needlework, leading her to look into the commercial side of quiltmaking.

In order to gain a quilter's perspective into quiltmaking, Benberry joined various round robin groups (pattern exchanges). Because Cuesta herself was not a quilt-maker, the members of these networks would often send her completed blocks so she could see what they should look like. By joining round robin groups, Benberry developed friendships with active quilters and found a network of people also interested in studying quilt history.

Delores Hinson was one of the many friendships fostered by Benberry's interaction with various quilting networks. Hinson encouraged Benberry to research further into the history and significance behind the quilt block designs, as well as advised her to publish her research and knowledge of quiltmaking and its history.

In 1986, Benberry went to England to work and study with the Zamani Soweto Council, a group of black South African women. These women were brought to England from South Africa to teach them quilting skills in hopes they would learn a profitable skill to become economically independent. Upon returning to the United States, Benberry began a lecture circuit featuring the Zamani Soweto Council, bringing attention to the apartheid struggle.

== Legacy ==
Benberry is probably best known for her writing about the diverse contributions to quilting by African-Americans. Her books and articles include:

- Always There: The African-American Presence in American Quilts (1992)
- Piece of My Soul: Quilts by Black Arkansans (2000)
- 20th Century Quilts 1900-1970: Women Make Their Mark (1997)
- A Patchwork of Pieces: An Anthology of Early Quilt Stories, 1845–1940 (1993)
- "Afro-American Women and Quilts: An Introductory Essay", a landmark article published in Uncoverings, 1980, ed. Sally Garoutte.

Benberry also wrote the foreword to quilt history books such as Hidden in Plain View: A Secret Story of Quilts and the Underground Railroad (1999) by Jacqueline Tobin and Raymond Dobard, A Communion of the Spirit: African-American Quilters, Preservers, and Their Stories (1996) by Roland Freeman, Black Threads: An African American Quilting Sourcebook (2002) by Kyra E. Hicks, and Journey of the Spirit: the Art of Gwendolyn A. Magee (2004), edited by René Paul Barilleaux.

Benberry was inducted into the Quilters Hall of Fame in 1983. She was a founding member of the American Quilt Study Group and the Women of Color Quilter's Network.

== Benberry's collection ==
In 2009, Michigan State University Museum acquired Benberry's extensive American and African-American quilt ephemera and quilt history collections as well as her quilt kit collection. From December 6, 2009, to December 12, 2010, the museum hosted the exhibit, "Unpacking Collections: The Legacy of Cuesta Benberry, An African American Quilt Scholar."

The collection contained:

- 52 quilts from her personal collection
- over 100 quilt kits
- extensive research files on African-American history, African-American artists, museums and exhibitions with an African-American focus, African-American and African quiltmaking
- files dedicated to quilt making which include articles from academic journals, newspaper clippings, book chapters, magazines, notes, photographs, exhibition materials and correspondences.

Benberry's collection is a testament to her efforts to explore all aspects associated with African-American quiltmaking, simultaneously putting them in context within American politics and African-American historical events.

== Quilt research papers ==
- "Afro-American Women and Quilts," Uncoverings, 1980
- "White Perceptions of Blacks in Quilts and Related Media," Uncoverings, 1983
- "Quilt Cottage Industries: A Chronology," Uncoverings, 1986
- "The Nationalization of Pennsylvania-Dutch Quilt Patterns in the 1940s to 1960s," Bits and Pieces: Textile Traditions. Ed. Jeannette Lasansky, Lewisburg, PA: Oral Traditions Project, 1991. p. 80-89.
- "Afro-American Slave Quilts and the British Connection," America in Britain, American Museum in Britain, Claverton Manor (Bath, England). Vol. XXV, Nos. 2 and 3 (1987).
- "Marie Webster: Indiana's Gift to Quilts," Chapter four in Quilts of Indiana: Crossroads of Memories. Goldman, Marilyn and Marguerite Wiebusch, et al. Bloomington, IN: Indiana University Press. 1991.
- "Quilt Cottage Industries: A Chronicle," Quiltmaking in America: Beyond the Myths. ed. Laurel Horton. Nashville, TN: Rutledge Hill Press, 1994. p. 142-155.
- "African American Quilts: Paradigms of Diversity," International Review of African American Art. Hampton University Museum. Hampton, VA. Vol 12 No. 3. Winter 1995.
- "The Threads of African American Quilters are Woven Into History," African American Quiltmaking in Michigan. MacDowell, Marsha, ed. East Lansing, MI: Michigan State University Press in collaboration with the Michigan State University Museum. 1997.

== Articles in publications ==
- The American Quilter Magazine (KY)
  - "A Style of Their Own: Two Black Quiltmakers", Spring 1988.
  - "Reflections On A Favorite Quilt: African Jazz: In Black and White", Winter 1991.
- American Visions Magazine (Washington, D.C.)
- Blanket Statements, AQSG Newsletter (NE)
- Canada Quilts (Sudbury, Ontario, Canada)
  - "Bible Quilts: Twentieth Century Style" Parts 1 and 2, Issue 17, March 1977; Issue 18, April 1977.
- Center for the History of American Needlework, CHAN (PA)
- Needlecraft magazine: Needlework Press Series, Vol. 2, no. 1, February 1978.
- Modern Priscilla Magazine: Needlework Press Series, Vol. 2, no. 3, August 1978
- Essence Magazine (NY)
- International Review of African American Art (Hampton, VA)
- Lady's Circle Patchwork Quilts (NY)
  - "Missouri: 20th Century Quilt Pattern Supplier", Issue no. 57, May 1988.
- Nimble Needle Treasure Magazine (OK)
  - "Ballad: Hatfield-McCoy Victory Quilt", Vol. 2, no. 2, June 1970.
  - "Victory Quilts" Parts 1 and 2, Vol. 1, no. 3, September 1970; Vol. 2, no. 4,
  - "Ladies Art Co.: Pioneer in Printed Quilt Patterns", Vol. 3, no. 1, March 1971.
  - "The Superb Mrs. Stenge", Vol. 3, no. 2, June 1971.
  - "Quilt Patterns from a WPA Artist Project", Vol. 3, no. 3, September 1971.
  - "The Index of American Design", Vol. 4, no. 1, February 1972.
  - "Quilts in the Museum of History and Technology," Smithsonian Institution. Washington, DC. Vol. 4 no. 2, May 1972.
  - "Quilt Patterns of the Late Victorian Era" Parts 1, 2, 3, 4: Vol. 4, no. 3, August 1972; Vol. 4, no. 4, November 1972; Vol. 5, no. 1, February 1973; Vol. 5, no. 2, May 1973; Vol. 5, no. 3, September 1973.
  - "Quilt Kits, Present and Past" Parts 1, 2, 3 vol. 6, nos. 2 and 3 1974; December 1974; Vol. 7, no. 1, 1975.
- Quilters' Journal (CA)
  - "The Folklore Archives at Southern Illinois University: Quilt Block Collection", Spring 1978.
  - "The Paradox of the Sunbonnet Girl Quilt Pattern", Vol. 2, no. 1, Spring 1979.
  - "Hatfield-McCoy Victory Quilt", Vol. 2, no. 3, Fall 1979.
  - "Found: Missing Stearns and Foster Quilt Patterns" Parts 1 and 2, Vol. 4, no. 1; Vol. 4, no. 2.
- Quilter's Newsletter Magazine (CO)
  - "A Pattern of American Indian Origin" no. 110 March 1979.
  - "The 20th Century's First Quilt Revival" Parts 1, 2, 3 no. 114 July/August 1979; no. 115 Sept. 1979; no. 116 Oct. 1979.
  - "Charm Quilts", no. 120, March 1980.
  - "A Quilt Research Surprise", no. 134, July/August 1981.
  - "A Quilt for Queen Victoria", no. 189, February 1987.
  - "The Face Behind the Familiar Name: Barbara Bannister", no. 200, March 1988. p. 26.
  - "The Story Tellers: African American Quilts Come to the Fore", no. 227, November 1990.
- St. Louis Post-Dispatch (MO)
- Women of Color Quilters' Network Newsletter (OH)

== Curated exhibits ==
- May 12–16, 1993 - Always There: The African-American Presence in American Quilts at the American Folk Art Museum in New York City.
- 1991 - Hear My Quilt, at the St. Louis Art Museum
- 1970 - 20th Century Quilts: 1900-1970: Women Make Their Mark at the Museum of American Quilter's Society in Paducah, Kentucky, with Joyce Gross.
- Curatorial consultant to the Old State House Museum in Arkansas.
