= Redwork =

Form of American embroidery

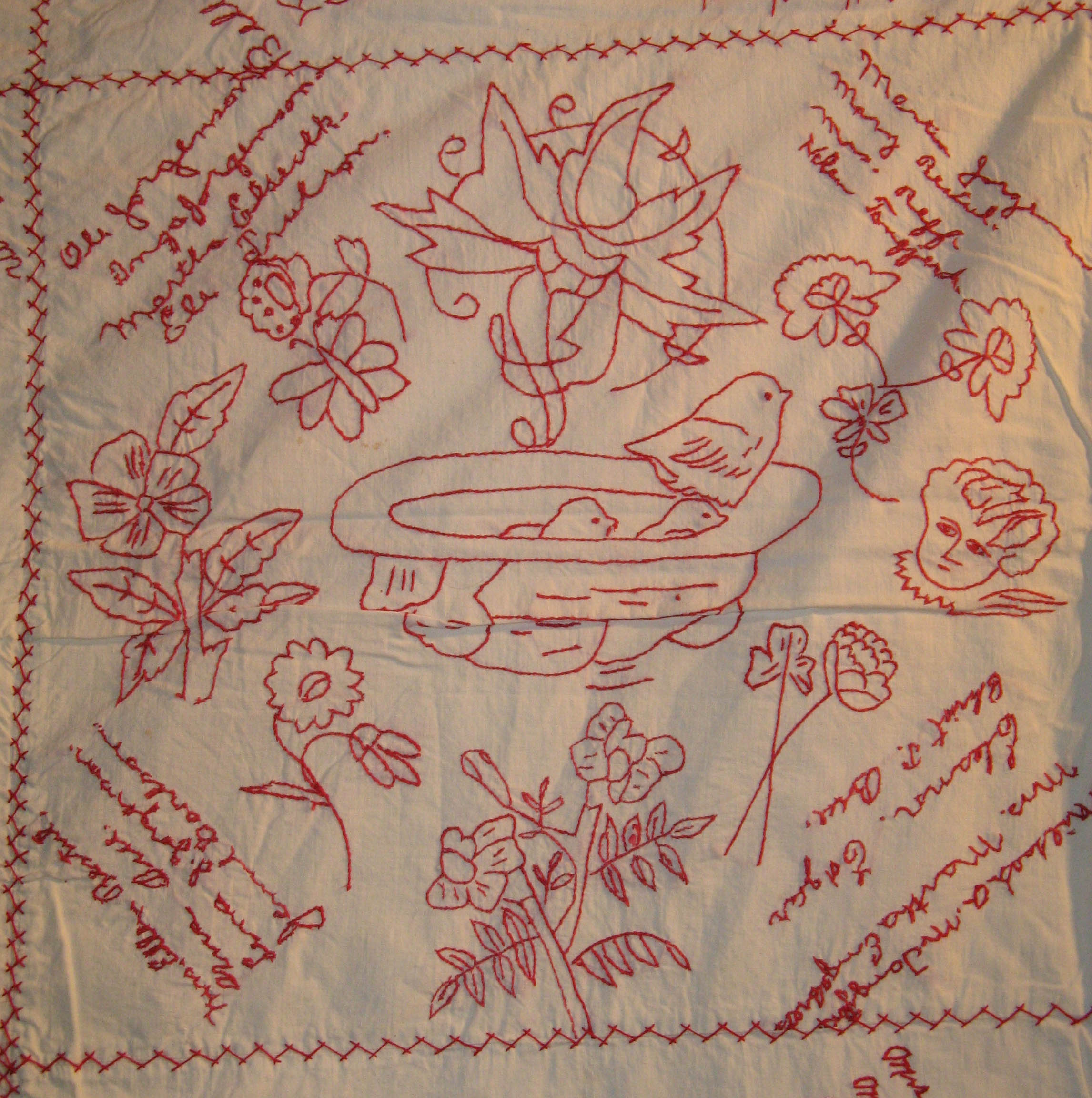
Close up of panel from a redwork bed cover (Shevlin, 1908). Now in the collection of the Minnesota Historical Society.

Redwork is a form of American embroidery, also called art needlework, that developed in the 19th century and was particularly popular between 1855 and 1925. It traditionally uses red thread, chosen because red dyes were the first commercially available colorfast dyes, in the form of Turkey red embroidery floss. Redwork designs are composed of simple stitches and were mainly used to decorate household objects in the 19th and 20th centuries, especially quilts. Patterns for individual quilt blocks were sold for a penny in the United States, making them popular and affordable. In the 21st century, redwork has seen a resurgence among crafters. The main stitch used in redwork is backstitch or outline stitching, formerly known as Kensington stitch. Redwork was a common introductory form of embroidery taught to children in the 19th and 20th century. Children would make quilts decorated with redwork motifs, with motifs of various sizes prior to approximately 1910 and uniform sizes after that year. It was also a way for women with skills in pattern stamping or embroidery to generate their own source of income from the home.

The motifs used in redwork were specific to the item embroidered: water motifs would be used on backsplash cloths, the words "good night" and "good morning" used on quilts, and chairs on upholstered items. The most popular designs found in early redwork (prior to 1900) include Japanese inspired imagery, children, toys, animals and insects, and elaborately coiffed women, some of which were adapted from designs made for crazy quilts. After the turn of the 20th century, Beatrix Potter characters and animals were the most popular. In the 1910s, tea-towel motifs were adapted into redwork designs, including calendrical themes and kitchenware. The following decade saw the predominance of state birds and state flowers.

== See also ==
- Blackwork
- Whitework embroidery
