= Gladys-Marie Fry =

American art historian and educator

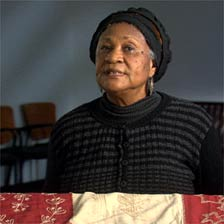
- Born: April 6, 1931; Washington, D.C., U.S.
- Died: November 7, 2015 (aged 84); Silver Spring, Maryland, U.S.
- Education: Howard University, Indiana University
- Relatives: Louis Edwin Fry Sr. (father)
- Writing career
- Genres: Historian, folklorist

Gladys-Marie Fry (April 6, 1931 – November 7, 2015) was Professor Emerita of Folklore and English at the University of Maryland, College Park, Maryland, and a leading authority on African American textiles. Fry earned her bachelor's and master's degrees from Howard University and her Ph.D. from Indiana University. She is the author of Stitched From the Soul: Slave Quilting in the Ante-Bellum South and Night Riders in Black Folk History. A contributor or author to 8 museum catalogs, Fry is also the author of a number of articles and book chapters. Fry has also served as the curator for 11 museum exhibitions (including the Smithsonian in Washington, DC) and consultant to exhibits and television programs around the nation.

== Biography ==
Gladys-Marie Fry was born on April 6, 1931, in Washington, D.C., in the Freedmen's Hospital on the Howard University campus, where her father was Chairman of the Architectural Department. Her father, Louis Edwin Fry Sr., was an eminent architect. He married Obelia Swearingen in 1927. They had a son, Louis Jr., in 1928 (also an architect, who died in 2006).

She spent many years researching enslaved African culture with a special emphasis on the material artifacts of enslaved African women, while earning degrees in history and folklore at Howard University and a PhD at Indiana University.

Fry was a Bunting Institute Fellow from 1988 to 1989 at Radcliffe College, Cambridge, Massachusetts, and retired professor emerita from the University of Maryland, College Park in 2000.

Fry was a frequent lecturer at educational institutions in the United States and abroad. She curated a dozen exhibitions that have been hosted at major institutions. Among them are the Eva and Morris Feld Gallery of the Museum of American Folk Art at Lincoln Square in New York City, the Renwick Gallery and the Anacostia Museum of Art of the Smithsonian Institution, Washington, DC, Huntsville Museum of Art, Huntsville, Alabama, Afro-American Museum of Art, Dallas, Texas, and the Art Gallery at the University of Maryland.

Fry is famous for the following two seminal folklore works:

- Stitched from the Soul: Slave Quilts from the Ante-Bellum South
  - This richly illustrated book offers a glimpse into the lives and creativity of African American quilters during the era of slavery. Originally published in 1989, Stitched from the Soul was the first book to examine the history of quilting in the enslaved community and to place slave-made quilts into historical and cultural context. It remains a beautiful and moving tribute to an African American tradition. Undertaking a national search to locate slave-crafted textiles, Gladys-Marie Fry uncovered a treasure trove of pieces. The 123 color and black and white photographs featured here highlight many of the finest and most interesting examples of the quilts, woven coverlets, counterpanes, rag rugs, and crocheted artifacts attributed to slave women and men. In a new preface, Fry reflects on the inspiration behind her original research—the desire to learn more about her enslaved great-great-grandmother, a skilled seamstress—and on the deep and often emotional chords the book has struck among readers bonded by an interest in African American artistry.
- Night Riders in Black Folk History
  - During and after the days of slavery in the United States, one way in which slave owners, overseers, and other whites sought to control the black population was to encourage and exploit a fear of the supernatural. By planting rumors of evil spirits, haunted places, body-snatchers, and "night doctors--even by masquerading as ghosts themselves--they discouraged the unauthorized movement of blacks, particularly at night, by making them afraid of meeting otherworldly beings. Blacks out after dark also risked encounters with "patterollers" (mounted surveillance patrols) or, following the Civil War, the Ku Klux Klan. Whatever their guise, all of these "night riders" had one purpose: to manipulate blacks through terror and intimidation. First published in 1975, this book explores the gruesome figure of the night rider in black folk history. Gladys-Marie Fry skillfully draws on oral history sources to show that, quite apart from its veracity, such lore became an important facet of the lived experience of blacks in America. This classic work continues to be a rich source for students and teachers of folklore, African American history, and slavery and post-emancipation studies.

Fry was married once, to Jim Knox, but later divorced him. She had no other immediate family. She died on November 7, 2015, at the age of 84 from a heart attack.

== Contributions to American quilt history ==
In 1976, Fry published landmark research about American quilt maker Harriet Powers' life in Missing Pieces: Georgia Folk Art 1770-1976, an exhibit catalog. This was the first full-scale investigation about the life and Bible-themed quilts of Powers (an African American slave, folk artist and quilt maker from rural Georgia, whose surviving works are on display at the National Museum of American History in Washington, DC, and the Museum of Fine Arts in Boston, Massachusetts).

For her book Stitched from the Soul, she mailed 600 letters to museums in the early 1980s looking for "black folk survivals". Her search identified almost 150 previously unknown slave-made quilts (identified on museum accession cards of the time as "made by unknown darkey").

Fry was one of the early researchers to document African American men quilting. She curated the 1998 exhibit Man Made: African-American Men and Quilting Traditions, which included quilts by enslaved Africans Paul Buford, Raymond Dobard, David Driskell and eleven others.

== Works ==
=== Books ===
- A miscellany of distinctive designs for all types of embroidery work in silk, wool, linen and cotton, Pittman, (1955)
- Stitched from the Soul: Slave Quilts from the Ante-Bellum South, The University of North Carolina Press; (1989) 8 editions published between 1990 and 2002
- Night Riders in Black Folk History, The University of North Carolina Press, (1975). 14 editions published between 1975 and 2001

=== Exhibit catalogs and quilt-related essays ===
- Broken Star: Post Civil War Quilts Made by Black Women, Museum of African-American Life and Culture, Dallas, Texas, 1986
- "Harriet Powers: Portrait of a Black Quilter". In Missing Pieces: Georgia Folk Art 1770-1976, pp. 16–23, 1976.
- "Made By Hand". In Mississippi Folk Arts, Mississippi State Historical Museum, 1980
- Man Made: African American Men and Quilting Traditions, Anacostia Museum and Center for African American History and Culture, Washington, DC, 1998.
- Militant Needles: An Exhibit of Slave Made Quilts, National Afro-American Museum Project, Columbus, Ohio, 1984.
- "Not by Rules, But by the Heart: The Quilts of Clementine Hunter". In Clementine Hunter, an American Folk Artist. Museum of African-American Life and Culture, Dallas, Texas, 1993.

== Organizations ==
Fry co-founded the Association of African and African-American Folklorists and was a member in good standing of the American Folklore Society.

== Awards ==
John Simon Guggenheim Memorial Foundation Fellowships to Assist Research and Artistic Creation: 1995: US & Canada Competition Humanities - Folklore & Popular Culture.
