= MSU Museum =

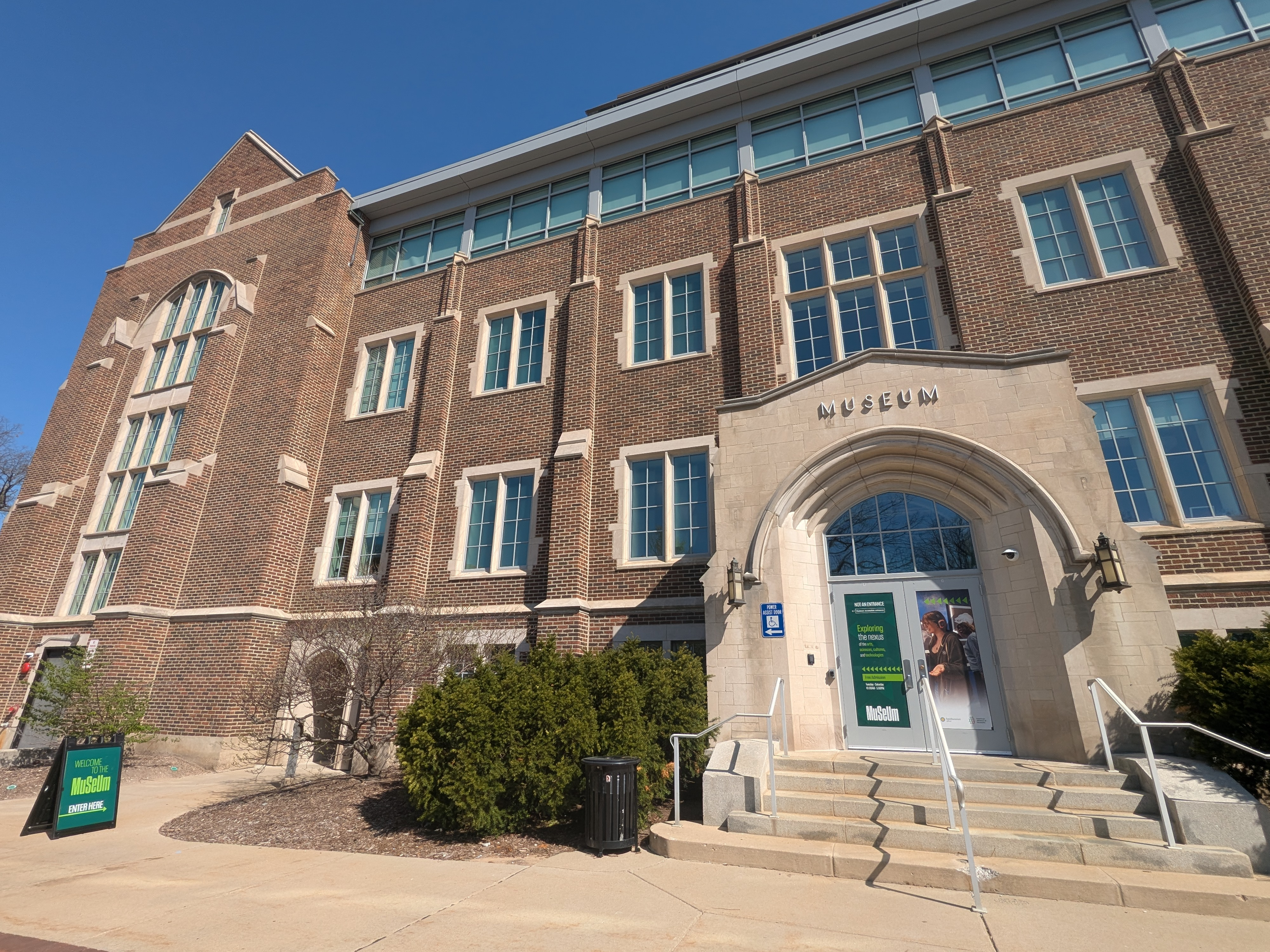
- MSU Museum, Spring 2026

- Location within Michigan Location within the United States
- Established: 1857
- Location: Michigan State University, East Lansing, MI, US
- Coordinates: 42.7315°N 84.4816°W
- Type: Interdisciplinary museum
- Accreditation: American Alliance of Museums
- Director: Devon Akmon
- Curators: Stacey Camp; Julian C. Chambliss; C. Kurt Dewhurst; Micah Ling; Marsha MacDowell; Chan Kin Onn
- Architect: Bowd–Munson Company
- Website: museum.msu.edu

The Michigan State University Museum, more commonly referred to as the MSU Museum, was formed in 1857 at Michigan State University. It is the state of Michigan's first Smithsonian Affiliate. The MSU Museum is an interdisciplinary academic museum that serves the MSU community through research, teaching, exhibitions, and public programming.

== Collections ==
The MSU Museum has over 1 million objects, artifacts, and specimens in its collection.

=== Cultural collections ===
The MSU Museum's cultural collections include anthropology, folklife, cultural heritage, and history.

=== Natural science collections ===
The MSU Museum's natural science collections include mammalogy, ornithology, herpetology, ichthyology, and vertebrate paleontology.

=== Archaeology collections ===
The MSU Museum’s archaeological collection, consisting of well over a million artifacts, emphasizes Michigan archaeology, with a geographic focus on the Lower Peninsula and the pre-contact eastern Upper Peninsula. This includes a robust assemblage from the Saginaw Basin, Traverse Corridor, and eastern Upper Peninsula of Native American artifacts, as well as historical fort site collections from Michigan’s early colonial history. Noteworthy sites from the MSU campus, such as Saint’s Rest, are also included. The archaeology collections are jointly managed and curated by the MSU Department of Anthropology and the MSU Museum.

== Exhibitions ==
The museum hosts a mixture of temporary and semi-permanent exhibitions spread over the three publicly-accessible floors of the museum.

=== Current exhibitions ===
- Blurred Realities - The Main Gallery exhibition on mis- and dis-information, and how technology is changing perceptions of authenticity.
- The Science of Salt - An exhibition highlighting MSU-based chemistry research.
- Science on a Sphere – A projection sphere of visualizations of Earth and other locations highlighting a variety of data visualizations an exhibit supported by the Michigan State University Federal Credit Union
- Digital Double - Examples of how the MSU Museum is digitizing the more than 1 million objects in its collection.
- Habitat Hall – Various dioramas of North and Central America's environments and animals, and dinosaurs skulls and skeletons.
- Second floor landing – Exploring biodiversity of things big and small. It includes a skeleton of an African bush elephant as well as an Asian elephant and a skull of a Columbian mammoth.

=== Past exhibitions ===
- Physical Spells [The Wor(l)d in the Atom] by MSUFCU Arts Power Up Artist-in-Residence Violeta Lopez Lopez
- Techno: The Rise of Detroit's Machine Music
- Monumentum by MSUFCU Arts Power Up Artist-in-Residence Abel Korinsky
- Afrofuturism & Quilts: Materializing Black Futures & Black Womxn's Quilt Legacies
- Food Fight!
- 1.5 °C – Explore the impact of climate on our planet.
- We All Live Downwind
- Gameplay – Experience games developed at MSU's Games for Entertainment and Learning (GEL Lab).
- Kindred – featured Odawa arts and crafts including ceramics, basketry, and beadwork from the Waganakising Odawa aka Little Traverse Bay Bands of Odawa Indians.

== See also ==
Eli and Edythe Broad Art Museum - another museum at Michigan State University.
