= Zachary Grey =

17th/18th-century English priest and literary critic

- Born: 6 May 1688
- Died: 1766 (aged 77–78); Ampthill, England, Great Britain
- Burial place: Houghton Conquest, England, United Kingdom
- Education: University of Cambridge (LLD)
- Children: 2 daughters

Zachary Grey (6 May 1688 – 1766) was an English priest, controversialist, and conservative spokesman for the Church of England. He was also an editor, commentator on William Shakespeare, and critic of dissenter historians.

== Life ==
Grey was the son of an Anglican priest and graduated from Trinity Hall, Cambridge, getting his LL.B. in 1709 and LL.D. in 1720. He was ordained a priest by the Bishop of London in 1711, and he left Cambridge to take up two livings: Houghton Conquest in Bedfordshire in 1725, and the parish of St Giles' and St Peter's in Cambridge. He served in Cambridge during the winter months and lived most of the year in the town of Ampthill, which put him near Houghton Conquest. Grey had a first marriage that ended quickly, and then he married Susanna Hatton, daughter of a Cambridge tavern keeper, in 1720, and the couple had two daughters to survive, and both of these married clergy.

Grey died in Ampthill in 1766 and was buried at his church in Houghton Conquest. His wife survived him for five years, and, after her death, a large portion of Grey's papers were purchased by John Nichols.

== Works ==
Grey was an extensive collector of pamphlets from the Republican side in the English Civil War, and he used this reading to combat, often with great hostility, Puritan historians and ministers. In 1720, he wrote A Vindication of the Church of England, against James Peirce, and in 1722 he wrote Presbyterian Prejudice Display'd. In reply to Jean Barbeyrac, he wrote The Spirit of Infidelity Detected, which he republished in 1735. These works were aimed primarily at rebutting the adversaries of the Established Church, as well as at vilifying Puritanism.

In 1723, Grey also began countering historians whose accounts of the Civil War praised the Republican side. He produced a volume reproducing many of the sermons of Puritan ministers during the Long Parliament in A Century of Eminent Presbyterian Preachers. This was written to target Edmund Calamy, but Grey countered John Oldmixon as well. His most consistent opponent, however, was Daniel Neal, and Grey wrote a series of pamphlets from 1723 – 1739 attacking Neal. He also countered Sir Isaac Newton's work with Examination of the 14th chapter of Sir Isaac Newton's observations upon the prophecies of Daniel. Grey showed the shallowness of Newton's biblical scholarship and accused him of Arianism. Finally, in 1744 Grey's A Review of Mr. Daniel Neal's History of the Puritans concluded the battle with Neal. For Grey, all of these historians, including Newton, were glorifying the regicides, whom Grey considered murderers, and trying to swing the public mood back to 1649. The stakes, therefore, were very high.

Grey's anti-Puritanism showed in his more literary efforts as well. In 1744, he produced an edition of Samuel Butler's Hudibras. Because of his elaborate background knowledge of the period of the Civil War, Grey's edition featured a vast array of notes and other apparatus to make the identifications in the poem explicit and to portray Butler's targets in the most unflattering light. However, this edition engendered a new quarrel. William Warburton had supplied some notes for the edition to a mutual friend, and Warburton claimed that the notes were used without explicit permission, and Warburton said that the edition was an "execrable heap of nonsense."

Grey fought back against Warburton. He issued three pamphlet replies, and in 1747 he produced Remarks upon a Late Edition of Shakespeare in response to Warburton's Shakespear. In it, he accused Warburton of sabotaging Thomas Hanmer's edition (a charge hinted at in Pope's Dunciad), and in 1750 he wrote A free and familiar letter to that great refiner of Pope and Shakespear to again attack Warburton's edition. That same year, he also wrote A Chronological and Historical Account of the most Remarkable Earthquakes, which he expanded two years later, with a theme of the transience of life and the need for devotion. Grey produced his own edition of Shakespeare in 1754, in the two volume Critical, Historical, and Explanatory Notes on Shakespeare. Grey's position on Shakespeare was in line with that of Lewis Theobald and Thomas Hamner, and his goal in the Notes was to show how Shakespeare used his historical sources faithfully.
