= William Farish (chemist) =

British chemist

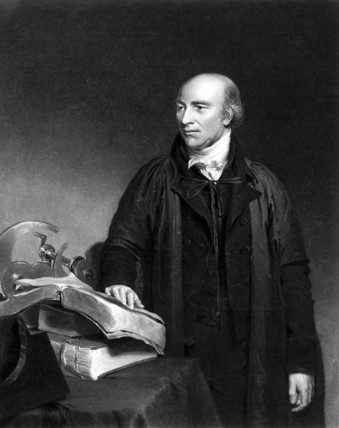
Portrait of William Farish, 1815.

William Farish (1759–1837) was a British scientist who was a professor of Chemistry and Natural Philosophy at the University of Cambridge, known for the development of the method of isometric projection and development of the first written university examination.

== Biography ==
Farish was probably born around mid-April, as he was baptized on 21 April 1759. Farish's father was the Reverend James Farish (1714–1783), vicar of Stanwix near Carlisle. His mother was Elizabeth Gilpin sister of the clergyman William Gilpin. Farish himself was educated at Carlisle Grammar School, entered Magdalene College, Cambridge, as a sizar in 1774, and graduated Senior Wrangler and first in Smith's Prize in 1778. As tutor in 1792, Farish developed the concept of grading students' work quantitatively.

He was Professor of Chemistry at Cambridge from 1794 to 1813, lecturing on chemistry's practical application. Farish's lectures as professor of chemistry, which were oriented towards natural philosophy while the professor of natural and experimental philosophy F. J. H. Wollaston (1762–1828) gave very chemically oriented lectures. From 1813 to 1837 Farish was Jacksonian Professor of Natural Philosophy. In 1819 Professor Farish became the first president of the Cambridge Philosophical Society.

Farish was also Vicar of St Giles' and St Peter from 1800 to 1837. He extensively remodelled St Giles' Church, Cambridge, increasing the accommodation from 100 to 600 seats.

== Work ==
At Cambridge University, according to Hilkens (1967), Farish was "the first man to teach the construction of machines as a subject in its own right instead of merely using mechanisms as examples to illustrate the principles of theoretical physics or applied mathematics." He further became "famous for his work in applying chemistry and mechanical science to arts and manufactures".

=== Isometric projection ===
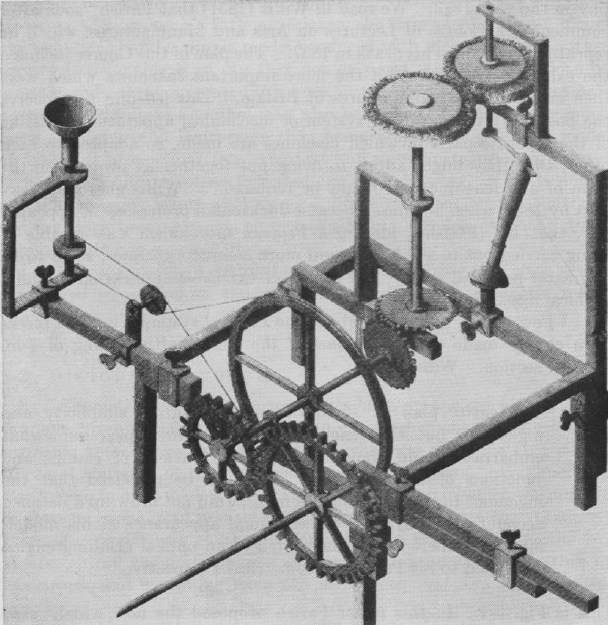
Optimal-grinding engine model (1822), drawn in 30° isometric.

In his lectures on the mechanical principles of machinery used in manufacturing industries, Farish often used models to illustrated particular principles. This models were often especially assembled for these lectures and disassembled for storage afterwards. In order to explain how these models were to be assembled he had developed a drawing technique, which he called "Isometrical Perspective".

Although the concept of an isometric had existed in a rough way for centuries, William Farish is generally regarded as the first to provide rules for isometric drawing. In the 1822 paper "On Isometrical Perspective" Farish recognized the "need for accurate technical working drawings free of optical distortion. This would lead him to formulate isometry. Isometry means "equal measures" because the same scale is used for height, width, and depth".

From the middle of the 19th century, according to Jan Krikke (2006) isometry became an "invaluable tool for engineers, and soon thereafter axonometry and isometry were incorporated in the curriculum of architectural training courses in Europe and the U.S. The popular acceptance of axonometry came in the 1920s, when modernist architects from the Bauhaus and De Stijl embraced it". De Stijl architects like Theo van Doesburg used "axonometry for their architectural designs, which caused a sensation when exhibited in Paris in 1923".

== Works ==
- 1796. A plan of a course of lectures on arts and manufactures : more particularly such as relate to chemistry.
- 1822. "On Isometrical Perspective". In: Transactions of the Cambridge Philosophical Society, 1
- 1849. Professor Farish on Isometrical Drawing. J.P. Pirsson.

Academic offices
Preceded by Isaac Pennington	Professor of Chemistry (1702); 1794–1813	Succeeded by Smithson Tennant
Preceded by Francis Wollaston	Jacksonian Professor of Natural Philosophy; 1813–1837	Succeeded by Robert Willis
