= Yusuf Hamied 1702 Professor of Chemistry =

The Yusuf Hamied 1702 Chair of Chemistry is one of the senior professorships at the University of Cambridge, based in the Yusuf Hamied Department of Chemistry.

== History ==
Founded in 1702 by the university as simply 'Professor of Chemistry', it was retitled as the Professorship of Organic Chemistry in 1943, and in 1991 was renamed after a benefaction from the oil company British Petroleum. In recognition of a donation from Yusuf Hamied, in 2018 the professorship was renamed the Yusuf Hamied 1702 Chair of Chemistry.

=== Professors of Chemistry ===
- Giovanni Francisco Vigani (1703–1713)
- John Waller (1713–1718)
- John Mickleburgh (1718–1756)
- John Hadley (1756–1764)
- Richard Watson (1764–1771)
- Isaac Pennington (1773–1793)
- William Farish (1794–1813)
- Smithson Tennant (1813–1815)
- James Cumming (1815–1861)
- George Downing Liveing (1861–1908)
- William Jackson Pope (1908–1939)

=== Professors of Organic Chemistry ===
- Alexander Robertus Todd (1944–1971)
- Ralph Alexander Raphael (1972–1988)
- Alan Rushton Battersby (1988–1992)

=== BP 1702 Professor of Organic Chemistry ===
- Steven V. Ley (1992–2019)

=== Yusuf Hamied 1702 Professors of Chemistry ===
- Matthew J. Gaunt (2019–)
