= Pieter Hellendaal =

Dutch composer, organist and violinist (1721–1799)

Pieter Hellendaal (1 April 1721 – 19 April 1799) was a Dutch composer, organist and violinist.

At the age of 30, he migrated to England where he lived for the last 48 of his 78 years, and where he was known as Peter Hellendaal. He was one of the most notable 18th-century composers of Dutch origin. His son, also Peter Hellendaal (sometimes known as Peter Hellendaal the younger) was also a professional musician.

== Life ==
=== Early and student years ===
Hellendaal was born in Rotterdam on 1 April 1721, the son of Neeltje Lacroix and Johannes Hellendaal. Johannes earned a living to support his family as a candle-maker while seeking paid gigs, and teaching and working with amateur musicians. As a father, Johannes provided his son Pieter with an intense musical education, including organ and violin. In addition to his highly creative compositions and prodigious craft as a performer, Pieter in maturity maintained himself by compositions and self-publications that respected and supported amateur musicians.

In 1731, the Hellendaal family moved to Utrecht where Pieter – still juvenile – became organist for the St. Nicholas church, a highly visible and prestigious position: Popularly known as the "Santa Claus" Church, St. Nicholas was the second oldest parish church in the Netherlands and had been recognized for many centuries as a leader for organ music. In 1120 it was already well known as the first Dutch church to use a portable organ. The main organ in the 1730s had been built by Peter Gerritsz during the years 1477 to 1479, and is the first large Dutch organ and was famous as one of the first and best preserved anywhere from the Middle Ages. Under Johannes' supervision, son Pieter at age ten played the Peter Gerritsz organ. From January 1732 (when Pieter was about twelve) until 1737 he was appointed an organist. In that year, when Pieter was 15, the Hellendaal family moved, this time to Amsterdam.

Soon after their arrival, Pieter's outstanding talent as a violinist came to the attention of the Amsterdam city Secretary, Mattheus Lestevenon, who arranged for him (barely sixteen) to study in Italy where he stayed for six years (1737–1743). For two years of this journey (1740–1742) he studied in Padua at the Scuola delle nazioni with Giuseppe Tartini, the most famous violinist of that time.

After returning to Amsterdam in 1742, and much as his father had in his earlier years, Pieter sought an audience wherever he could, and sought paying gigs whenever possible, such as playing in the hostels of the city. Finally, two years later in 1744, he stempted to settle down by two actions that set much of the tone for the rest of his life. First, he married the daughter of a well-off Amsterdam city surgeon and started a family. Second, he obtained an official permit to start his own publishing house. Soon after permitted, he published his first two works: two sets of sonatas for violin and basso continuo. Self-publishing his own works, including widening his market with extra directions to support performance by amateur musicians, became a hallmark of his life until his death.

To support his family despite not having found an established musical job, Hellendaal free-lanced, seeking gigs in The Hague and Leiden. In The Hague, the capital of the Dutch Republic, he performed regularly in the noble court of the Governor, or "Stadtholder", sometime translated as Lieutenant, an office which eventually became the Monarch. There he played for Prince William IV, and especially for the Prince's English wife, Anne of Hanover, whose enthusiasm made her known as "the musical princess". Perhaps Anne put in his mind to better his finances by moving to England where much of society was similarly enthusiastic about music, and thus there were for better prospects for a better money as a musician.

In Leiden, Hellendaal played the organ regularly in the Mare church, named for its location on Mare Street, a central arterial in downtown, and formerly a canal which had been paved over. Like the St Nicholas church in Utrecht, it was well known as one of the first Protestant churches in Netherlands. Hellendaal did find a stream of paid gigs, playing for and with music enthusiasts and amateurs around the University of Leiden. For two years, 1749 until 1751, he continued his musical studies at that university.

=== England ===
In 1752, at the age of thirty, Hellendaal gave up the sporadic pay of the free-lance life, and moved his family to England where great numbers of the newly prosperous middle-class—as well as the nobility—were music enthusiasts as well as amateur players, and much work was available as a teacher and performer for musicians of notable ability.

In London, Hellendaal soon established himself as a prominent composer and violin soloist. London newspapers during his eight years there gave conspicuous notice to his frequent performances at such then-prestigious venues as Hickford's Rooms on Brewer Street, and the many other venues set up by entrepreneurs to serve the interests of the widespread musical enthusiasm of English society. His prominence gained the attention and the acquaintance of George Frideric Handel, who on 13 February 1754 helped Hellendaal be paid for violin solos between the acts of Acis and Galatea (HWV49a/b).

Unable to secure a steady job as a musician in London, Hellendaal made his living by working as the organist for St. Margaret's Church in King's Lynn, located in Norfolk—a port town about 97 miles north of London—from 1760 to 1762 . This was stable job, but not yet sufficient to sustain his family, nor convenient, due to the distance from London.

=== Cambridge University ===
At the age of forty, in 1762, Hellendaal moved to Cambridge, where the musical enthusiasm in academic circles around the University allowed him to settle down for the rest of his life. First, he was hired as an organist for Pembroke College, Cambridge, and was able to teach, give concerts, and compose. Fifteen years later, in 1777, he was appointed organist in the Chapel of Peterhouse where he worked until he died 37 years later in 1799, at the age of 78. He is buried in the church yard of the next door church, Little St Mary's.

=== Peter Hellendaal, a.k.a. 'The Younger' ===
Born circa 1756 in London and given his father's name, the son is known as Pieter Hellendaal (the Younger), or simply in the name's English form, Peter.

Peter became a violinist, clarinetist, and arranger/composer. He actively collaborated in his father's self-publishing during the 1790s, helping send to market a stream of various musical publications. For example, to serve the needs of parish churches, he selected and arranged for publication pieces from the Elder's Collection of Psalms and Hymns. This publication also included one of Peter's own compositions.

The last notice of Peter's life was from 17 April 1801 when he was the soloist in a benefit concert which performed a concerto written by his father. He died later that year, at the age of 45, outliving his father by only two years.

== Works ==
His works include virtuoso violin sonatas in the Italian late Baroque style; Three Grand Lessons for keyboard, violin, and continuo (published ca. 1790); a cantata, and vocal works (including canons, catches, and glees).

His Six Concerti Grossi (published c. 1758, Op. 3, in eight parts) retained the older style – where several different soloists interact with a somewhat larger group of players who provide the larger orchestral texture. This genre retained its popularity in England for decades after it became unfashionable on the Continent.

=== Instrumental ===
- Six Sonatas for Violin and Basso continuo, Op. 1 (Amsterdam, circa 1745)
- Six Sonatas for Violin and Basso continuo, Op. 2 (Amsterdam, c.1750)
- Six Concerti Grossi in Eight Parts, Op. 3 (London, c.1758) – Huntington: King's Music, 1991 reproduction by the publisher.
  - Concerto No. 1 in G minor (Movements: 1 Ouverture; 2 Largo; 3 Presto; 4 Minuet)
  - Concerto No. 2 in D minor (Movements: 1 Ouverture; 2 Allegro; 3 Affettuoso; 4 Presto; 5 Borea)
  - Concerto No. 3 in F major (Movements: 1 Largo; 2 Allegro; 3 Adagio; 4 Alla breve; 5 March)
  - Concerto No. 4 in E-flat major (Movements: 1 Grave sostenuto; 2 Alla breve; 3 Affettuoso; 4 Presto; 5 Pastorale)
  - Concerto No. 5 in D major (Movements: 1 Largo; 2 Allegro; 3 Larghetto; 4 Allegro; 5 March)
  - Concerto No. 6 in F major (Movements: 1 Largo; 2 Allegro; 3 Adagio; 4 Allegro; 5 Menuet)
- Six Solos for Violin and Basso continuo, Op. 4 (London, c. 1760)
- Eight Sonatas for Cello and Basso continuo, Op. 5 (Cambridge, 1780)
  - Sonata No. 1 in G major
  - Sonata No. 2 in D major
  - Sonata No. 3 in D minor
  - Sonata No. 4 in D major
  - Sonata No. 5 in G major
  - Sonata No. 6 in D major
  - Sonata No. 7 in C major
  - Sonata No. 8 in G major
- Three Grand Lessons for harpsichord or fortepiano, Violin, and Cello, Op. 6 (London, c. 1789)
- Hellendaal's Celebrated Rondo for Viola and Basso continuo (Cambridge, c. 1790)
- Eleven Sonatas for Violin and Basso continuo, (manuscript, Fitzwilliam Museum Cambridge)
- Minor variants of a few sonatas from Opp. 1 and 2

==== Lost works ====
- Twelve 'Solos' for Viola and Basso continuo (c. 1778)
- Six Sonatas for Harpsichord and Viola or Flute (c. 1791)
- Harpsichord Concerto
- Viola Concerto
- Clarinet Overture
- Clarinet Trio

=== Vocal works ===
- Glory be to the Father (Canon, Five-part: 1769)
- The Cock Match (Catch, Four-part: 1769)
- Love inform thy faithful creature (Glee, Four-part: c. 1775)
- Strepton and Myrtilla Violin solo, Viola or Flute, and Basso continuo (Cantata: c. 1785)
- A collection of psalms and hymns (Cambridge, c. 1790)
- A Collection of Psalms and Hymns for the use of parish churches selected and arranged by Pieter Hellendaal the Younger: Three- or Four Parts with Basso continuo (Cambridge, 1793)
- Tweedledum and Tweedledee (Glee, Four-parts with Basso continuo (Cambridge, c. 1790)
- 'Two Glees' (Four-parts with Strings and Basso continuo (Cambridge, c. 1791)
  - Spirit, once wand'ring thro' this dreary vale
  - Music has charms to sooth a savage breast

==== Lost works ====
- Our Lord's Sermon on the Mount (c. 1797)

=== Recordings ===
- Pieter Hellendaal: 6 Concerti Grossi – European Community Baroque Orchestra conducted by Roy Goodman. Channel Classics Records Nl CD CCS 3492
- Pieter Hellendaal: "Rondo in D major", track 6 in English 18th-Century Violin Sonatas (English Orpheus, Vol. 13) Hyperion CD (Catalog No. CDA66583); Elizabeth Wallfisch on violin with the Locatelli Trio.
