= Hudibras =

Poem written by Samuel Butler

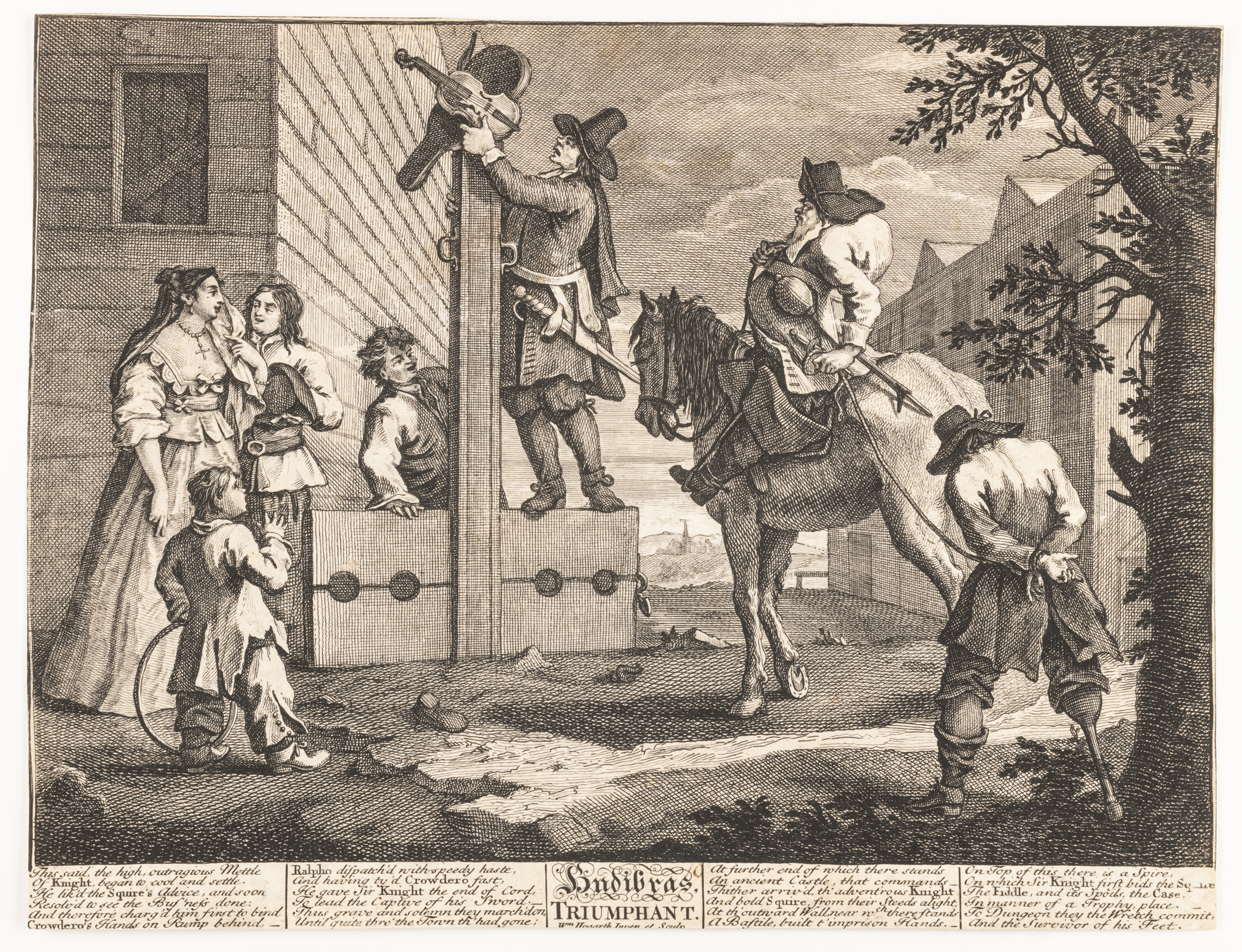
One of twelve engravings illustrating the adventures of Hudibras by William Hogarth.

Hudibras (/ˈhjuːdɪbræs/) is a vigorous satirical poem, written in a mock-heroic style by Samuel Butler (1613–1680), and published in three parts in 1663, 1664 and 1678. The action is set in the last years of the Interregnum, around 1658–60, immediately before the restoration of Charles II as king in May 1660.

The story shows Hudibras, a Cromwellian knight and colonel in the New Model Army, being regularly defeated and humiliated, as in Miguel de Cervantes' Don Quixote, Butler's main inspiration. Colonel Hudibras' humiliations arrive sometimes by the skills and courage of women, and the epic ends with a witty and detailed declaration by the latest female to get the better of him that women are intellectually superior to men.

Hudibras is notable for its longevity: from the 1660s, it was more or less always in print, from many different publishers and editors, till the period of the First World War (see below). Apart from Lord Byron's masterpiece Don Juan (1819–24), there are few English verse satires of this length (over 11,000 lines) that have had such a long and influential life in print.

The satire "delighted the royalists but was less an attack on the puritans than a criticism of antiquated thinking and contemporary morals, and a parody of old-fashioned literary form."

Or, as one of the poem's editors has written: "Hudibras, like Gulliver's Travels, is an unique imaginative work, capable of shocking, enlivening, provoking, and entertaining the reader in a peculiar and distinctive way, vigorously witty and powerful in its invective. It is the ebullient inventiveness of Hudibras which is likely to commend it to the modern reader and which raises it above its historical context. Justice still remains to be done not to Butler the moralist but to Butler the poet."

While the original proverb appears in King James Version of the Bible, Book of Proverbs, 13:24, this poem is the first appearance of the quotation and popularised the aphorism "spare the rod and spoil the child".

All Hudibras quotations and references below, unless otherwise marked, relate to the standard modern edition (Oxford, 1967), edited by John Wilders.

== Overview ==
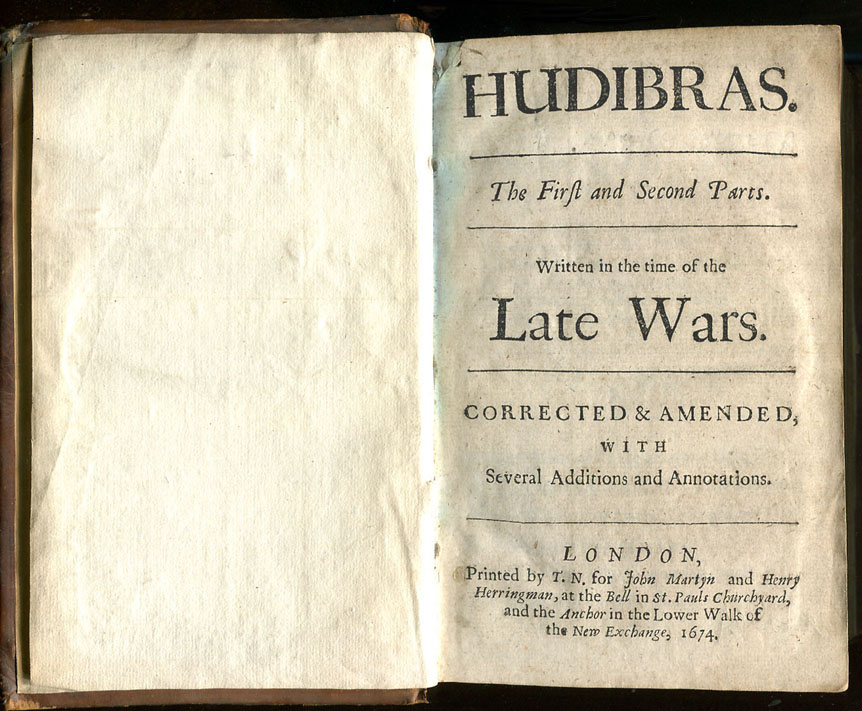
First Collected edition of Hudibras by Samuel Butler, 1674–1678

Hudibras is a Presbyterian colonel. His squire, Ralpho, is one of the Independents, who follow a more radical version of puritanism, one far less formal and structured than Presbyterianism. However, Butler's satire is not focused on details of their belief or theology. They regularly fall into heated argument with each other, but these arguments are never about faith or doctrine; they are always focused on the rules of argument and the definitions of words. It is noticeable that not once, in over 11,000 lines of satiric verse, does either of them laugh or smile.

Hudibras and Ralpho set out, much like Don Quixote and Sancho Panza, to combat those whom they consider to be their enemies. Throughout their adventures and humiliations, the third key person of the story, the rich widow whose money Hudibras would dearly like to get his hands on, plays an increasingly important role, and the conclusion of Part III is a lengthy, detailed, and unqualified declaration by the rich widow that men, on the basis of the entire preceding story, are clearly inferior to women. This declaration is notable, in a large-scale popular satire written by an English male author in the seventeenth century, and reminds the reader that Hudibras's most crushing defeats were at the hands of Trulla, the village prostitute (I:iii:757–928, pp. 82–87), and the rich widow herself in the last 382 lines of the last book headed "The Ladies Answer to the Knight" (pp. 310–321).

Throughout the satire, Butler seems to write from a position of broad-based ironic scepticism. Unlike many anti-Puritan writers of the Restoration period, Butler says nothing in Hudibras to suggest that he himself welcomed either the return of the Church of England or the restoration of the monarchy. In his Commonplace book, recorded by his old friend William Longueville (1639–1721), Butler has a section on "Princes" (fols 70r–72v), where he shows a witty contempt of, amongst others, Charles II of England and his family: "No man can oblige a Prince more then hee that kills his father", and "CR [Charles Rex] came to the Throne by the Right of two Women [Mary Tudor and Mary Queen of Scots] and therfore has the more Reason to be Kind to Them", and "One Brother ruind another by forcing Him to marry a Whore and was after ruind himself by whores". (It was widely said at the time that Charles II had forced his brother, later James II of England, to marry Anne Hyde.)

== The characters ==
=== Hudibras ===
In Part One Canto One we have elaborately sardonic descriptions of Hudibras and Ralpho. "Never did trusty Squire with Knight, Or Knight with squier jump more right" (I:i:619f; p. 19). Hudibras is described as a "Mirrour of Knighthood" (I:i:16; p. 1), though we soon find that he even has difficulty mounting, and staying on, his horse. As Butler describes key points of Hudibras's very formal university learning—logic, rhetoric, geometry, algebra, arithmetic and theology—he mocks the trivial and purely verbal uses that Hudibras makes of these:

He was in Logick a great Critick,
Profoundly skill'd in Analytick.
He could distinguish, and divide
A hair 'twixt South and South-west side:
On either which he would dispute,
Confute, change hands, and still confute. [...]
All this by Syllogism, true
In mood and figure, he would doe. [...]
For Rhetorick, he could not ope
His mouth, but out there flew a Trope
[... He spoke] a Babylonish dialect
Which learned Pedants much affect:
'Twas English cut on Greek and Latin... (I:i:65–97; pp. 3f)

[...] he by Geometrick scale
Could take the size of Pots of Ale [... ]
And wisely tell what hour o'th' day
The Clock does strike, by Algebra. (I:i:119–126; pp. 4f)

=== Ralpho ===
For Hudibras's squire Ralpho, on the other hand, who is a tailor, these formal academic skills are insignificant, or downright distractions. He guides his life not by philosophical systems but by direct personal inspiration: "Some call it Gifts, and some New light; A liberal Art, that costs no pains Of Study, Industry or Brains." (I:i:476–478; p. 25)

He could deep Mysteries unriddle,
As easily as thread a Needle; [...]
Whate're men speak by this new Light,
Still they are sure to be i' th' right.
'Tis a dark-Lanthorn of the Spirit,
Which none see by but those who bear it: [...]
An Ignis Fatuus, that bewitches,
And leads men into Pools and Ditches,
To make them dip themselves, and sound [i.e. "dive"]
For Christendome in Dirty pond; [...]
Thus Ralph became infallible... (I:i:493–506, 519; pp. 15f)

Ralpho and Hudibras frequently challenge each other in long arguments, mostly about the "true" meanings of words. Ralpho, for example, argues that in reality a Presbyterian synod-meeting is the same thing as a bear-baiting: "...put them in a bag, and shake 'em Yourself o' th' sudden would mistake 'em, And not know which is which..." (I:i:833–835; p. 25f), while Hudibras uses elaborate academic terminology to try to prove logically that synod-meetings and bear-baitings are not the same thing.

=== The rich widow ===
The rich widow is unnamed throughout. Hudibras schemes to get her money, whether by marrying her or by legal trickery. She enjoys leading him on to make a fool of himself, and at the end of Part Three she is clearly the winner.

=== The townspeople ===
Throughout Parts One and Two, the townspeople are elaborately presented as heroes in the grand literary mode. Under their heroic descriptions (Part One Canto Two) they are in fact Crowdero, a fiddler with a wooden leg; Orsin the bear-warden and his Bear, Bruin; Trulla the prostitute; Cerdon the shoemaker; Talgol the butcher; Magnano, a tinker; and Colon, a farmer.

=== Sidrophel and Whackum ===
Sidrophel, the local Rosicrucian conjurer and astrologer, first appears at the end of Part Two, with his assistant (his "zany"), Whackum. Butler tells the reader in a footnote that Whackum is modelled on the "notorious Ideot" who wrote the spurious "Part Two" (1663; see below) in "abominable Doggerel", before Butler published the genuine Part Two towards the end of that year.

== Plot ==
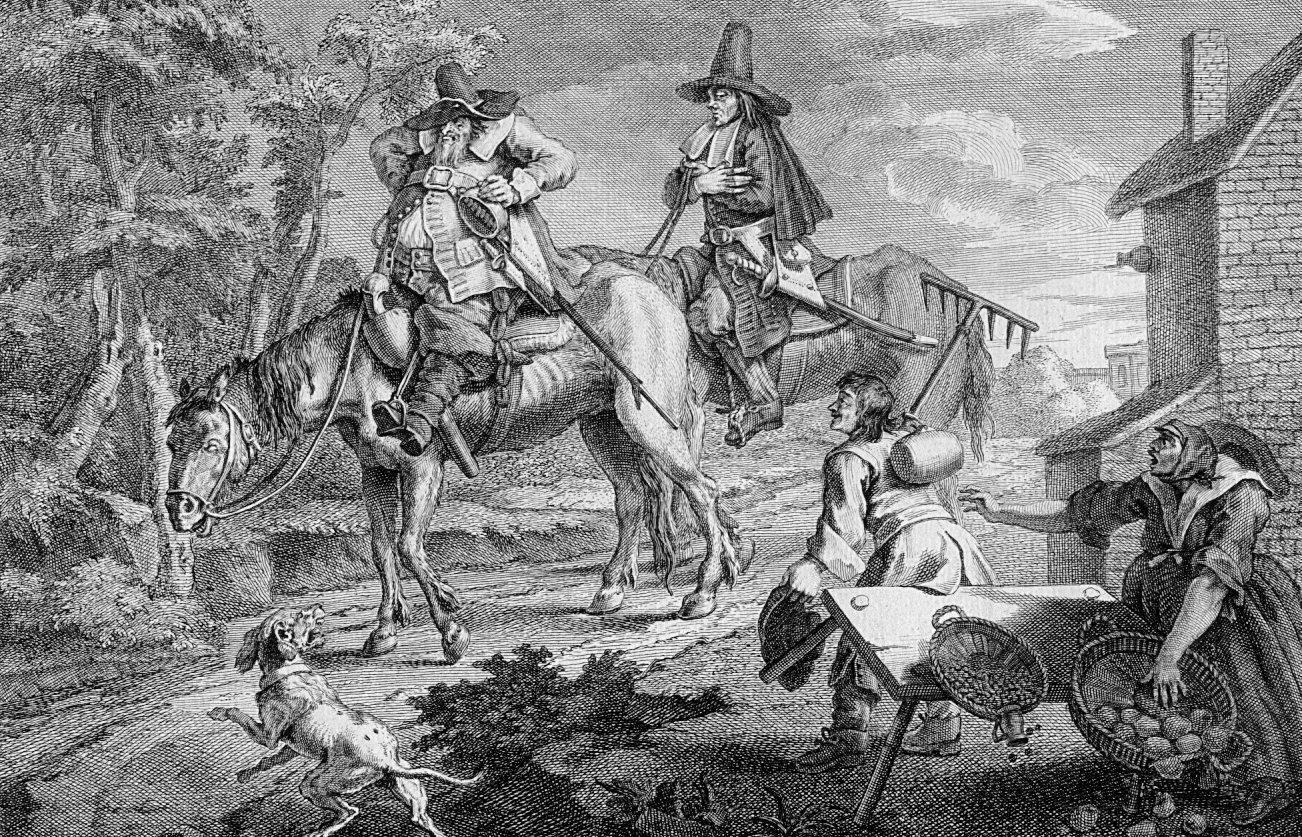
Hudibras Sallies Forth by William Hogarth

In The First Part (1663) Hudibras and Ralpho set out, seeking knightly adventure, and encounter a local bear-baiting which they agree that they have to prevent, though they disagree about exactly why. They first defeat, and are then defeated by, the townspeople, and in particular by Trulla, the characterful local prostitute, who gains the victory by pushing Hudibras, the "Mirrour of Knighthood", off his horse, beating him with a rain of blows, then climbing up and standing on him. Hudibras owns her the victor, and strips off and surrenders his armour and weapons. She mockingly puts her dress onto Hudibras, then locks him and Ralpho in the village stocks. They are finally released by a rich widow, who bails them out on condition that once he is free Hudibras will give himself the flogging he deserves.

The Second Part (1664) begins with them debating whether it is permissible for Hudibras to break his oath to the widow, to not give himself a flogging, and then to lie to her. The discussion is interrupted by the approach of a riotous and noisy skimmington or charivari, which Hudibras mistakes for some paganism. The skimmington procession pelts Hudibras and Ralpho with rotten eggs and attacks their horses; they make their escape, and go to find a pond to get clean in. After a further discussion Ralpho persuades Hudibras to consult the local conjurer, Sidrophel, but Sidrophel and Hudibras argue angrily and at length about what arts are lawful and what arts are unlawful. Exasperated, Sidrophel taunts Hudibras with having been earlier humiliated at Kingston and Brentford Fairs, and claims that it was his own assistant Whackum who stole Hudibras's cloak and picked his pocket. Hudibras points out that Sidrophel is drawing that story from the spurious "Part Two", but nevertheless he sends Ralpho out to fetch a constable to charge Sidrophel with the possession of stolen property. Hudibras knocks Whackum and Sidrophel down and picks their pockets. Believing that they are both dead, Hudibras decides that since Ralpho is disrespectful towards Hudibras's orthodox puritanism, he will leave Ralpho to come back with the constable, find the two bodies, and carry the can for the two deaths.

The Third and Last Part (1678) begins with a satiric letter from Hudibras to Sidrophel, satirising the activities of the recently formed Royal Society. The story then moves on: after the fight with Sidrophel and Whackum, Hudibras, and Ralpho are now estranged, and Hudibras, determined to get his hands on the widow's wealth, goes to her and lies about how he flogged himself, and then defeated Sidrophel and Whackum. Ralpho, however, was ahead of him, and has already told the widow the truth. She traps Hudibras into a long argument about the true nature of marriage (she pointedly maintains that men get married principally because they are after a woman's money), which takes them till after sunset. This argument is interrupted by a loud knocking on the door. Terrified that it might be Sidrophel, Hudibras hides under a table in a nearby room, in the dark, only to find that he is being pulled out and trampled by what appears in the dark to be a group of demons; one cloven-hoofed demon, standing on him just as Trulla had done in Part One, makes him admit his intention to defraud the rich widow of her money; also to confess his lie about having scourged himself, and to confess his dishonesty and mercenariness, and more. Colonel Hudibras shows himself up as a dishonest, cowardly, and superstitious fool. The demons then leave him, still in darkness, but there is, somewhere in the dark room, one remaining "blackguard sprite" who upbraids him in detail with all his deceits and cowardice. Hudibras finds him uncomfortably well-informed about his doings. As dawn approaches, Hudibras and the "blackguard sprite" escape from the Widow's house, find Hudibras's and Ralpho's horses, and flee. Canto Two is a satiric disquisition on the turbulent state of puritan and national party politics in 1659–60. In Canto Three, as daylight breaks, Hudibras discovers that the "blackguard sprite" who upbraided him in the darkness was in fact Ralpho, who tells him that the cloven-hoofed demon who stood on him and questioned him was a local weaver in a parson's gown, and that the widow heard every word, and laughed.

Ralpho goes on to persuade him not to pursue the rich widow directly, but to go to law against her for a breach of contract to marry, and get hold of her money that way. Hudibras consults a pettifogging lawyer in London, who advises him how to begin by writing the widow a letter that will entrap her into making statements on paper that Hudibras can use to pursue a breach of promise suit against her.

The widow reads Hudibras's letter, smiles, and writes him a reply that avoids his trap, while spelling out in riotously contemptuous detail how right women are to despise men. Her last words, the very last words of Butler's Third and Last Part, are a strongly-worded statement that men are inferior to women: she ends her letter, and the entire satire, with a clear statement that she has no intention to "Let men usurp Th'unjust Dominion, / As if they were the Better Women." (III:"The Ladies Answer to the Knight", lines 381–382; p. 321)

== The style ==
Butler's style includes many colloquial and literary resources of seventeenth-century English literature.

Hudibras [...]
[...] with as delicate a Hand
Could twist as tough a Rope of Sand
And weave fine Cobwebs, fit for skull
That's empty when the Moon is full;
Such as take lodgings in a Head
That's to be let unfurnished. (I:i:155–160; p.6)

He often echoes the complex, sometimes surreal, fantasies of the earlier Metaphysical poets such as Donne and Crashaw:

[Love]'s but an Ague that's reverst,
Whose hot fit takes the Patient first,
That after burns with cold as much,
As Ir'n in Greenland, does the touch,
Melts in the Furnace of desire,
Like Glass, that's but the Ice of Fire,
And when his heat of Fancy's over
Becomes as hard, and frail a Lover [and so on!] (III:i:653 ff; p. 209)

and...

Those Spider Saints, that hang by Threads
Spun out of th'Entrails of their Heads. (III.i.1461f; p. 230)

Butler's imagination always tends to explore the wider possibilities of each thought.

So, the Emperour Caligula,
That triumph'd o're the British Sea;
Took Crabs, and Oysters Prisoners,
And Lobsters, 'stead of Curasiers,
Ingag'd his Legions in fierce bustles,
With Perywinkles, Prawns and Muscles:
And led his Troops with furious gallops,
To charge whole Regiments of Scallops.
Not like their ancient way of War,
To wait on his triumphal Carr;
But when he went to dine or sup,
More bravely eat his Captives up;
And left all Wars by his example,
Reduc'd to vict'ling of a Camp well. (III:iii:359–372; pp. 288f; cf Suetonius, Caligula xlvi)

Butler relishes extremely long-developed images and arguments (too long to quote); an example is the start of Part One Canto Three where the reader encounters an epic battle, described in grand style in 145 lines, between a solitary hero and a crowd of his enemies. Two other heroes come to his aid, and take him to where he can recover from his wounds. The episode is described at heroic length, and the grandeur of the language both conceals and highlights the comic reality: the hero is a performing bear, his attackers are stray dogs, and his rescuers are a prostitute and a shoemaker. (I:iii:25–170; pp. 63–67)

== Hudibras's name ==
Butler probably found the name "Hudibras" in Book Two of Spenser's Faerie Queene (1590), where "Huddibras" (so spelt by Spenser throughout) is a knight who was more famous for his strength than for his deeds, and who was more foolhardy than wise. Spenser himself picked up the name either from Holinshed's Chronicles or from Holinshed's source, Geoffrey of Monmouth's historical fantasy De gestis Britonum or History of the Kings of Britain (ca 1136; first printed in 1508). Unlike Butler and Spenser, neither Geoffrey nor Holinshed gives Hudibras any particular characteristics or activities.

== The first appearances of Hudibras in print ==
Butler seems to have started writing the satire in the late 1650s. He finished Part One in 1662, and it was licensed for printing by the government licenser, Sir John Berkenhead, on 11 November 1662. As often happened in that period towards the end of each year, the title-page bears the date 1663 but the bookseller had already begun selling it late in 1662. The book had such immediate popularity that even before the end of December 1662 at least one pirated edition had appeared, which led the licenser to put a notice in the official government newsletter (Mercurius Publicus) published on 1 January 1663, denouncing the unlicensed publication.

This edition of Mercurius Publicus, published in January 1663, was in fact dated 1662: government documents, both published and unpublished, stuck to the Old Style calendar, in which the year number changed not on 1 January, but on 25 March three months later. (Government documents only changed to New Style dates from 1 January 1753; see Old Style and New Style dates.) However, for printers and booksellers, and the general public, in Butler's day the year started, and the number changed, on 1 January. Some editors and commentators have from time to time been confused by the "official" dating of the Mercurius Publicus "Advertisement" and have wrongly thought the first edition was in fact published in 1662.

An enterprising scribbler (unknown) also faked and published a so-called "Part Two". (In Butler's own Second Part, later that year, he teased his readers about this fake "Part Two" by making it one of Sidrophel's lies (II:3:991ff; pp. 180ff).) By the end of 1663 Hudibras had become so popular that there had been five official, licensed, editions of Part One, and four unlicensed pirated editions.

Butler's Part Two was published just one year after Part One, with the date 1664; as usual, it was available in the shops some weeks before the end of 1663. Pepys bought a copy on 10 December 1663. He called it "the book now in greatest Fashion for drollery, though I cannot, I confess, see enough where the wit lies." (Diary, 10 December 1663.)

Parts One and Two "with several additions and annotations" were published together in 1674. "There is every sign that [this] was revised by the poet." (Wilders ed., p. lvi)

Part Three, which Butler headed The Third and Last Part, was dated 1678, two years before Butler's death, but was, again, available at the end of the preceding year.

== The long afterlife of Hudibras ==
The history of Hudibras between 1678 and 1967 is a long history of continuing public popularity, interwoven with textual and editorial confusion. Wilders establishes that it is clear from the text that the 1674 edition of the first two Parts and the 1678 edition of Part Three established Butler's own final and authorised text of all three Parts (Wilders ed. cit, lvii–lviii). However, almost all eighteenth- and nineteenth-century editors produced composite texts, blurring Butler's final intentions with passages that Butler himself had deleted or changed.

The poem was understandably highly popular among adherents of Jacobitism and Donald Cameron of Lochiel, Chief of Clan Cameron and one of the main leaders of the Jacobite rising of 1745, owned a copy of Hudibras in his library at Achnacarry Castle in Lochaber. The same volume, which was on long-term loan to Lochiel's younger brother Alexander Cameron during the latter's wanderings in the British West Indies and Catholic Europe, is known to have played a role in Alexander's conversion from the non-juring Scottish Episcopal Church to Roman Catholicism and subsequent decision to pursue a life in the priesthood. In the extant 1730 letter and memorandum announcing and explaining his conversion to his elder brother, Alexander Cameron quoted a particularly important passage to his own religious development from Hudibras directly:

"Call fire and sword and desolation,
A godly thorough Reformation,
Which allways must be carried on,
And still be doing, never done,
As if religion were intended
For nothing else but to be mended."

=== Early translation into French ===
James Townley (playwright and clergyman, 1714–1778) translated Hudibras into French, and published this in Paris in 1757. Henry Hart Milman (1791–1868), Dean of St Paul's Cathedral and editor of Edward Gibbon, remarked, "Two modern writers of imagination, Mr. Beckford and the late Mr. Hope, originally wrote, the one Vathek, the other Anastasius, in French; but perhaps the most extraordinary effort of composition in a foreign language by an Englishman is the translation of Hudibras by Mr. Townley." This may be the first translation of Hudibras into a foreign language.

=== Editions and versions in England after Butler's death ===
Hudibras seems to have been regularly in demand in the bookshops for over 150 years. New editions came out dated 1704 and 1712, and another in 1726 that had illustrations by William Hogarth. In 1744 appeared another new edition, as usual using the editor's own composite text: this editor was Zachary Grey (1688–1766), a passionately anti-puritan Church of England clergyman. Grey added extensive and rambling notes, many of them quite irrelevant, in which he determinedly tried to position Hudibras as solidly supporting the Church of England. (Nothing in the text seems to support this.) William Warburton, the friend of Alexander Pope, editor of Shakespeare, and later Bishop of Gloucester, wrote that he doubted whether so "execrable a heap of nonsense had ever appeared in any learned language as Grey's commentaries on Hudibras". However, Grey's misleading edition lasted: his text and footnotes were used as the basis of subsequent editions for more than a century, including: that of 1779 to which Dr Johnson contributed his "Life" of Butler; the deluxe but sloppily-edited version in two volumes by an amateur antiquarian, Treadway Russell Nash (1793; reprinted twice in the nineteenth century); new editions by John Mitford (1835), Robert Bell (1855), and Alfred Milnes (1881–83); and a cheap popular edition of 1871 in the Chandos Classics series. This Chandos Classics edition appears to have stayed securely in print well into the early twentieth century.

R. Brimley Johnson (1867–1932) was the first editor to start setting a better standard for Hudibras. His edition (1893) begins with a detailed assessment of the textual history. This is followed by a useful 26-page listing of works modelled on Hudibras by other people, up to 1821. Twelve years later there was a new edition by A.R. Waller (1867–1922; Cambridge University Press, 1905). Neither Johnson nor Waller had accurately sorted the textual history, so neither could establish an authoritative text, but at least they both dropped Grey's misleading Church of England-focused obsession, and a good many of his partisan footnotes, so letting Butler tell his story from his own standpoint.

In what is now the standard edition (Oxford University: Clarendon Press, 1967), the editor, John Wilders, assessed all the early editions and chose as his copy text the 1674 edition of Parts One and Two and the 1678 edition of Part Three, these making up, as they do, Butler's approved final text. Wilders gave the variant readings in the textual history at the foot of each page, and provided explanatory notes and an index.

== Hudibrastic style after Hudibras ==
Butler was not the inventor of the rhymed octosyllabic couplet, the Hudibrastic, but he greatly popularised it, and it became a new fashion as soon as Hudibras appeared in print. Charles Cotton (1630–1687) was one of the earliest to pick up on the new fashion, with a burlesque travesty (1664) of Book One of Virgil's Aeneid, beginning:

I sing the man, (read it who list,
A Trojan, true, as ever pist)
Who from Troy Town, by wind and weather
To Italy, (and God knows whither)
Was packt, and wrackt, and lost, and tost,
And bounc'd from Pillar unto Post.

This first phase of the fashion lasted into the eighteenth century: Ned Ward tried to translate Cervantes's entire Don Quixote into English Hudibrastics: The Life and Notable Adventures of that Renown'd Knight, Don Quixote De la Mancha. Merrily Translated into Hudibrastick Verse (1711–12). In his edition of Hudibras (1893) R. Brimley Johnson published the remark: "...a very voluminous writer, but a sorry imitator of Butler, the notorious Ned Ward, an industrious retailer of ale and scurrility. We shall not meddle with his 'London Spy', a coarse, but tolerably faithful portraiture of London manners, or with his horrible version of 'Don Quixote'."

By contrast, Matthew Prior's Alma: Or, the Progress of the Mind (1718) is written in fluent, well-formed and witty Hudibrastics, in which he pays a thoughtful and detailed tribute to the breadth and depth of Butler's artistry.

But shall we idly take the MUSE abroad,
To drop her idly on the road?
And leave our Subject in the middle;
As BUTLER did his Bear and Fiddle?
He, consummate Master, knew
When to recede, and where pursue:
His noble Negligences teach,
What Others Toils despair to reach.
He, perfect Dancer, climbs the Rope,
And balances your Fear and Hope:
If after some distinguish'd Leap,
He drops his Pole, and seems to slip;
Straight gath'ring all his active Strength,
He rises higher half his Length.
With Wonder You approve his Slight;
And owe your Pleasure to your Fright.

Most important of all, however, beginning thirty years after Butler finished Hudibras, Jonathan Swift memorably re-established and renewed the Hudibrastic couplet as an important literary resource in much of his satirical verse, from Baucis and Philemon (1706–09) to Verses on the Death of Dr Swift (1731–32).

For more about the development and use of Hudibrastic verse after Butler, see Hudibrastic.
