= Hudibrastic =

Type of English verse

Hudibrastic is a type of English verse named for Samuel Butler's Hudibras, published in parts from 1663 to 1678. For the poem, Butler invented a mock-heroic verse structure.

== Description ==
Instead of pentameter, the lines were written in iambic tetrameter. The rhyme scheme is the same as in heroic verse (AA BB CC DD), but Butler used frequent feminine rhyme for humor.

== Example ==
The first fourteen lines of Hudibras illustrate the verse form:

When civil dudgeon first grew high,
And men fell out they knew not why;
When hard words, jealousies, and fears,
Set folks together by the ears,
And made them fight, like mad or drunk,
For Dame Religion, as for punk;
Whose honesty they all durst swear for,
Though not a man of them knew wherefore:
When Gospel-Trumpeter, surrounded
With long-ear'd rout, to battle sounded,
And pulpit, drum ecclesiastick,
Was beat with fist, instead of a stick;
Then did Sir Knight abandon dwelling,
And out he rode a colonelling.

== Further description ==
The rhyme of "swear for" with "wherefore" and "ecclesiastic" with "(in)stead of a stick" are surprising, unnatural, and humorous. Additionally, the rhyme of "-don dwelling" with "a colonelling" is strained to the point of breaking, again for humorous effect. Further, the rhyme scheme in a Hudibrastic will imply inappropriate comparisons. For example, the rhyme of "drunk" and "punk" (meaning "a prostitute") implies that the religious ecstasies of the Puritans were the same as that of sexual intercourse and inebriation.

The hudibrastic has been traditionally used for satire. Jonathan Swift, for example, wrote nearly all of his poetry in hudibrastics.

== Other usage ==
In eighteenth-century usage, "hudibrastic" could also be used grandiloquently to indicate any general satire, as in its use for The Caricature Magazine or Hudibrastic Mirror published by Thomas Tegg between 1807 and 1819.
