= John Mickleburgh =

English chemist

- Born: c. 1692; Norwich, England
- Died: 11 May 1756
- Occupation: Chemist

John Mickleburgh (c. 1692 – 11 May 1756) was an English chemist, and the third holder of the 1702 Chair of Chemistry at the University of Cambridge.

== Early life ==
Mickleburgh was born in Norwich, the son of Thomas Mickleburgh, a weaver.

== Academic career ==
At age 17, on 30 May 1709, Mickleburgh was admitted a sizar at Caius, Cambridge. Shortly after he migrated to Corpus Christi, Cambridge, where he was made a Fellow in 1714. He secured the 1702 Chair of Chemistry in 1718, which he occupied until his death in 1756.

Among his students were John Morgan, Professor of Anatomy at Cambridge from 1728 to 1734, and his two immediate successors, George Cuthbert and Robert Bankes.
