= Giovanni Francisco Vigani =

Italian chemist

- Born: ca 1650; Verona, Republic of Venice
- Died: 1712; Newark-on-Trent, England
- Scientific career
- Workplaces: University of Cambridge

Giovanni Francisco Vigani (c. 1650–1712), known also as John Francis, was an Italian chemist who became the first professor of chemistry in the University of Cambridge.

== Life ==
Vigani was born at Verona about the middle of the seventeenth century. He travelled in Spain, France, and Holland, and studied mining, metallurgy, and pharmacy in the countries he visited. He is not known to have received an official university degree. In 1682 he published a small treatise, entitled Medulla Chymiæ. It was dedicated to a Dutchman, Joannes de Waal, and was printed and published at Danzig. During this year he probably arrived in England, first settling in Newark-on-Trent. About 1683 he took up his residence at Cambridge, and began to give private tuition in chemistry and pharmacy. In 1692 he was invited to write a treatise on chemistry, which was never completed. By this time he had become an acknowledged teacher of the subject in Cambridge, and, though still independent of university support, had acquired a reputation.

In 1703 the Senate of the University of Cambridge passed a resolution "investing with the title of professor of chemistry John Francis Vigani, a native of Verona, who had taught chemistry with reputation in Cambridge for twenty years previously." In 1705 he was lecturing on pharmaceutical chemistry at Queens' College. According to controversial pamphlets about Richard Bentley's actions as master of Trinity College, Cambridge it is likely that Vigani, as newly created professor, gave instruction in the laboratory which had been constructed there by the master against the wishes of the senior fellows. During all these years Vigani spent part of his time in Newark. He was buried there in February 1712. The vacancy in the professorship which was occasioned by his death was filled in 1713 by the appointment of John Waller, B.D.

Isaac Newton's amanuensis Humphrey Newton (not a relation) wrote that Vigani was one of the few Cambridge scholars "in whose company [Isaac Newton] took much delight and pleasure at an evening." However, according to Newton's half-niece Catherine Barton, despite his "pleasure in discoursing with [Vigani] on chemistry", Newton eventually broke off all contact with Vigani after the latter offended him by telling him "a loose story about a nun."

Vigani, in the disputes in which Bentley was involved, remained on good terms with both sides. He never seems to have mastered the English language. According to Abraham de la Pryme, who attended his lectures, Vigani was a great traveller and a learned chemist, but a 'drunken fellow.' In one of his letters, however, Vigani emphasises the benefits of a temperate life. He married, about 1682, shortly after his arrival in England. A daughter Frances was baptised there in January 1683; another, Jane, in March 1684. His wife, whose name was Elizabeth, died at Newark at the close of 1711.

== Works ==
The treatise Medulla Chymiæ was originally of 19 pages (Danzig, 1682). It was considerably enlarged, and editions appeared in 1683, 1685, 1693, and 1718–19. As the author explains, it was intended to record his own experiments and improvements in the preparation of certain compounds. Vigani was commended by Georg Ernst Stahl for his practical skill and avoidance of speculation unsupported by experiment. He rather avoided theoretical discussions, referring those who felt interested in them to Robert Boyle, while he himself pursued practical investigation. Among other things, Vigani devised a method for purifying iron sulphate from copper; for making ammonium sulphate; and for proving that to form a given salt a metallic base takes always the same amount of acid. He also invented a furnace that could be easily built up or taken to pieces as required.
