= Little St Mary's, Cambridge =

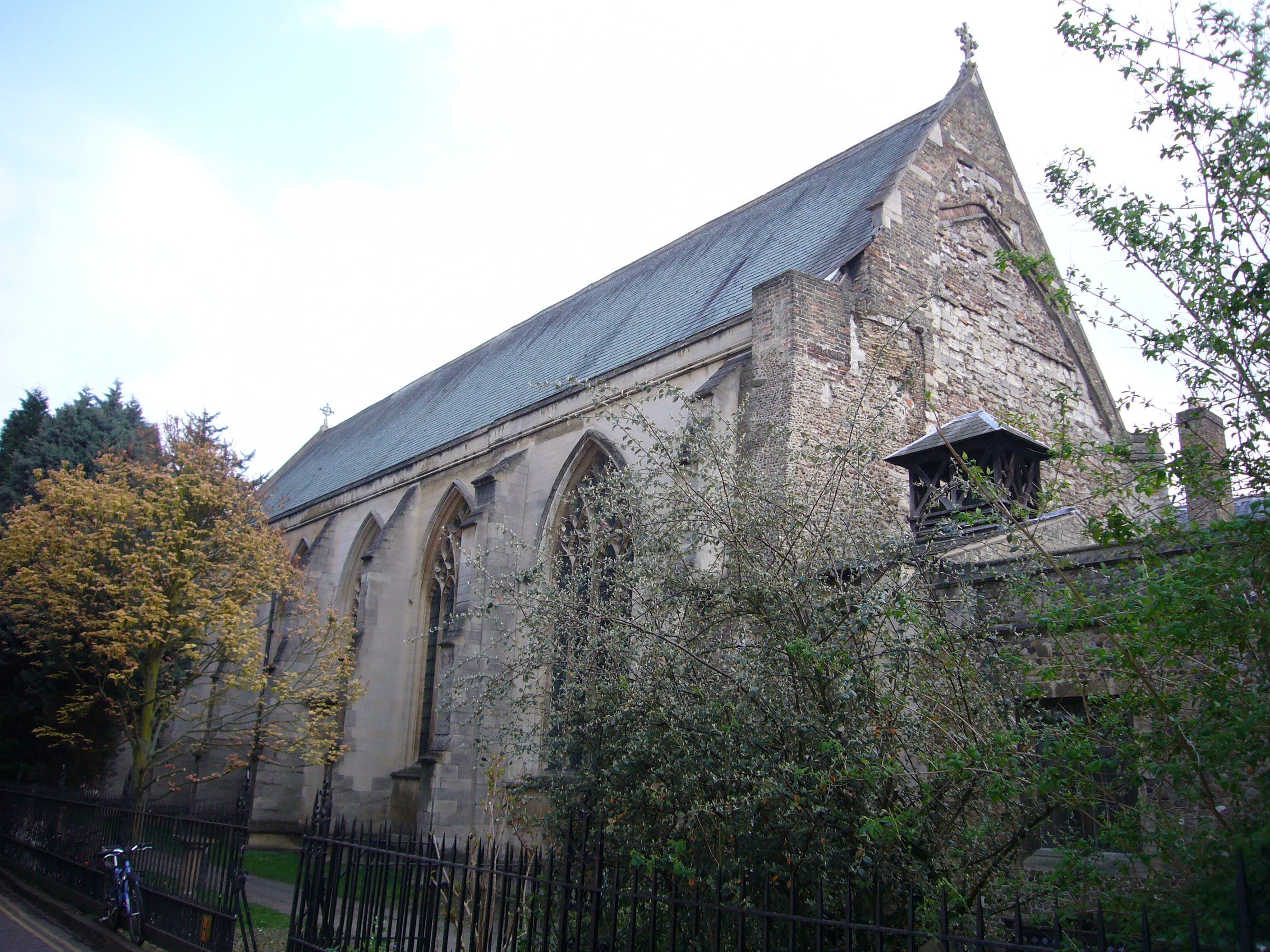
- The church, viewed from the North West

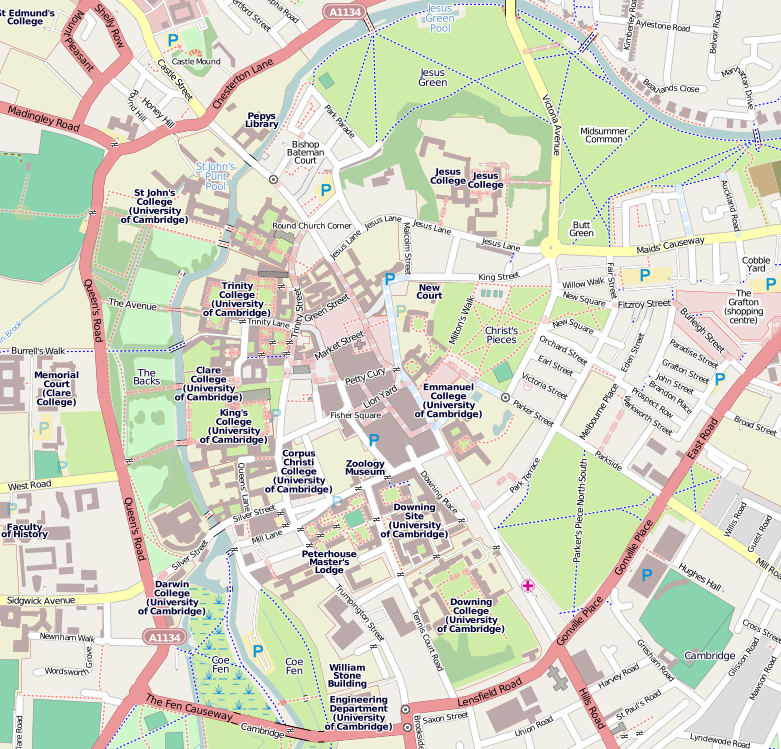
- Location in central Cambridge
- 52°12′04″N 0°07′05″E
- Location: Cambridge
- Country: England
- Denomination: Anglican
- Previous denomination: Roman Catholic
- Churchmanship: Anglo-Catholic
- Website: http://www.lsm.org.uk

History
- Dedication: Blessed Virgin Mary
- Dedicated: 1352

Little St Mary's or St Mary the Less is a Church of England parish church in Cambridge, England, on Trumpington Street between Pembroke College's Mill Lane Project development site and Peterhouse. The church is in the Diocese of Ely and follows the Anglo-Catholic or high-church tradition of the Church of England. In addition to its main Sunday Mass, the church has a strong tradition of daily morning and evening prayer, regular weekday Communion and the keeping of church festivals. The church has a particular ministry helping both men and women to explore possible vocations to the priesthood. Little St Mary's has active overseas mission links, provides support to local mental health projects, and participates in Hope Cambridge's Churches Homeless Project. The vicar is Canon Robert Mackley, who has been the incumbent since 2012.

== History ==
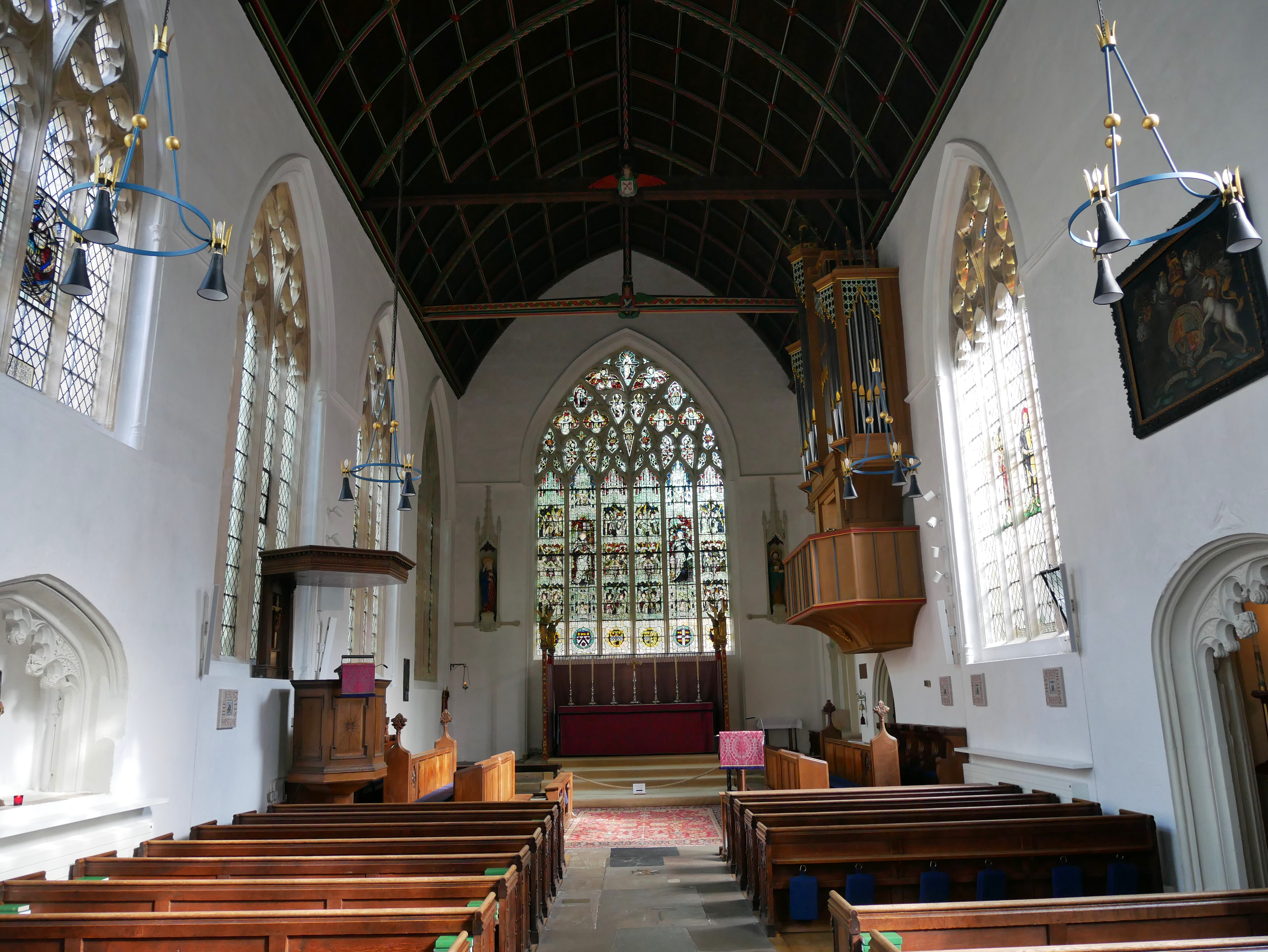
View towards the sanctuary

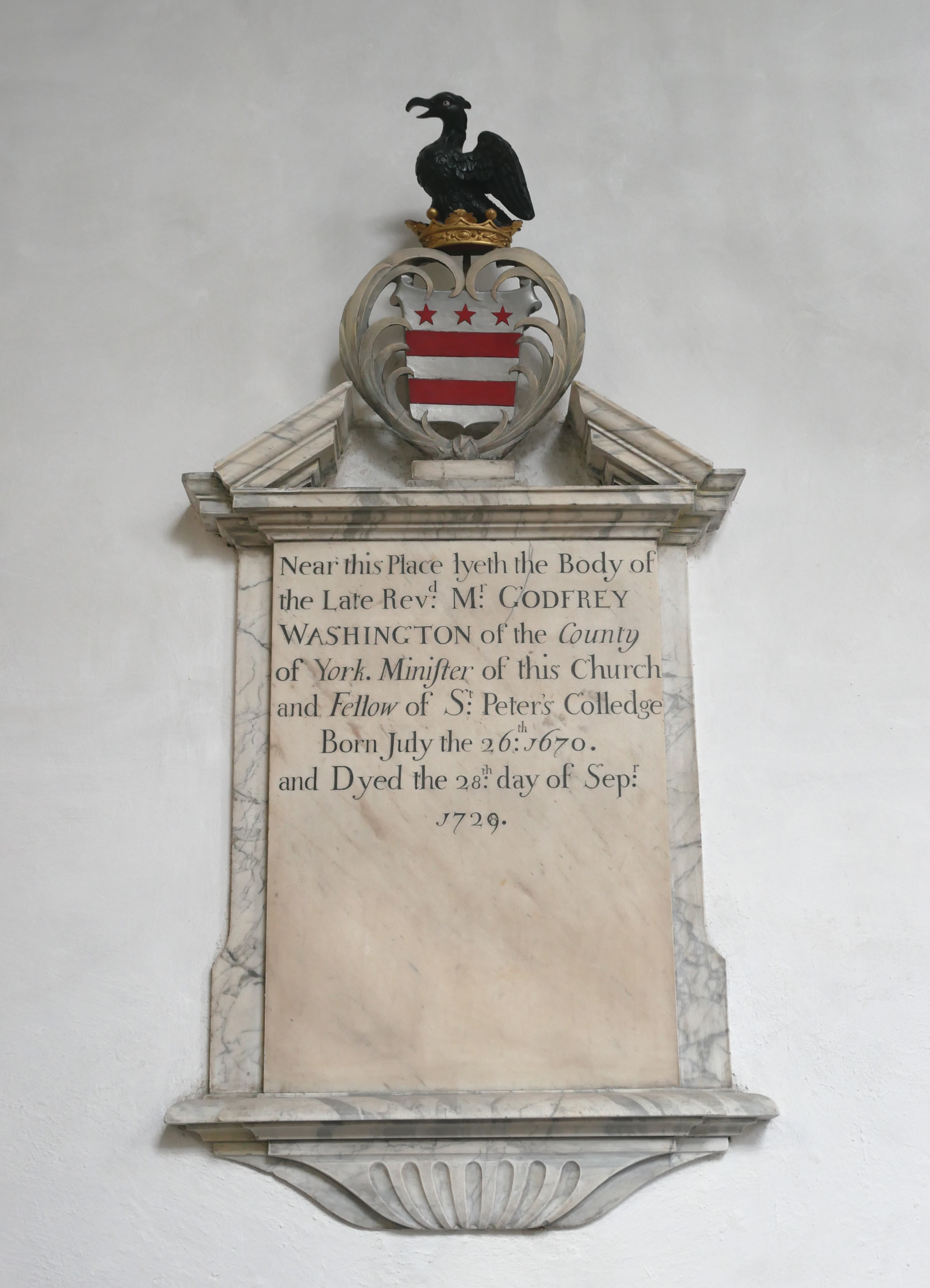
Godfrey Washington's monument with the Washington family arms on the north side of the nave. He was the great-uncle of President George Washington.

There has been a place of worship on the site since around the twelfth century. The earliest known records of the church state that the first church here was called St Peter-without-Trumpington Gate, to distinguish it from St Peter by the Castle (or ad castrum). It was controlled by three successive generations of the same family until 1207. After that date it was given to the Hospital of St John the Evangelist and served by chaplains from that foundation.

In the early 1280s Hugh de Balsham, Bishop of Ely, lodged some scholars in the Hospital but to his dismay found soon that the sick and the students could not live in harmony together. The students were moved in 1284 to the site of what is now Peterhouse; this was the origin of the first Cambridge college. By the 1340s the church was in such a bad state that the fellows of Peterhouse decided to rebuild it. In 1352, the new building had the dual purpose of College Chapel (to Peterhouse) and Parish Church. At this time, it was rededicated to the Blessed Virgin Mary. In 1632 Peterhouse built a separate Chapel and St Mary the Less reverted to being solely a Parish Church.

Richard Crashaw, the metaphysical poet, was a priest there from 1638 to 1643, at the same time that he was a Fellow of Peterhouse. In 1643, after his departure, many of the Church's ornaments and statues were damaged or destroyed by the Puritan iconoclast William Dowsing. The damage to the sedilia and the archway leading to the present-day Lady Chapel has never been repaired.

1643. At Little Mary’s, December 29, 30, we brake downe 60 superstitious pictures, some popes, and crucifixes, and God the Father sitting in a chayer, and holding a globe in His hand.

— The Journal of William Dowsing

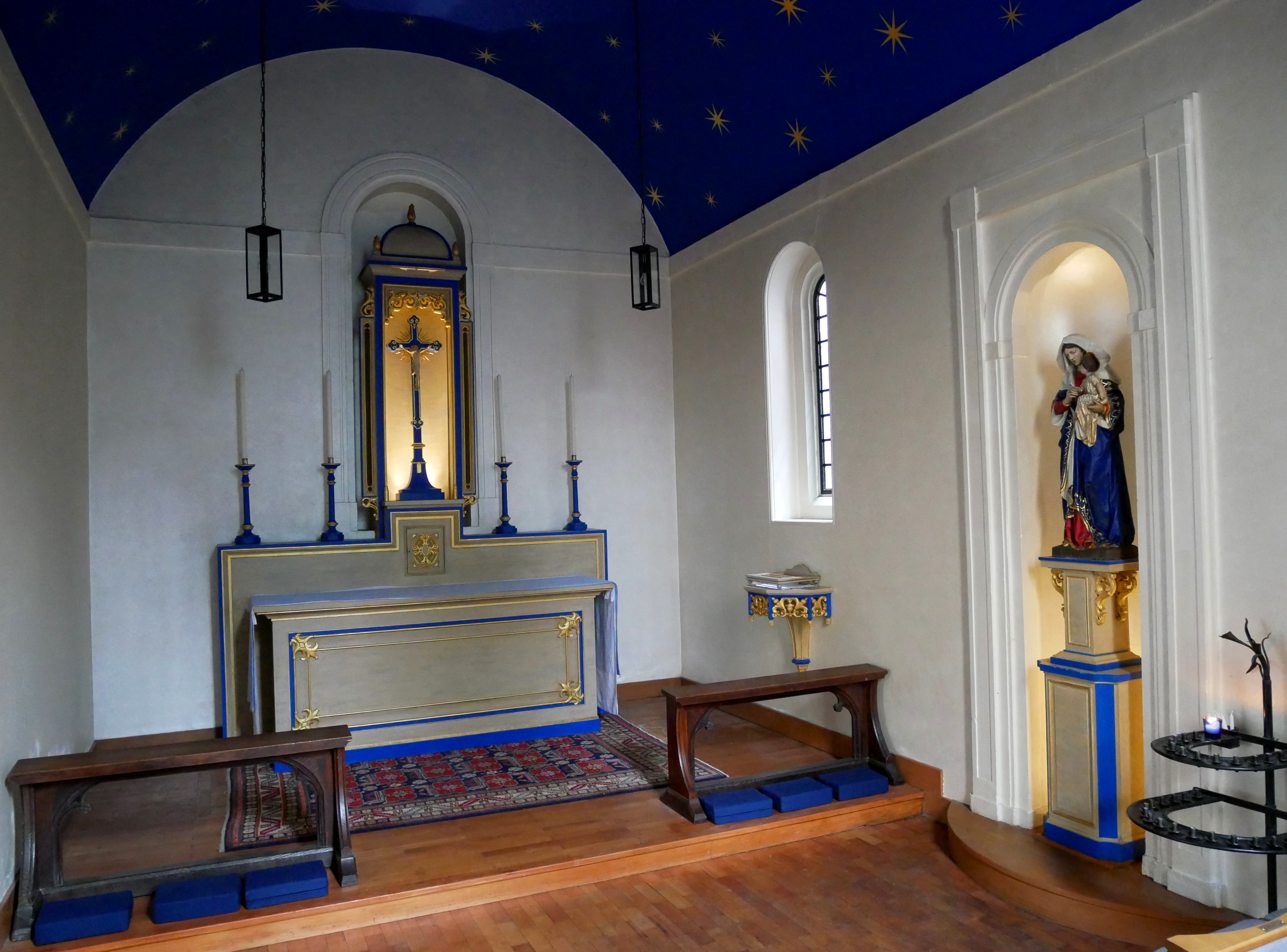
The Lady Chapel, added to the south side of the nave

In 1741 the church was refitted with wooden panelling, box pews, choir gallery, and the present pulpit. From 1856–7 Sir George Gilbert Scott restored the church and removed the 18th-century panelling. Further restoration work was carried out in 1876 and 1891, but by 1880 the church was much as it is now. The south, or Lady, Chapel was added in 1931 and designed by Thomas Henry Lyon, the architect of Sidney Sussex College Chapel. The Parish Centre at the west end of the church was built in 1892 and enlarged in 1990 and again in 2011.

The Reverend Godfrey Washington (the great-uncle of US President George Washington), who died on 28 September 1729, is buried in Little St Mary's. His memorial is on the north wall close to the main door.

The Dutch organist, violinist, and composer Pieter Hellendaal (1721–1799), who was organist for Pembroke College, Peterhouse and Little St Mary's, is buried in the churchyard.

Little St Mary's has been a Grade II* listed building since 1950.

== Stained glass ==
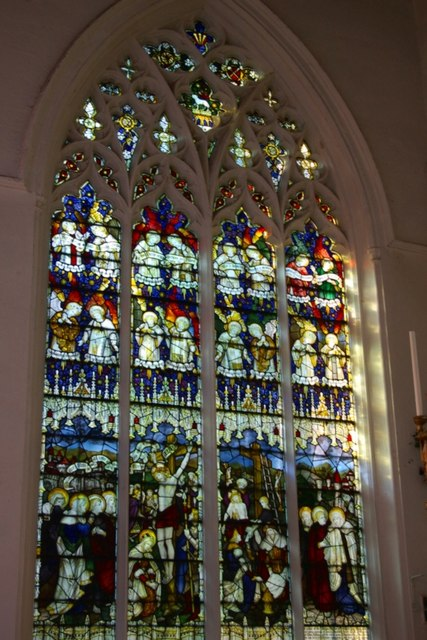
North-east window, by Charles Eamer Kempe

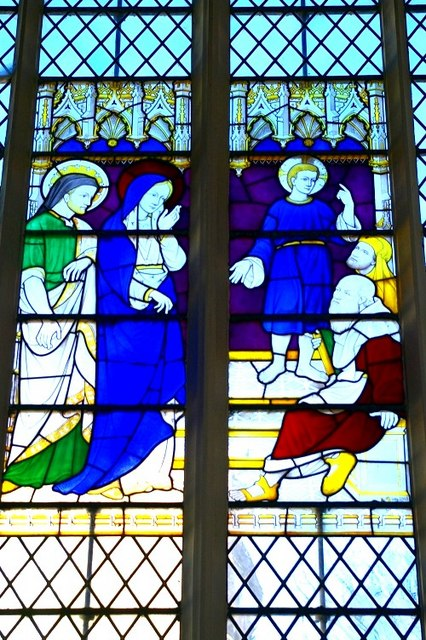
Stained glass by Harry Stammers, depicting the Finding of Christ in the Temple

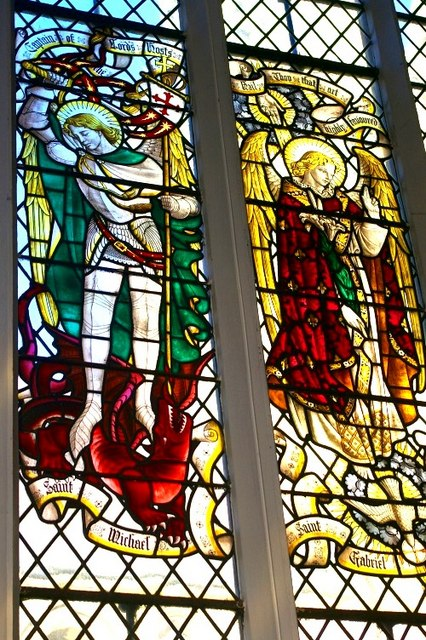
SS Michael and Gabriel by John Samuel Bucknall (1917-1989)

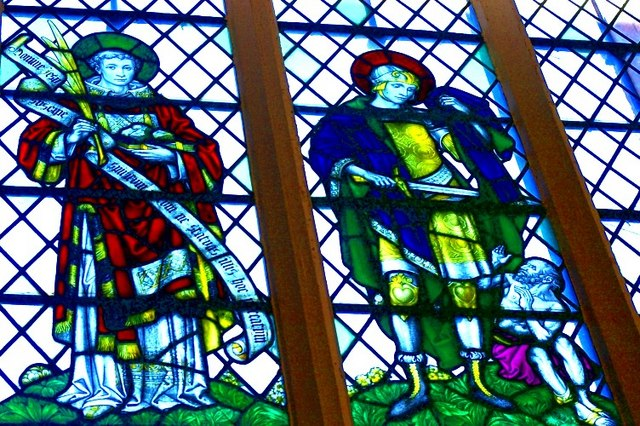
SS Stephen and Martin by F. C. Eden, installed in 1936 in memory of Edwin Charles Ogle

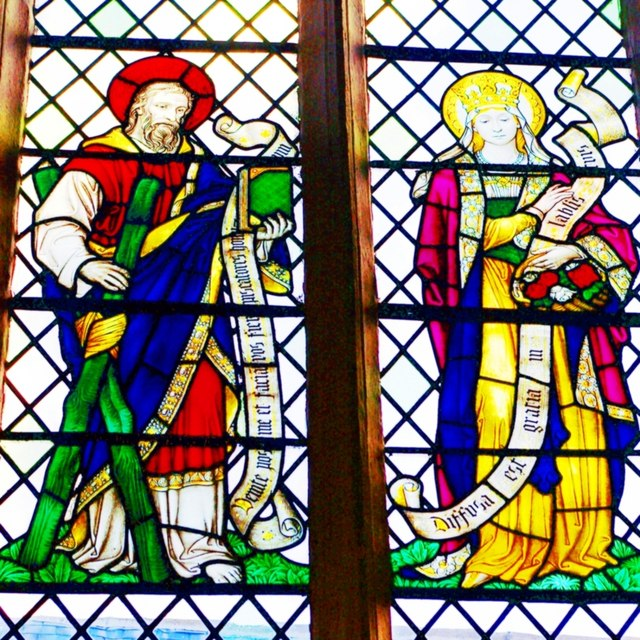
St Andrew and St Elisabeth by F. C. Eden

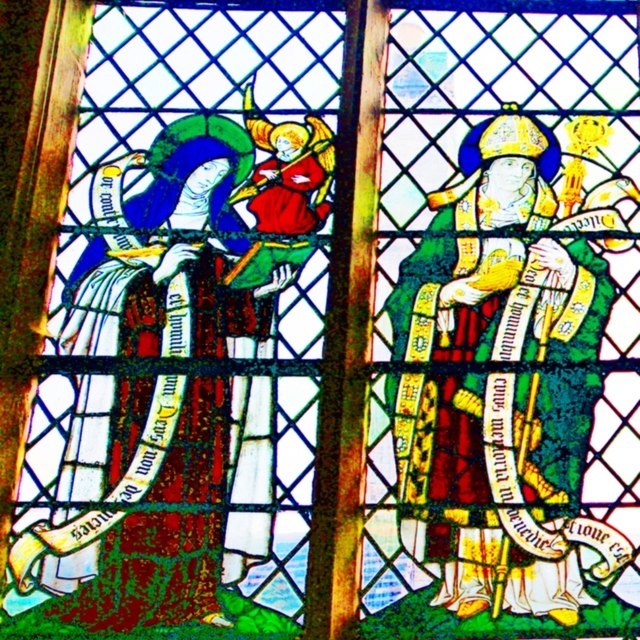
St Teresa and St Nicholas. Left-hand half of a four-light window by F. C. Eden, placed in memory of Mary Hamblin Clay (1860-1929)

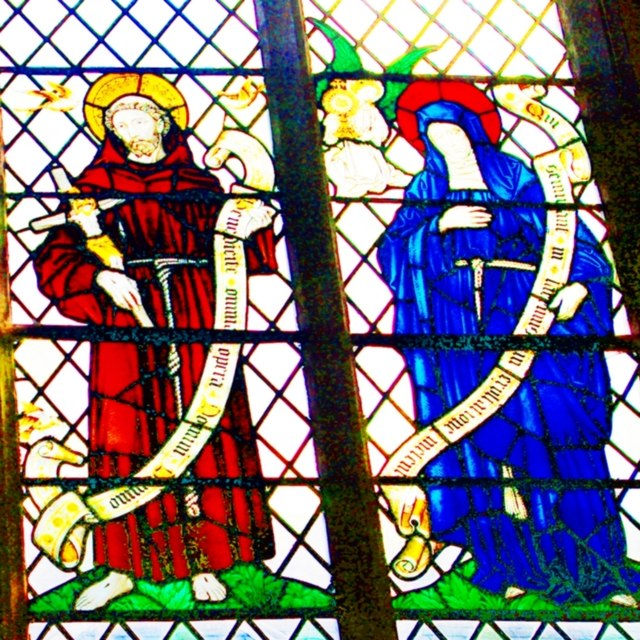
St Francis and St Monica. Right-hand half of a four-light window by F. C. Eden, placed in memory of Mary Hamblin Clay (1860-1929)
