= John Hadley (chemist) =

English chemist and physician

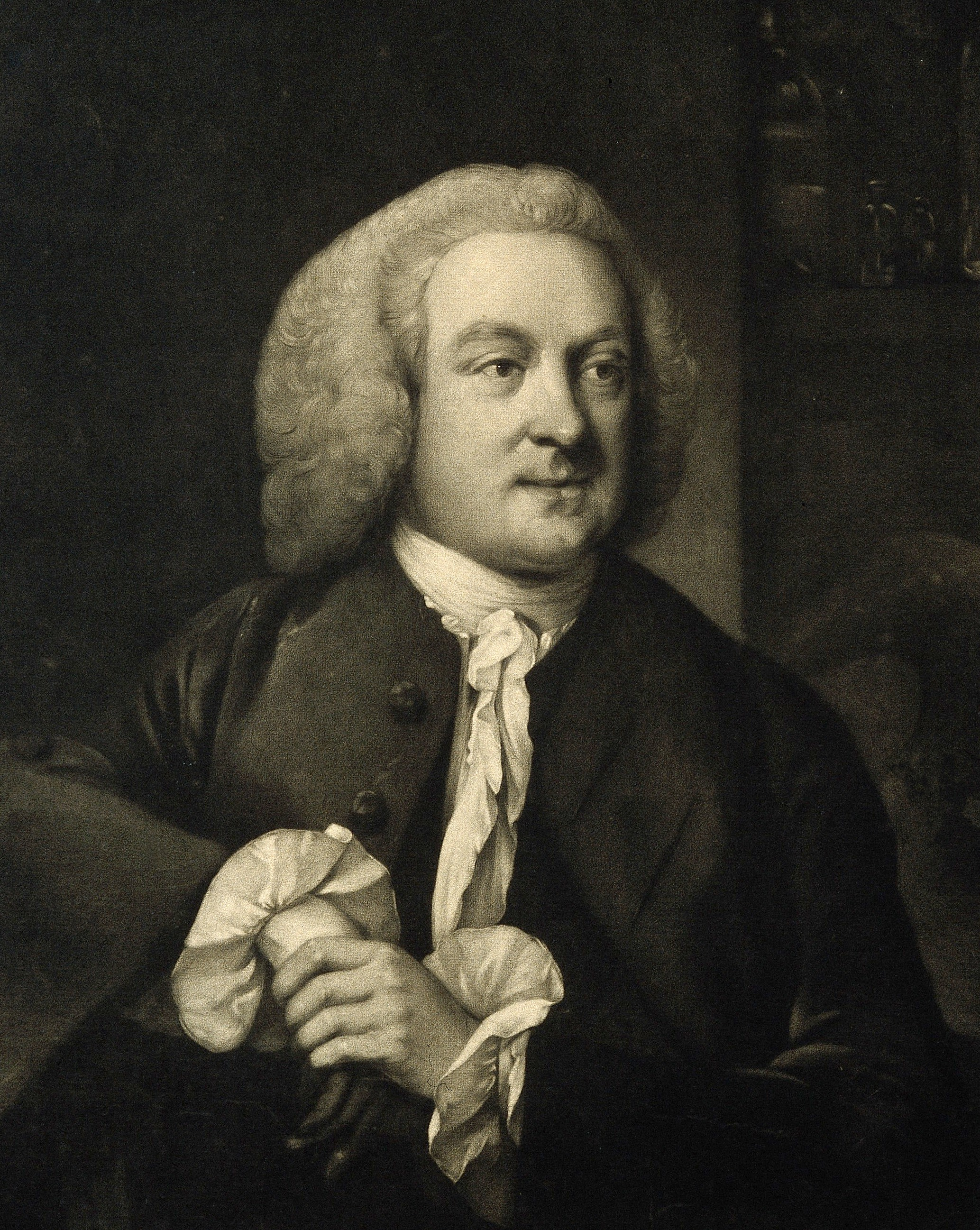
John Hadley in 1759

John Hadley (1731 – 5 November 1764) was an English chemist and physician.

Born in London to Henry Hadley, he was educated at Queens' College, Cambridge, graduating B.A. in 1753.

In 1756 he was appointed the fourth Professor of Chemistry at Cambridge University, the oldest continuously occupied chair of Chemistry in the UK. During his time there he co-operated in 1758 with Benjamin Franklin on a series of experiments to investigate latent heat. They found that a mercury thermometer sprayed with ether which was then evaporated by blowing could fall to −7 degrees Celsius in a warm room.

The Professorship was unpaid so Hadley studied medicine and obtained in 1758 a Physick Fellowship. He then moved to London in 1760 and got a post as Assistant Physician at St Thomas' Hospital. In 1763 he became full Physician to Charterhouse School and became a Fellow of the Royal College of Physicians.

In 1758 he was elected as a Fellow of the Royal Society. On 16 December 1763 he carried out the first recorded dissection of a mummy in British history. He died in 1764 of a fever at the age of 33.
