= Jacksonian Professor of Natural Philosophy =

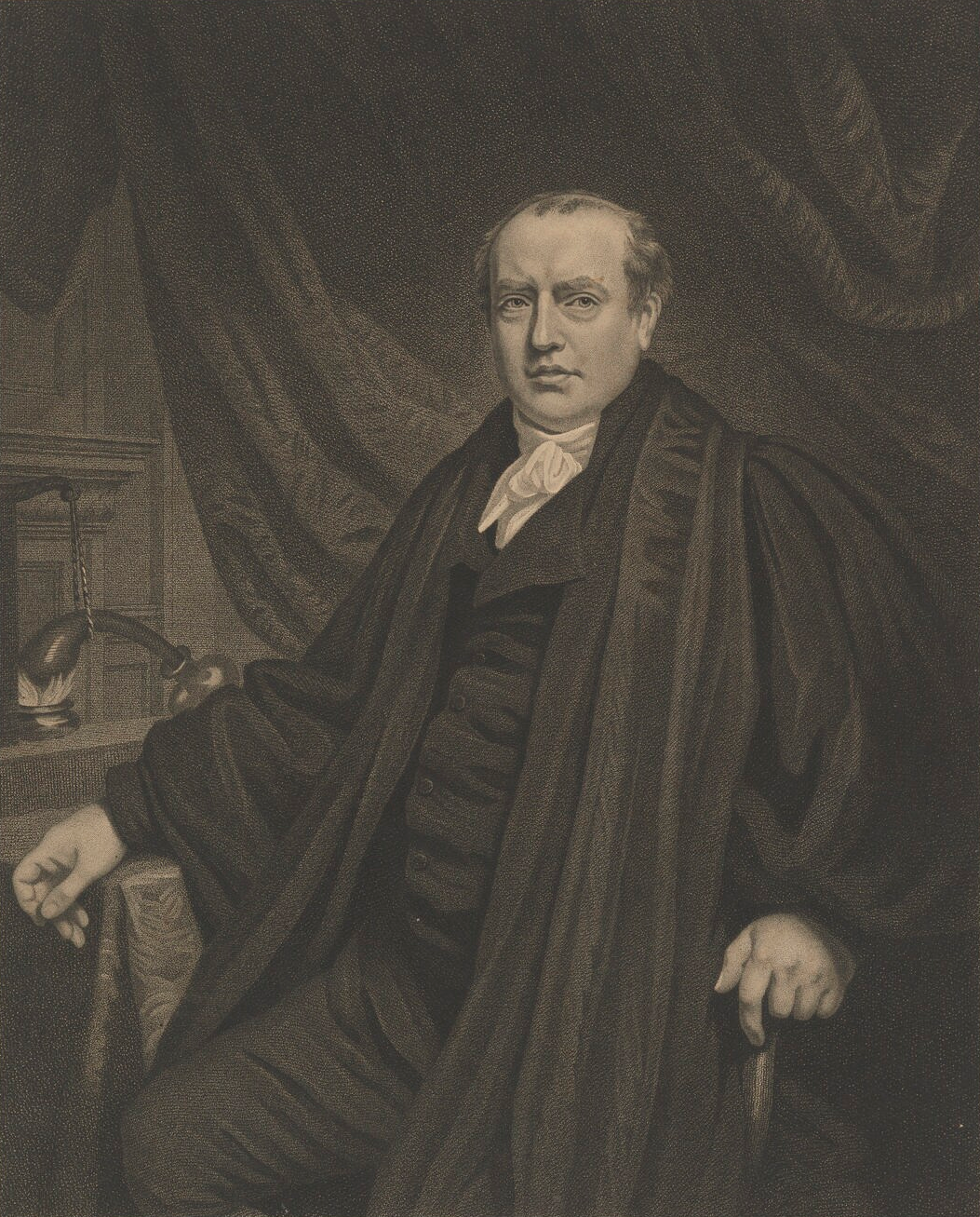
Isaac Milner, first Jacksonian Professor from 1783 to 1792

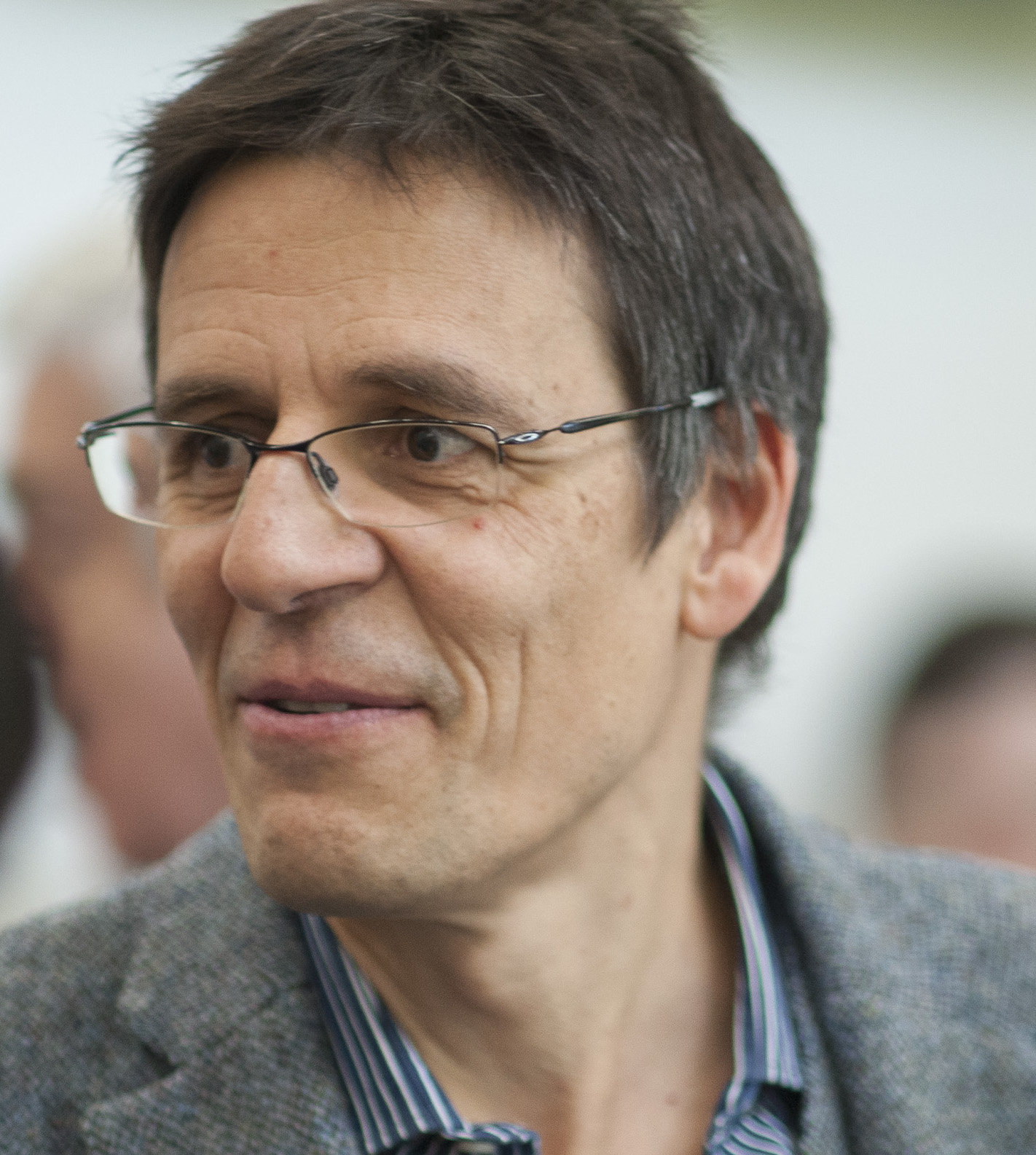
Didier Queloz, incumbent Jacksonian Professor since 2021

The Jacksonian Professorship of Natural Philosophy is one of the senior chairs in Natural and Experimental philosophy at Cambridge University. It was founded in 1782 by a bequest from the Reverend Richard Jackson of Tarrington, Herefordshire.

Jackson, a former fellow of Trinity College, died in 1782. He left a fifth of the income from his estate to the head gardener of the university's physic garden and the remainder to found the Professorship of Natural and Experimental Philosophy that now bears his name. His will specified the details of the professor with much precision, including that preference should be given to candidates from Trinity and men from Staffordshire, Warwickshire, Derbyshire and Cheshire, and that any holder must search for a cure for gout.

The will also stated that his lectures should promote "real and useful knowledge" by "showing or doing something in the way of experiment upon the subject undertaken to be treated," and its early holders consequently tended towards the experimental end of the field, such as chemists and engineers. More recently, it has been decided that the professorship should permanently be associated with physics.

The first holder of the position was the mathematician and chemist Isaac Milner, elected to the post in 1783.

One result of the bequest was that a building was erected to allow public lectures for the professor, as well as the professor of botany. It was the university's first building to be specifically designed for the teaching of science.

By 2020, the Jacksonian endowment was no longer sufficient to fund the professorship. In order to afford an appointment to the Jacksonian Professorship, a funded professorship needed to be held vacant.

== Jacksonian Professors ==
- Isaac Milner (1783–1792)
- Francis Wollaston (1792–1813)
- William Farish (1813–1837)
- Robert Willis (1837–1875)
- James Dewar (1875–1923)
- C. T. R. Wilson (1925–1934)
- Edward Appleton (1936–1939)
- John Cockcroft (1939–1946)
- Otto Frisch (1947–1972)
- Alan Cook (1972–1990)
- Malcolm Longair (1991–2008)
- James Stirling (2008–2013)
- Didier Queloz (2021–)
