= St Peter's Church, Cambridge =

Church in Cambridge, England

Coordinates: 52°12′39.8″N 0°6′50″E

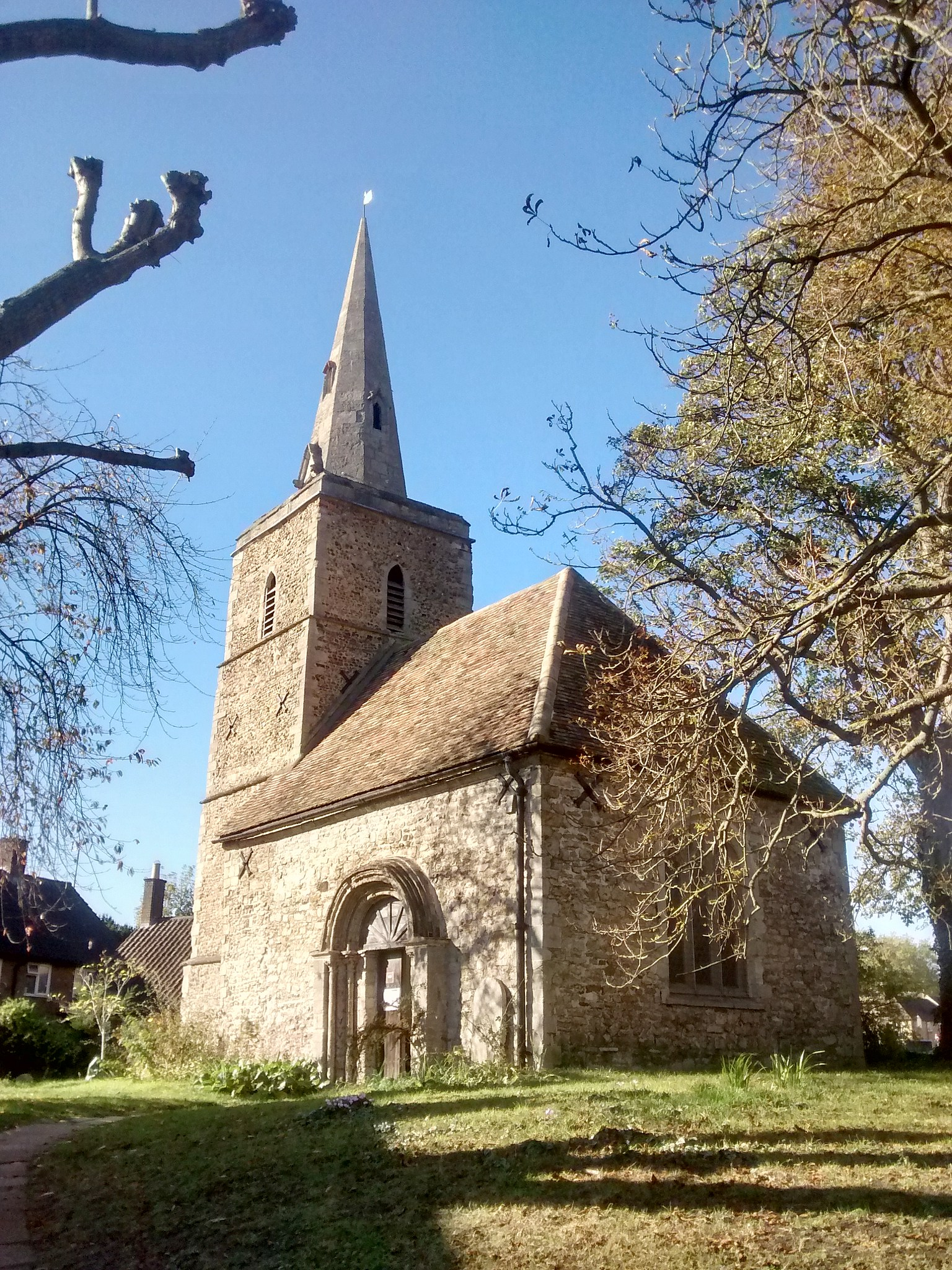
St Peter's Church, Cambridge in October 2018

The Church of St Peter is a redundant Church of England (Anglican) church in Cambridge, in the Parish of the Ascension of the Diocese of Ely, located on Castle Street between Honey Hill and Kettle's Yard. The church is now in the care of the Churches Conservation Trust.

The church is usually open and sometimes hosts art exhibitions in cooperation with the Kettle's Yard gallery.

== History ==
The church has been known as "St Peter by the Castle" (ad castrum) or "Beyond the Bridge" to distinguish it from St Peter-without-Trumpington Gate (now Little St Mary's).

The present structure is the remnant of one that went back to the 12th century, with a nave, chancel, south aisle, and west tower and spire. Former county archaeologist Alison Taylor suggests that, due to its location, across the Roman road from St Giles' Church, it may have its origins in the Anglo-Saxon period but no evidence of the church prior to the Norman period has currently been discovered. Under the Tudor monarchy, the advowson came to the Crown, and Elizabeth I granted it to the See of Ely. In 1650 the town commissioners found that St Peter's had neither parsonage nor vicarage, and recommended that the parish should be united with St Giles'. It has been annexed to the vicarage of St Giles for several hundred years.

St Peter's is now a single-cell church with a west tower and an octagonal 14th-century spire with dormers. Construction is of stone rubble with pebble for the tower and ashlar for the spire. The church was rebuilt on a reduced scale in 1781, although there are several surviving medieval details. It has a 13th-century south doorway, and a 12th-century font, decorated with mermen at the angles. By the beginning of the 20th Century the building was almost derelict again. The weathervane has the initials AP; these are said to be those of Andrew Perne, a self-serving sixteenth-century vice-chancellor of Cambridge University and dean of Ely. The initials were said to denote 'A Papist', 'A Protestant', or 'A Puritan', depending on which way the wind blew.

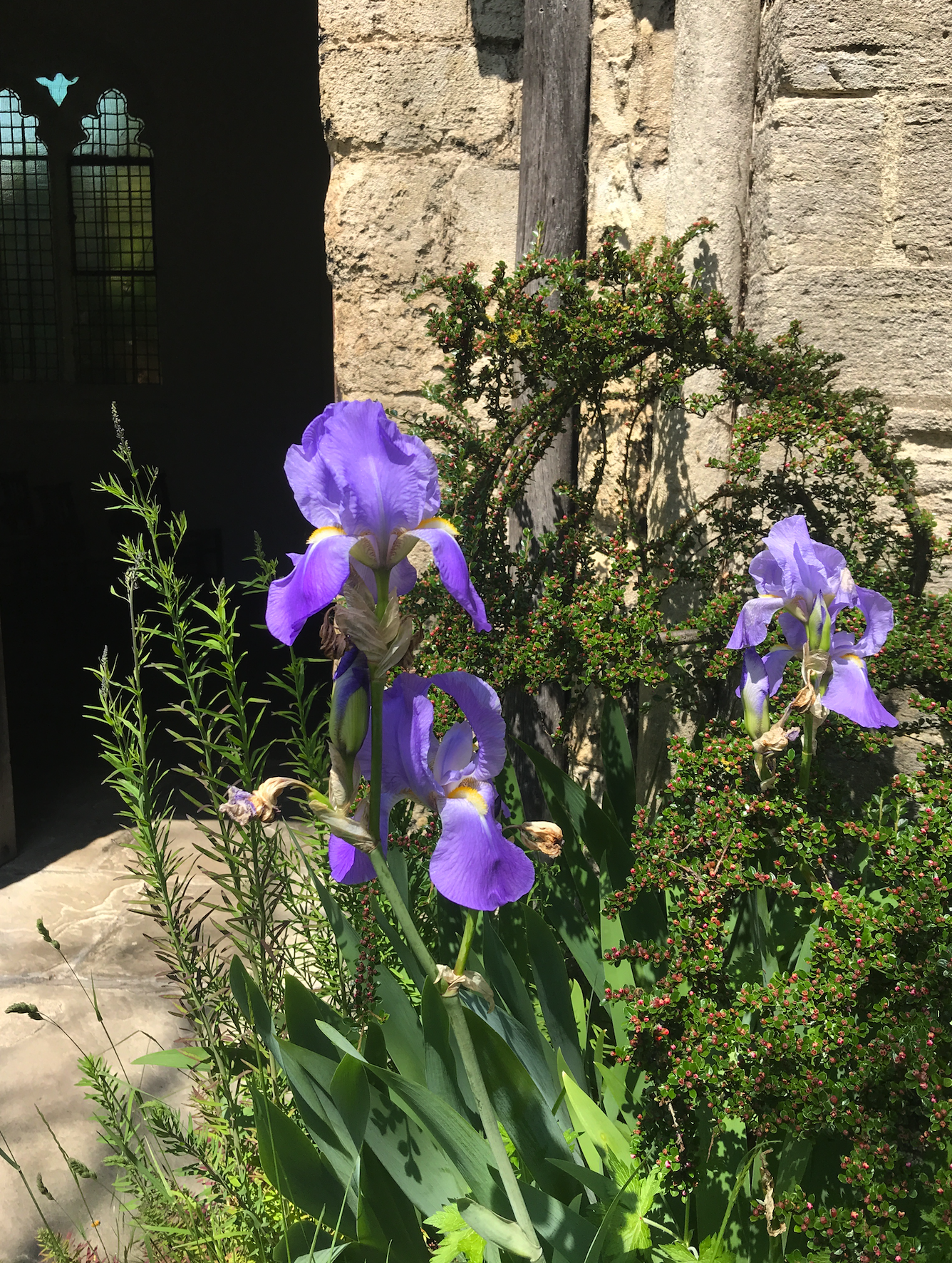
Bearded Iris by the Church entrance

The church was gradually restored with concreted stone in the 1930s.

== Gallery ==
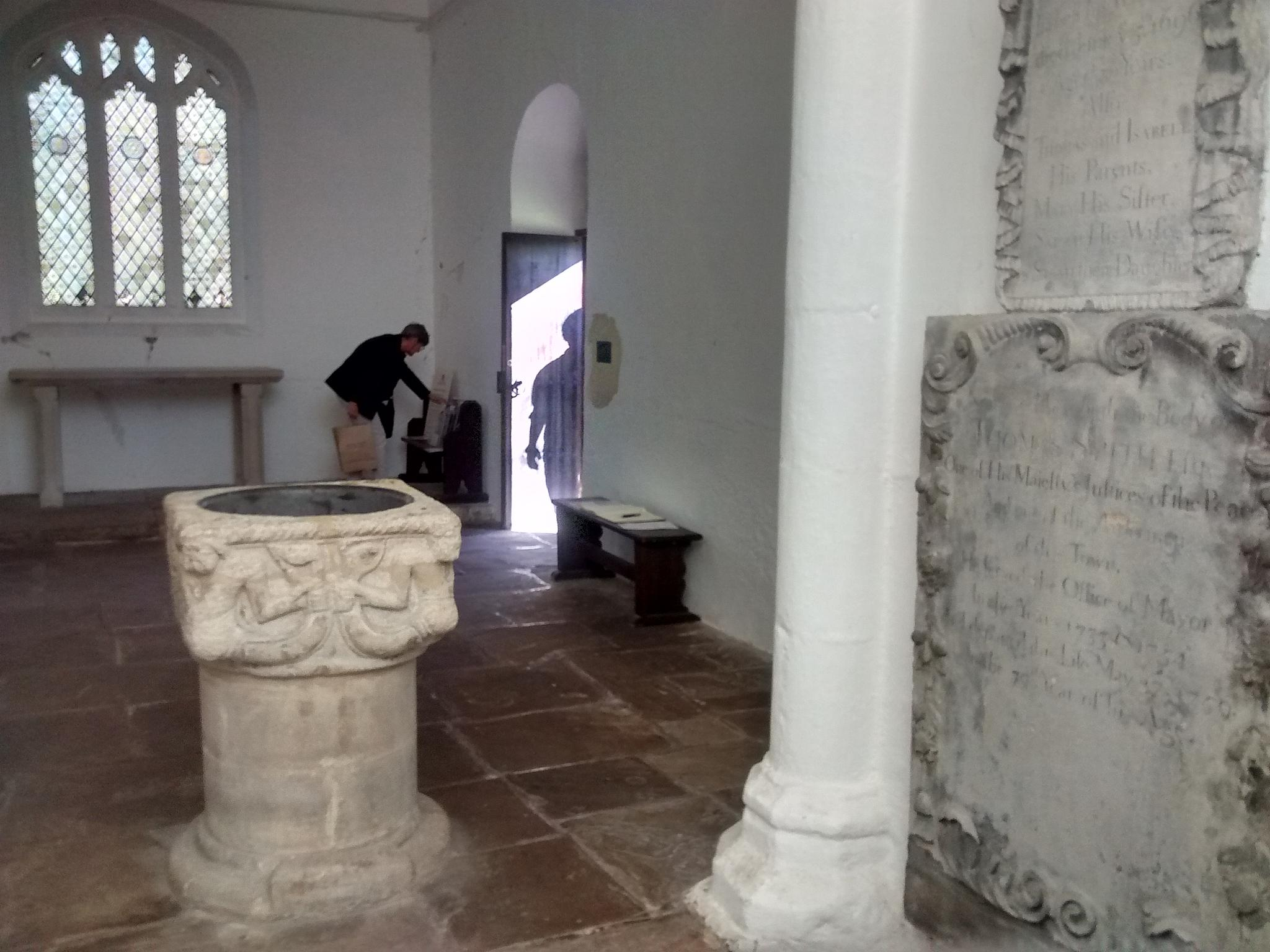
Interior from under the tower

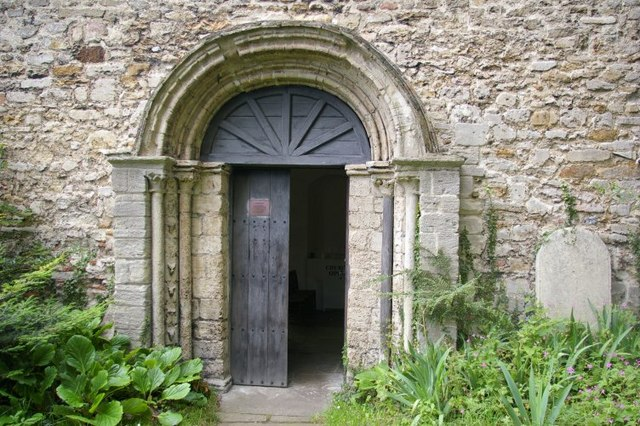
South door

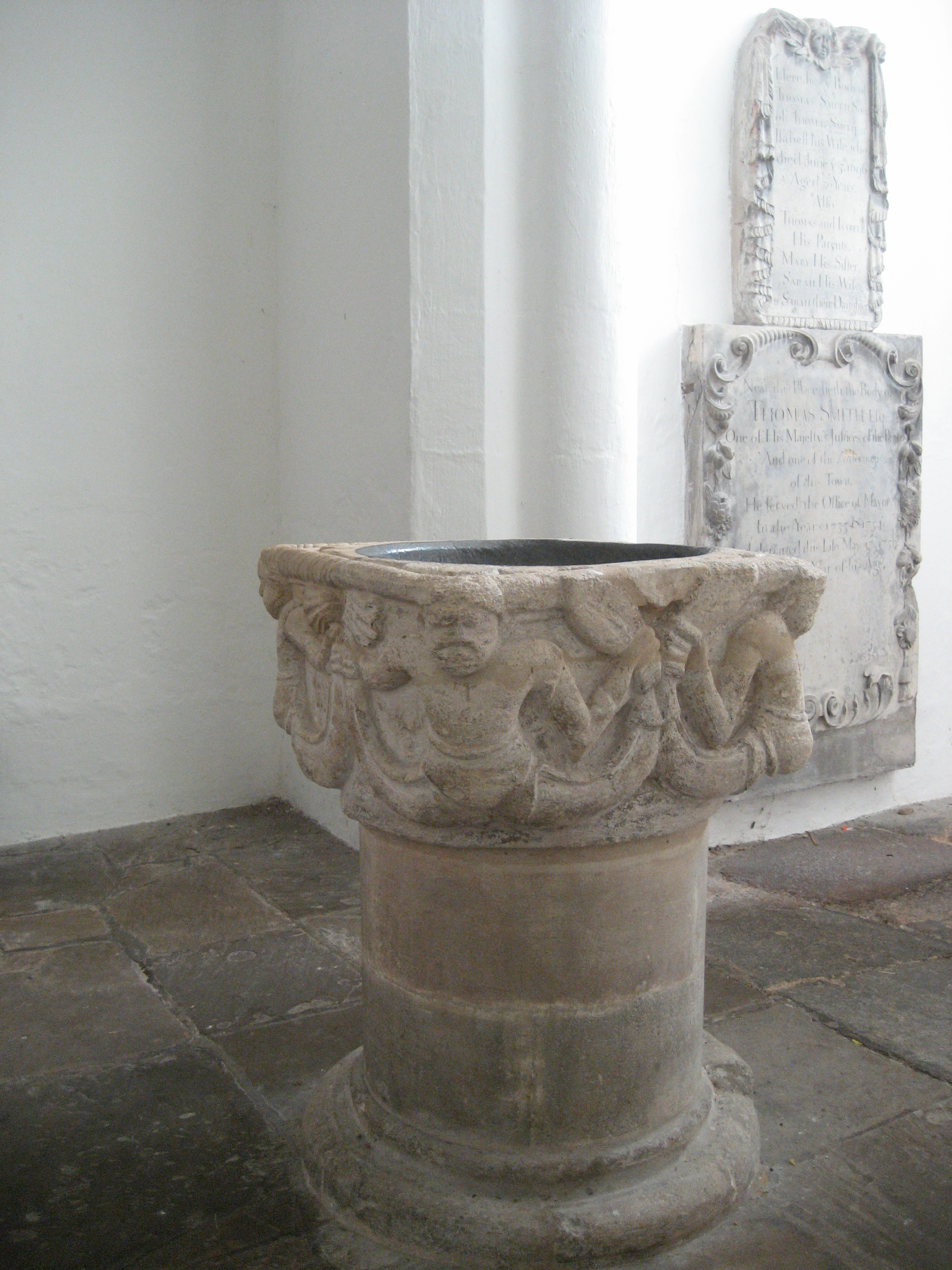
12th-century baptismal font

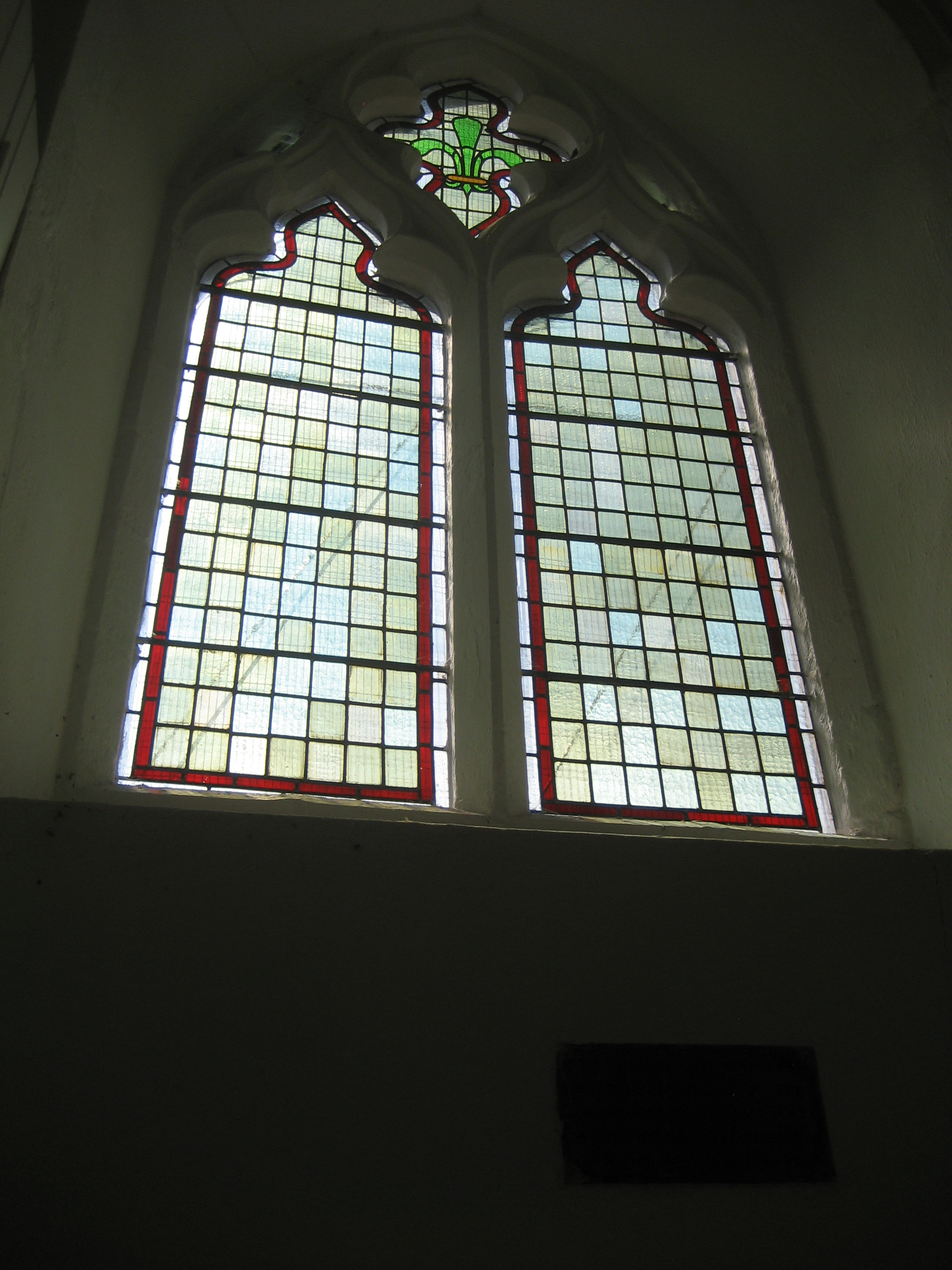
Stained glass

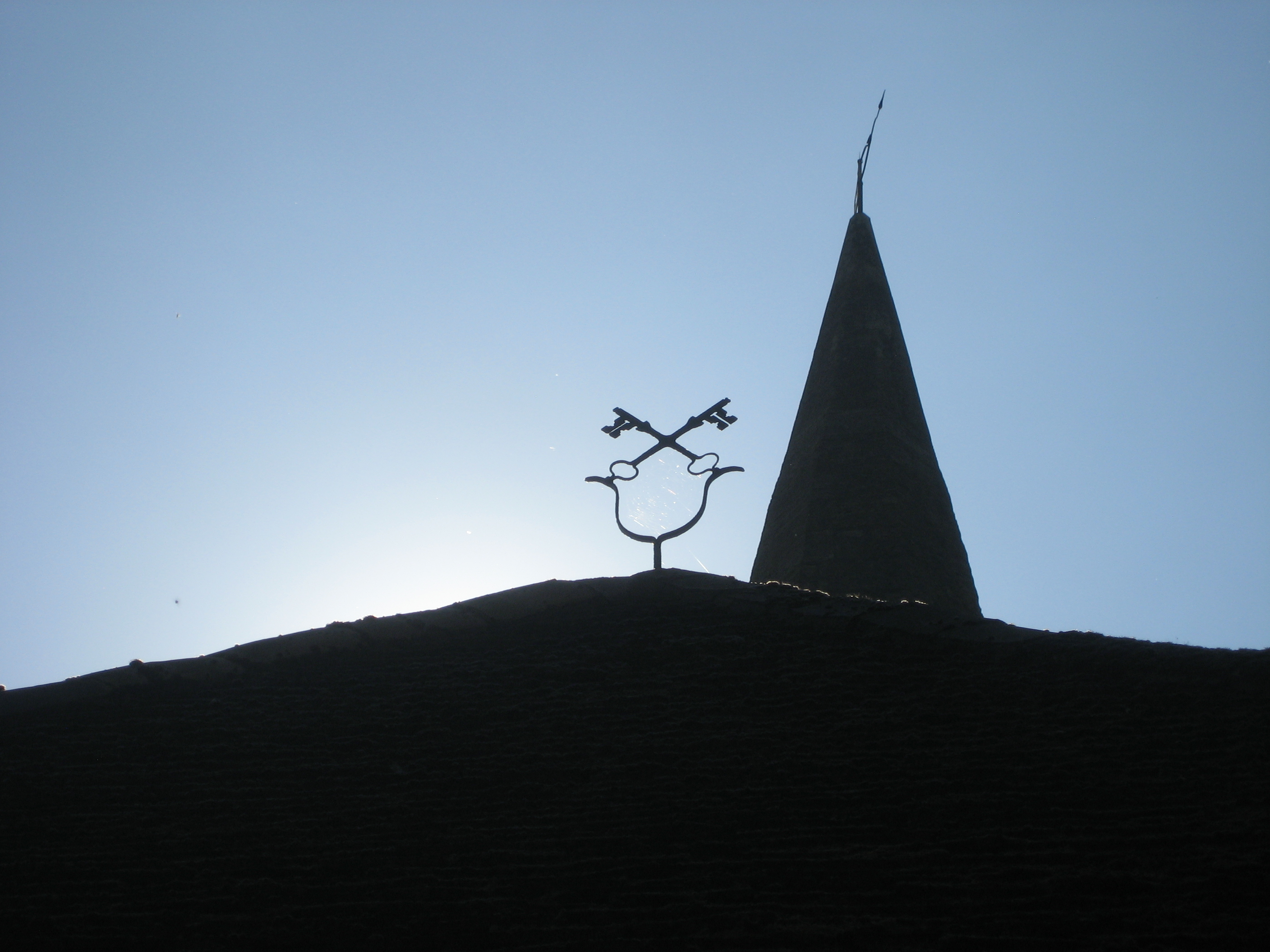
Saint Peter's keys

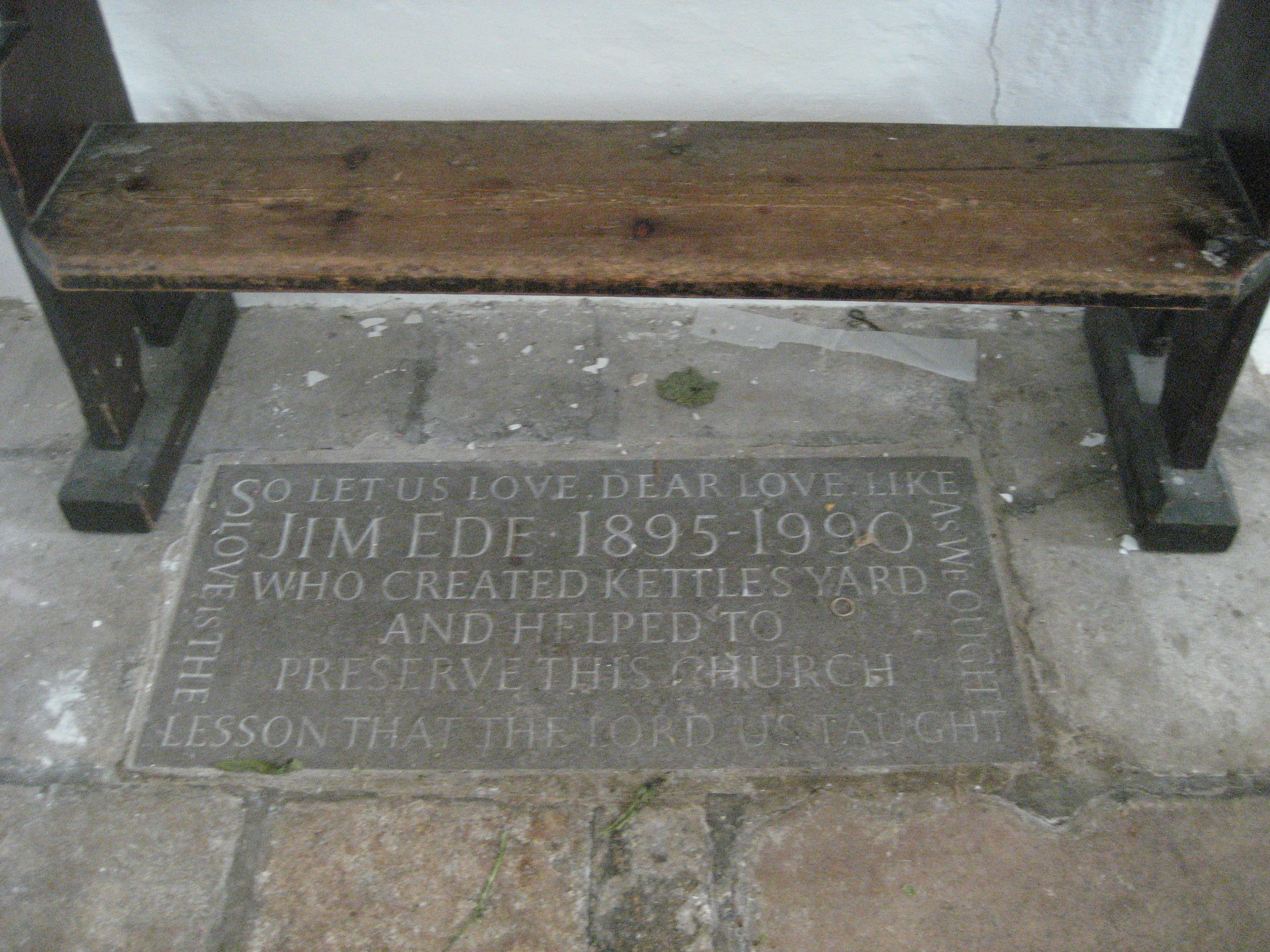
Memorial stone to Jim Ede "who created Kettle's Yard and helped to preserve this church"

== See also ==
- All Saints' Church, Cambridge, also in the care of the CCT
- Ascension Parish Burial Ground, formerly the burial ground for the parish of St Giles and St Peter's
- St Giles' Church, Cambridge
