= List of blue plaques =

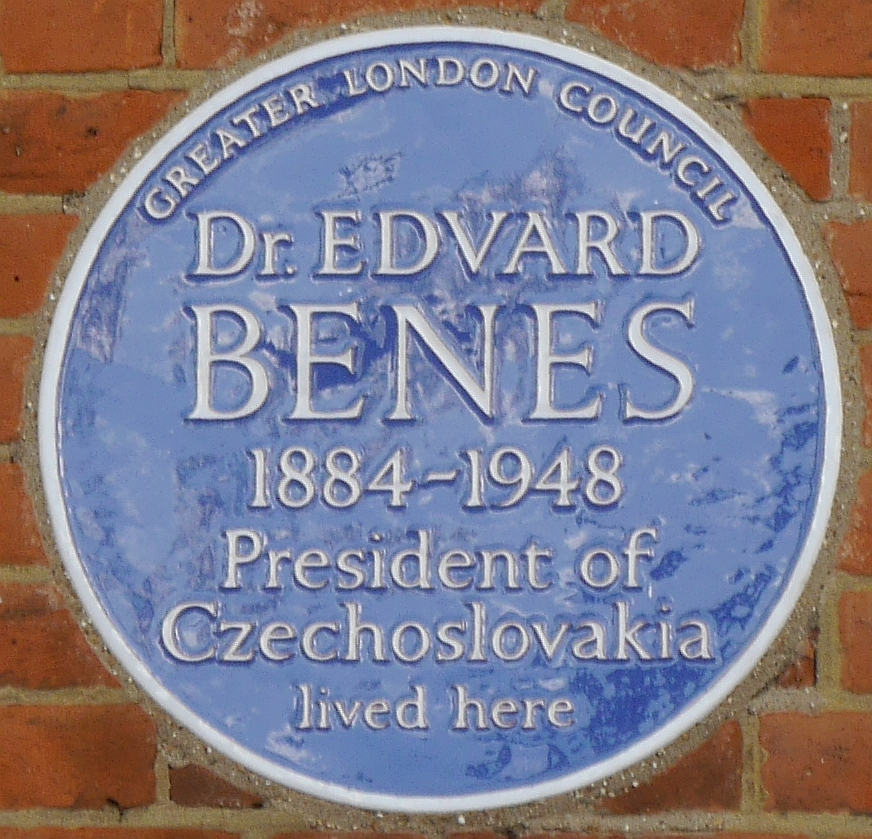
Edvard Beneš blue plaque, 26 Gwendolen Avenue, Putney

This list of blue plaques is an annotated list of people or events in the United Kingdom that have been commemorated by blue plaques. The plaques themselves are permanent signs installed in publicly visible locations on buildings to commemorate either a famous person who lived or worked in the building (or site) or an event that occurred within the building.

== London/English Heritage plaques ==
A list of blue plaques erected by English Heritage or its three predecessors in administering the blue plaque programme: the Society of Arts (1866–1901), the London County Council (1901–1965), and the Greater London Council (1965–1986) is linked above. The entries in the lists in are based on information from the English Heritage website. The erection of plaques was suspended from 1915 to 1919 and 1940 to 1947 due to the two world wars. It was announced in 2013 that the scheme would be indefinitely suspended until 2014 due to a 34% cut in English Heritage's budget, but it was able to continue thanks to private donations.

== Other similar plaques ==
Other plaques erected by local authorities, societies, companies, or private individuals that emulate the style and function of the plaques erected by English Heritage and its predecessors.

=== People ===
Person	Notability	Address	Year erected	Erected by	Photo
Jessie Ace and Margaret Wright (1860–1936) and (1854–1933)	Heroines of Mumbles Lifeboat disaster	Mumbles Pier, Swansea, Wales	2016	City and County of Swansea	
John Addenbrooke (1680–1719)	English medical doctor who founded Addenbrooke's Hospital	Main entrance, Addenbrooke's Hospital, Hills Road, Cambridge		Cambridge City and South Cambridgeshire	
Damon Albarn (born 1968)	Musician	21 Fillebrook Rd, Leytonstone	2014	Waltham Forest Heritage	
Agnes Arber (1879–1960)	Botanist, historian, philosopher	52 Huntingdon Road, Cambridge	2024	Cambridge City and South Cambridgeshire	
Richard Arkwright junior (1755–1843)	Inventor of machinery for large scale cotton spinning	Lumford House; Bakewell, Derbyshire	2011	Derbyshire County Council	
Francis William Aston (1877–1945)	Scientist, Nobel Prize winner in Chemistry 1922	Tennal House; Tennal Road, Birmingham	2007	Birmingham Civic Society	
Wilbert Awdry (1911–1997)	Creator of Thomas the Tank Engine books	Old Rectory, Church Lane, Elsworth	2020	Cambridge City and South Cambridgeshire	
Charles Babbage (1791–1871)	Mathematician, astronomer and computer pioneer	1a Dorset Street, W1		Westminster City Council	
Charles Babbage (1791–1871)	Mathematician, astronomer and computer pioneer	Corner of Larcom Street and Walworth Road, SE17		Southwark Council	
Olave Baden-Powell (1889–1977)	Chief Guide of the Girl Guides	Shentall Memorial Gardens; Chesterfield, Derbyshire	2011	Derbyshire County Council	
Henry Baines (1793–1878)	Botanist and Curator of York Museum Gardens	Manor Cottage, York Museum Gardens, York.	2018	Yorkshire Philosophical Society; York Civic Trust; York Museums Trust	
Syd Barrett (1946 – 2006)	Founder member of Pink Floyd	Inside Anglia Ruskin University, Cambridge	2017	Cambridge City and South Cambridgeshire	
William Barron (1805–1891)	Designer of Elvaston Castle Gardens		2012	Derbyshire County Council	
John Logie Baird (1888–1946)		132-5 Long Acre, WC2		The Royal Television Society	
Mary Barbour (1875–1953)	Scottish social reformer, Rent Strike Leader, Women's Peace Crusader and pioneering woman councillor in Glasgow	10 Hutton Drive, Linthouse, Glasgow	2015	Linthouse Housing Association	
Harry Beck (1903–1974)	Creator of the schematic Tube map	Finchley Central tube station, N3		London Regional Transport (grey)	
Elizabeth Bell (1862–1934)	Physician, Suffragist	Daisy Hill Hospital, Newry, Northern Ireland	2016	Ulster Historical Society (blue)	
A. C. Benson (1862–1925)	Author of Land of Hope & Glory	Godolphin House, Common Lane, Eton College		Royal Borough of Windsor and Maidenhead	
Jack Kid Berg (1909–1991)	Boxer	Noble Court, Cable Street, E1		Stepney Historical Society	
Hannah Billig (1901–1987)	Physician	198 Cable Street, E1		London Borough of Tower Hamlets	
William Bragg (1862–1942)	Scientist, Joint Nobel Prize Winner, 1915, with his son, Sir Lawrence, for Physics	Parkinson Building, University of Leeds			
William Lawrence Bragg (1890–1971)	Scientist, Joint Nobel Prize Winner, 1915, with his father, Sir William (q.v.), for Physics; the only current instance of both father and son Nobel Prize winners	Parkinson Building, University of Leeds			
George Brewster (1863–1875)	The last 'climbing boy' to die in England whose death triggered the Chimney Sweepers Act 1875	Victoria House, Capital Park, Fulbourn	2025	Cambridge City and South Cambridgeshire	
Rupert Brooke (1887 – 1915)	Poet	Orchard House, Mill Way, Grantchester		Cambridge City and South Cambridgeshire	
Archie Scott Brown (1927–1958)	British racing driver	163 Hills Road, Cambridge		Cambridge City and South Cambridgeshire	
Enid Blyton (1897–1968)	Writer	83 Shortlands Road, Shortlands, BR2		London Borough of Bromley (blue)	
Robert Boothby, Baron Boothby (1900–1986)	Private secretary to Winston Churchill	1 Eaton Square, SW1		Private	
Harold Bride (1890–1956)	Wireless operator aboard the RMS Titanic	58 Ravensbourne Avenue, Shortlands, Bromley		London Borough of Bromley (blue)	
Anne Brontë (1820–1849)	Writer	Grand Hotel, Scarborough, North Yorkshire		Scarborough and District Civic Society	
Thomas Boulton and Fredrick Park (1847–1904) and (1846–1881)	Cross-dressers	13 Wakefield Street, Kings Cross, London		Marchmont Association	
Frances Bush (1845–1909)	Lace Manufacturer	99 Nottingham Rd, Long Eaton, Derbyshire	2013	Derbyshire County Council	
Jedediah Buxton (1707–1772)	Mental calculator	Elmton, Derbyshire	2011	Derbyshire County Council	
Everard Calthrop (1857–1927)	Railway engineer	"Goldings", Clays Lane, Loughton, Essex	2008	Loughton Town Council	
Malcolm Campbell (1885–1948)	Racing motorist, Journalist	Bonchester, Bonchester Close, Off Camden Park Road, Chislehurst		London Borough of Bromley (blue)	
Richard Carr-Gomm (1922–2008)	Humanitarian, founder of the Abbeyfield and Carr-Gomm Societies	36 Gomm Road, Bermondsey		Southwark Council	
Charlie Chaplin (1889–1977)	Actor, film maker	39 Methley Street, Kennington, London; 287 Kennington Road, London, SE 11		The Dead Comics Society (blue)	
J. A. Chatwin (1830–1907)	Architect	Lloyds Bank, Queen Square, Wolverhampton		Wolverhampton Civic Society/Lloyds Bank	
Clementine Churchill (1885–1977)	Wife of Winston Churchill	107 High Street, Berkhamsted, Hertfordshire		Berkhamsted Town Council, 1979	
Alvin Langdon Coburn (1882–1966)	Pioneering photographer	Ffordd Isaf, Harlech, Gwynedd, Wales		Royal Photographic Society/Olympus Corporation (blue/octagonal)	
Henry Cooper OBE KSG (1934–2011)	Professional Boxer. British, Commonwealth & European Heavyweight Champion.	4 Ealing Road Wembley HA0 4TL	2018	The Heritage Foundation	
Arthur C. Clarke (1917–2008)	Writer	Blenheim Road, Minehead, Somerset	2001	Minehead Town Council (blue)	
William Sands Cox (1802–1875)	Surgeon	House of Fraser store, Temple Row, Birmingham		City of Birmingham (blue)	
Thomas Crapper (1837–1910)	Plumber and engineer	12 Thornsett Road, Bromley		London Borough of Bromley (blue)	
Richmal Crompton (1890–1969)	Author	'The Glebe', Oakley Road, Bromley Common, BR2		London Borough of Bromley (green)	
Oliver Cromwell (1599–1658)	English military and political leader	Market Passage, Cambridge		Cambridge City and South Cambridgeshire	
Dr.James Deeny (1906–1994)	Public Health Pioneer	21, Church Place, Lurgan	2012	Ulster History Circle	
Sebastian de Ferranti (1864–1930)	Electrical Engineer	Havelock Building, 130 Bold Street, Liverpool L1 4JA (birthplace)	2016	Liverpool Council	
Walter de la Mare (1873–1956)	Writer	14 Thornsett Road, Anerley, SE20		London Borough of Bromley	
Bernard Delfont (as Baron Delfont) (1909–1994)	Impresario	Prince of Wales Theatre, Coventry Street, SW1		Comic Heritage	
Grantly Dick-Read (1890–1959)	Obstetrician	25 Harley Street, W1		Westminster City Council/National Childbirth Trust (green)	
Robert William Dale (1829–1895)	Nonconformist church leader	Carrs Lane Church, Birmingham		Birmingham Civic Society	
Ann Docwra (1624–1710)	Quaker minister	12 Jesus Lane, Cambridge		Cambridge City and South Cambridgeshire	
Edward Mortlock Donaldson (1912–1992)	Flight airspeed record holder	Park Lane, Selsey, West Sussex; 86, Grafton Road, Selsey, West Sussex		West Sussex County Council	
Diana Dors (1931–1984)	Actress and singer	61 & 62 Kent Road, Swindon, SN1	2016	Swindon Heritage	
Arthur Conan Doyle (1859–1930)	Writer	2 Upper Wimpole Street, W1		Westminster City Council/The Arthur Conan Doyle Society (green)	
Jim Ede (1895–1990)	British art collector	Kettle’s Yard, Castle Street, Cambridge		Cambridge City and South Cambridgeshire	
George Elkington (1801–1865)	Promoter of electro-plating	Museum of Science and Industry, Newhall Street, Birmingham B3			
Arthur English (1919–1995)	Actor and comedian	22 Lysons Road; Aldershot, Hampshire	2017	Aldershot Civic Society	
Geraint Evans (1922–1992)	Opera singer	34 Birchwood Road, Petts Wood, BR5		London Borough of Bromley	
Mary Farmer (1940–2021)	Textile and tapestry artist, Course Director at Royal College of Art	50 High Street, Boston, Lincolnshire, PE21 8SP	2024	Boston Preservation Trust	
Henry Fawcett (1833–1884)	British academic, statesman and economist	19 Brookside, Cambridge		Cambridge City and South Cambridgeshire	
Millicent Garrett Fawcett (1847–1929)	English politician, writer, and activist	19 Brookside, Cambridge	2018	Cambridge City and South Cambridgeshire	
Humphrey Gainsborough (1718–1776)	Non-conformist minister, engineer and inventor	Christ Church United Reformed Church, Reading Road, Henley-on-Thames		Oxfordshire Blue Plaques Board/Oxford Civic Society	
Sampson Gamgee (1828–1886)	Surgeon	Repertory Theatre, Centenary Square, Broad Street, Birmingham		Birmingham Civic Society	
Robert Graves (1895–1985)	English Poet	Vale House, Manor Vale Road, Galmpton, Brixham		Torbay Civic Society	
Graham Greene (1904–1991)	Writer	St John's Boarding House, Chesham Road, Berkhamsted, Hertfordshire		Berkhamsted Town Council	
Nigel Gresley (1876–1941)	Railway engineer	Old Rectory, Ashby Road, Netherseal	2013	Derbyshire County Council	
Pete Ham (1947–1975)	Rock musician, member of The Iveys and Badfinger	Swansea Railway Station, High Street, Swansea, SA1 1NU	2013	City and County of Swansea	
Tony Hancock (1924–1968)	Actor and comedian	10 Grey Close, NW11		The Dead Comics Society	
James Harrington (1611–1677)	Author of The Commonwealth of Oceana	Manor House, Rectory Lane, Milton Malsor; Northamptonshire, NN7 3AQ		Milton Malsor Historical Society	
John Hartle (1933–1968)	British motorcycle racer	New Inn, 1 Manchester Road, Chapel-en-le-Frith; Cheshire, SK23 9SR	2010	Derbyshire Blue Plaques	
Benjamin Waterhouse Hawkins (1807–1889)	Sculptor and artist	'Fossil Villa', 22 Belvedere Road, Anerley		London Borough of Bromley (black)	
Ethel Haythornthwaite (1894–1986)	Environmental campaigner and pioneer	Endcliffe Student Village (formerly Endcliffe Vale House), University of Sheffield	2022	CPRE PDSY and University of Sheffield	Haythornthwaite's blue plaque at Endcliffe Student Village
Mary Frances Heaton (1801–1878)	Music teacher, unjustly incarcerated as mentally ill		2020	Wakefield	
Oliver Heaviside (1850–1925)	Electrical engineer and mathematician	Homefield, Lower Warberry Road, TQ1		The Institution of Electrical Engineers	
John Stevens Henslow (1796–1861)	British botanist, geologist, and priest	Cambridge Botanic Garden, Brookside, Cambridge		Cambridge City and South Cambridgeshire	
Edward Heron-Allen (1861–1943)	Lawyer, Writer, Scholar, Scientist	122 High Street Selsey; West Sussex, PO20 0QE		West Sussex County Council	
Allen Hill (1937–2021)	Chemist	Inorganic Chemistry Laboratory, Oxford OX1 3QR	2012	Royal Society of Chemistry (Blue hexagon)	
William & Avis Hope	Location of Bob Hope's Mother's childhood house, Avis Townes, who was a former Opera Singer.	12 Greenwood St, Barry	1984	Bob Hope	
Gerard Manley Hopkins (1844–1889)	Poet	Manresa House, Roehampton		Greater London Council	
Jack Hobbs (1882–1963)	English cricketer	Hobbs Pavilion, Parker’s Piece, Cambridge		Cambridge City and South Cambridgeshire	
Thomas Hobson (1544–1631)	English carrier	52–54 St Andrew's Street, Cambridge		Cambridge City and South Cambridgeshire	
Frank Hornby (1863–1836)	Toy manufacturer (Meccano Ltd) and MP.	The Hollies, Station road, Maghull, Liverpool L31 3DB		English Heritage	
Fred Hoyle (1915–2001)	English astronomer	Ivy Lodge, 7 Linton Road, Great Abington	2022	Cambridge City and South Cambridgeshire	
Charles Humfrey (1772–1848)	Architect, developer, banker and mayor	Maid's Causeway, Newmarket Road, Cambridge; On the side of 1 Fair Street		Cambridge City and South Cambridgeshire	
William Hutton (1723–1815)	Historian	Waterstones, High Street, Birmingham		Birmingham Civic Society	
Barry Jackson (director) (1879–1961)	English theatre director, entrepreneur and the founder of the Birmingham Repertory Theatre	Old Rep, Station Street, Birmingham, B5 4DY		Birmingham Civic Society	
Sid James (1913–1976)	Actor	Gunnersbury Avenue, London		The Dead Comics Society	
Derek Jarman (1942–1994)	Film-maker, artist and gay rights activist	Butler's Wharf Building, 36 Shad Thames, SE1 2YE	2019		
Eglantyne Jebb (1876–1928)	British social reformer, founder of Save the Children	82 Regent Street, Cambridge		Cambridge City and South Cambridgeshire	
Griffith John (1831–1912)	Christian missionary and translator	Ebenezer Chapel, Ebenezer Street, Swansea, SA1 5BJ	2013	City and County of Swansea	
Samuel Johnson & Joshua Reynolds (1709–1784) and (1723–1792)	Founders of The Club	9 Gerrard Street, W1		Westminster City Council/Honsway C&E Foundation (green)	
Charles Keeping (1924–1988)	Illustrator	16 Church Road, Shortlands, BR2		London Borough of Bromley	
Marie Kendall (1873–1964)	Music Hall Artiste	Okeover Manor; Clapham Common Northside, London	2011		
John F. Kennedy (1917–1963)	Politician and US President	14 Princes Gate, London SW7		Unknown	
Albert Ketèlbey (1875–1959)	Composer and musician	Birmingham and Midland Institute, Cornwall Street, Birmingham	2002	Birmingham Civic Society	
John Maynard Keynes (1883–1946)	British economist	6 St Edward's Passage, Cambridge		Cambridge City and South Cambridgeshire	
Hetty King (1883–1972)	Music Hall artistes and male impersonator	17 Palmerston Road, Wimbledon		Erected by The Music Hall Guild of Great Britain and America.	
Frederick W. Lanchester (1868–1946)	Scientist, inventor and engineer	Oxford Road, Moseley, Birmingham		Unknown (green)	
George Herbert Lawrence (1888–1940)	Industrialist	Main Street, Hathersage, Derbyshire	2013	Derbyshire County Council	
Louis Leakey (1903–1972)	Palaeoanthropologist	13 High Street, Foxton, Cambridgeshire	2025	Cambridge City and South Cambridgeshire	
Leah Manning (1886–1977)	British educationalist, social reformer and Labour Member of Parliament	Young Street, Cambridge	2020	Cambridge City and South Cambridgeshire	
Jessie Matthews (1907–1981)	Actress, dancer and singer	Blue Posts Pub, 22 Berwick Street, W1		Westminster City Council	
John Le Mesurier (1912–1983)	Actor	Baron's Court, London		The Dead Comics Society	
Edward Lear (1812–1888)	Painter, poet and humorist	30 Seymour Street, Westminster, W1		Westminster City Council Plaque removed in 2012.	
Edward Lear (1812–1888)	Painter, poet and humorist	15 Stratford Place, Westminster, W1		Westminster City Council (green)	
Edward Lear (1812–1888)	Painter, poet and humorist	Bowman's Mews, N7		London Borough of Islington	
Agnes Smith Lewis and Margaret Dunlop Gibson (1843–1926) and (1843–1920)	Twin sisters and biblical scholars	Westminster College (entrance gate), Madingley Road, Cambridge	2019	Cambridge City and South Cambridgeshire	
Lloyds Bank (Sampson Lloyd) (1699–1779)	Origin of bank	Dale End, Birmingham		City of Birmingham	
Oliver Joseph Lodge (1851–1940)	Discoverer of wireless telegraphy and inventor of the spark plug	Wolstanton, Newcastle-under-Lyme, Staffordshire	2007	Newcastle-under-Lyme Civic Society	
Arthur Lowe (1915–1982)	Actor	Kinder Road; Hayfield, Derbyshire	2011	Derbyshire County Council	
John Lubbock, 1st Baron Avebury (1834–1913)	Banker, politician, naturalist and archaeologist	High Elms Estate, Shire Lane, Farnborough, BR6		London Borough of Bromley	
Ewan MacColl (1915–1989)	Singer, songwriter and political activist	35 Stanley Avenue, Beckenham, BR3		London Borough of Bromley	
James Joseph Magennis (1919–1986)	Submariner and Victoria Cross recipient	Royal Naval Association building, Great Victoria Street, Belfast		Ulster History Circle	
David Gregory Marshall (1873–1942)	University caterer, early pioneer of motoring and flying. Founder of Marshall of Cambridge	18 Jesus Lane, Cambridge		Cambridge City and South Cambridgeshire	
(Lord) Mayors of Birmingham of the Martineau family	Birmingham Council House foyer 1 Victoria Square B1	2008		Birmingham Civic Society	
Karl Marx (1818–1883)	Philosopher, political economist, and revolutionary	101-8 Maitland Park Road, NW3		Camden London Borough Council (claret)	
James McBey (1883–1959)	Artist	1 Holland Park Avenue, London W11		Unknown (grey)	
Joe Meek (1929–1967)	Record producer and pioneer of sound recording technology was born here	1 Market Square; Newent, Gloucestershire		Unknown (black) as shown, replaced with The Heritage Foundation in 2011	
Joe Meek (1929–1967)	Record producer – The Telstar man, pioneer of sound recording technology, lived, worked and died here.	304 Holloway Road, N19		Unknown (black)	
John Everett Millais (1829–1896)	Painter	The Octagon; Budleigh Salterton, Devon		Unknown	
Spike Milligan (1918–2002)	Comedian	Camden Palace, Camden High Street, NW1		Comic Heritage	
Keith Moon (1946–1978)	Drummer with The Who	90 Wardour Street, Soho, London W1; Site of the Marquee Club	2009		
Terry Moores (1949–2014)	Ceramic sculptor and potter	50 High Street, Boston, Lincolnshire, PE21 8SP	2024	Boston Preservation Trust	
Henry Morris (1889–1961)	Founder of Village Colleges	4 Silver Street, Cambridge		Cambridge City and South Cambridgeshire	
Richarda Morrow-Tait (1923–1982)	Pilot and adventurer	St Regis Flats, Clare College, Chesterton Road, Cambridge	2024	Cambridge City and South Cambridgeshire	
John Mortlock (1755–1816)	British banker	10 Peas Hill, Cambridge		Cambridge City and South Cambridgeshire	
Gladys Moss (1919–1941)	First Woman Police Officer in West Sussex	Worthing Police Station Chatsworth Road Worthing BN11 1LY	2015		
Wolfgang Amadeus Mozart (1756–1791)	Composer	20 Frith Street, W1		Royal Music Association	
James Murray (1837–1915)	Lexicographer	78 Banbury Road, Oxford		Oxfordshire Blue Plaques Board/Oxford Civic Society	
Heddle Nash (1895–1961)	Opera singer	49 Towncourt Crescent, Petts Wood, Bromley		London Borough of Bromley (black)	
Edith New (1877–1951)	Suffragette	Kent Road, Swindon SN1	2016	Swindon Heritage	
J. A. R. Newlands (1837–1898)	Chemist	West Square, London, SE11		Royal Society of Chemistry	
Florence Nightingale (1820–1910)	Social reformer		2014	Derbyshire County Council	
Seán O'Casey (1880–1964)	Dramatist	Ashburton Road, Totnes, Devon		Unknown (stone)	
Joe Orton (1933–1967)	Playwright	25 Noel Road, London, N1		London Borough of Islington (green)	
Alexander Parkes (1813–1890)	Metallurgist and inventor	Museum of Science and Industry, Birmingham		Birmingham Civic Society	
Joseph Paxton (1803–1865)	Gardener, architect of The Crystal Palace, MP	Chatsworth Estate, Derbyshire	2011	Derbyshire County Council	
William Perkin (1838–1907)	Chemist	Cable Street, E1		Stepney Historical Trust	
Stephen Perse (1548–1615)	Educator	Free School Lane, Cambridge		Cambridge City and South Cambridgeshire	
John Phillips (1800–1874)	Geologist and first Keeper of the Yorkshire Museum	St. Mary's Lodge, York Museum Gardens, York	2016	Yorkshire Philosophical Society, York Civic Trust, and York Museums Trust	
Enid Porter (1909 – 1984)	Curator of the Cambridge & County Folk museum	1 Northampton Street, Cambridge		Cambridge City and South Cambridgeshire	
Anthony Powell	English novelist best known for his 12-volume work, A Dance to the Music of Time.	1 Chester Gate London NW1	16 September 2023	Anthony Powell Society	
Anthony E. Pratt (1903 – 1994)	Inventor of Cluedo	9 Stanley Road, Kings Heath, Birmingham	2013		
Joseph Priestley (1733–1804)	Scholar, scientist, theologian and discoverer of oxygen	Church of St Michael and St Joseph, New Meeting House Lane, Birmingham		Birmingham Civic Society	
Clara Rackham (1875–1966)	English feminist and politician			Cambridge City and South Cambridgeshire	
Gwen Raverat (1885–1957)	Artist	Darwin College, Silver Street, Cambridge		Cambridge City and South Cambridgeshire	
Dorothy Rees 1898 – 1987	MP and Social Reformer	6 Newland Street, Barry		Vale of Glamorgan Council	
Elizabeth Jesser Reid (1789–1866)	Slavery abolitionist and founder of Bedford College for Women	48 Bedford Square, WC1		Unknown (green)	
George Arthur Roberts (1890–1970)	First World War soldier, Second World War fireman, West Indian Community Leader	Lewis Trust Dwellings, Warner Road, Camberwell	2016	London Borough of Southwark	
Joan Robinson (1903–1983)	Economist	Kensington Park Gardens, London	2024	English Heritage	
W. Heath Robinson (1872–1944)	Cartoonist and Illustrator	75 Moss Lane; Pinner, Harrow	1976	unknown	
Henry Royce (1863–1933)	Co-founder of Rolls-Royce	Quarndon House, Derby	2012	Derbyshire County Council	
Willie Rushton (1937–1996)	Satirist	Mornington Crescent tube station, NW1		Comic Heritage	
Bertrand Russell (1872–1970)	British philosopher, logician and mathematician	Babraham Road, Cambridge	2025	Cambridge City and South Cambridgeshire	
Rex C. Russell (1951–2014)	Historian, author and lecturer	Priestgate, Barton-upon-Humber	2015	Barton Civic Society	
Bertha Ryland (1882–1977)	Suffragette	Birmingham Museum and Art Gallery	2018	Birmingham Civic Society	
Terry Scott (1927–1994)	Actor and comedian	32 Tucker Street, Watford		Comic Heritage	
Peter Sellers (1925–1980)	Actor and comedian	10 Muswell Hill Road, N6		The Dead Comics Society	
Eileen Sheridan (1923–2023)	Cyclist	Butts Park Arena, Coventry	2024	Coventry Cycling Club The Coventry Society	
Samuel Slater (1768–1835)	Father of the American Industrial Revolution	Sunnymount Cottage, Chevin Road, Belper	2012	Derbyshire County Council	
Small Faces and Don Arden (1926–2007)	1960s mod group and manager	52–55 Carnaby Street, London		Westminster City Council (green)	
John Smedley (1803–1874)	Father of the American Industrial Revolution	County Hall, Smedley Street, Matlock, Derbyshire	2012	Derbyshire County Council	
Charles Villiers Stanford (1852–1924))	Irish composer, music teacher, and conductor	10 Harvey Road, Cambridge		Cambridge City and South Cambridgeshire	
Ziggy Stardust	The location where the cover of David Bowie's album was photographed. Unveiled by Gary Kemp	23 Heddon Street, London	2012		
William Thomas Stead (1849–1912)	Journalist	5 Smith Square, London		Westminster City Council	
George Stephenson (1781–1848)	Civil engineer	Chesterfield railway station, Derbyshire	2011	Derbyshire County Council	
George Herbert Strutt (1854–1928)	Mill owner, Philanthropist	Makeney Hall, Belper, Derbyshire	2013	Derbyshire County Council	
Joseph Sturge (1793–1859)	Quaker, campaigner for peace, extension of the vote and abolition of slavery	Eden Croft, Wheeleys Road, Edgbaston, Birmingham		Birmingham Civic Society	
Thomas Telford (1757–1834)	Civil Engineer	Towyn Lodge, Ravenspoint Road, Trearddur Bay, Anglesey	2016	BAe Systems	
William Terriss (1847–1897)	Actor	Beside the stage door of the Adelphi Theatre in London	1971	Westminster City Council (green)	
Dylan Thomas (1914–1953)	Writer	5 Cwmdonkin Drive, Uplands, Swansea, SA2 0RA			
Bertram Thomas (1892–1950)	Diplomat and explorer	Avon Villa, Springfield Road, Pill, Somerset, BS20 0DP	1986	Crockerne Pill and District History Society	
Harry Relph – "Little Tich" (1867–1928)	Music hall comedian	The Blacksmith Arms, Cudham, Bromley		London Borough of Bromley	
J. R. R. Tolkien (1892–1973)	Writer	Sarehole Mill; Hall Green, Birmingham		Birmingham Civic Society and The Tolkien Society	
J. R. R. Tolkien (1892–1973)	Writer	1 Duchess Place; Edgbaston, Birmingham		Birmingham Civic Society	
J. R. R. Tolkien (1892–1973)	Writer	4 Highfield Road; Edgbaston, Birmingham		Birmingham Civic Society and The Tolkien Society	
J. R. R. Tolkien (1892–1973)	Writer	Plough and Harrow, Hagley Road; Edgbaston, Birmingham		The Tolkien Society	
J. R. R. Tolkien (1892–1973)	Writer	20 Northmoor Road; Oxford		Oxfordshire Blue Plaques Board	
P. L. Travers (1899–1996)	Author of Mary Poppins	50 Smith Street, London SW3			
Alan Turing (1912–1954)	English computer scientist	58 Trumpington Street, Cambridge		Cambridge City and South Cambridgeshire	
Edward Turner (1901–1973)	Motorcycle designer	8, Philip Walk, Peckham SE15		Southwark Council	
William Turner (1789–1862)	Artist	16 St John Street, Oxford		Oxford Civic Society	
Alison Uttley (1884–1976)	Author	Castle Top Farm, Cromford, Derbyshire	2012	Derbyshire County Council	
Barnes Wallis (1887–1979)	Pioneer of aircraft design and inventor of the Bouncing Bomb	241 New Cross Road, New Cross, London, SE14		Lewisham Council (scarlet)	
Sam Wanamaker (1919–1993)	Visionary who recreated Shakespeare's Globe	Bankside, SE1		Southwark Council	
Baron Dickinson Webster (1818–1860)	Wire manufacturer	Penns Hall, Birmingham; 52.536484°N 1.808112°W		Sutton Coldfield Civic Society	
H. G. Wells (1866–1946)	Writer	Chiltern Court, Baker Street, NW1		The H. G. Wells Society (scarlet)	
H. G. Wells (1866–1946)	Writer	Primark Store, Market Place, Bromley, BR1		Unknown	
Elsie Widdowson (1906–2000)	British nutritionist	55 High Street, Barrington	2021	Cambridge City and South Cambridgeshire	
William Wilkins (1778–1839)	English architect and archaeologist	44 Lensfield Road, Cambridge		Cambridge City and South Cambridgeshire	
William Willett (1856–1915)	Campaigner for daylight saving time	The Cedars, Camden Park Road, Chislehurst		London Borough of Bromley	
Kenneth Williams (1926–1988)	Comedy actor	57 Marchmont Street, WC1		The Heritage Foundation	
Henry Williamson (1895–1977)	Author	Crowberry Cottage, Georgeham, Devon, and Skirr Cottage in Georgeham		The Henry Williamson Society	
Ted Willis, Baron Willis (1918–1992)	Playwright	5 Shepherds Green, Chislehurst, BR7		London Borough of Bromley	
Ludwig Wittgenstein (1889–1951)	Austrian philosopher and logician	76 Storey's Way, Cambridge		Cambridge City and South Cambridgeshire	
Frank Whittle (1907–1996)	British Royal Air Force engineer and air officer	Cambridge University Engineering Department, Trumpington St, Cambridge		Cambridge City and South Cambridgeshire	
Joseph Whitworth (1803–1887)	Engineer, Inventor	Amber Mill, Oakerthorpe, Derbyshire	2012	Derbyshire County Council	
James Wolfe (1727–1759)	Victor of the Battle of the Plains of Abraham in Quebec 1759	5 Trim Street, Bath		unknown - bronze rectangle	
Ken Wood (1916–1997)	Entrepreneur and businessman, inventor of the eponymous Kenwood Chef food mixer.	Goldsworth Road, Woking, Surrey	2017	Woking Borough Council	

=== Places, organisations, or other ===
Organisation, place, or event	Description	Location	Year erected	Erected by	Colour	Image
Basque Refugees	29 Basque children, refugees from the Spanish Civil War, were cared for by in a house provided by Jesus College	1 Salisbury Villas, Cambridge, CB1 2JF	2005 War Memorials Register No. 65794	Cambridge City and South Cambridgeshire	Blue	
Cambridge Mayoralty	Cambridge was granted the right to appoint a mayor or reeve of their choice by royal charter of King John, on 8th May 1207.	The Guildhall, 318 Market Hill, Cambridge, CB2 3AD		Cambridge City and South Cambridgeshire	Blue	
Cambridge Philosophical Society	Scientific society, founded in 1819	2, All Saint's Passage, Cambridge		Cambridge City and South Cambridgeshire	Blue	
The Clink	Notorious prison in Southwark	Clink Street, London SE1		London Borough of Southwark	Blue	
DNA	"The Secret of Life" discovered 28th February 1953	The Eagle Pub, Bene't Street, Cambridge	2023 (replacing the 2003 version)	Cambridge City and South Cambridgeshire	Blue	
Girton College & Founders	Established in 1869 as Britain’s first residential institution for the higher education of women	Girton College, Cambridge, CB3 0JG	2019	Cambridge City and South Cambridgeshire	Blue	
EDSAC Computer	The first electronic computer to go into general use that did not need to be rewired by hand for every new task - marking the birth of everyday computing	David Attenborough Building, University of Cambridge, Cambridge, UK	2026	Cambridge Past, Present & Future	Blue	
The Gramophone Company	Europe's first disc recording studio. Established by Fred Gaisberg and The Gramophone Company in 1898	31 Maiden Lane, London WC2	2019	Westminster City Council	Green	
Hughes Hall	Graduate college of Cambridge University, was founded in Crofton Cottages in 1885.	1–3 Merton Street, Cambridge, CB3 9JD	2011	Cambridge City and South Cambridgeshire	Blue	
New Hall	Women's college of Cambridge University, founded in Silver Street in 1954	Silver Street, Cambridge		Cambridge City and South Cambridgeshire	Blue	
North Sea flood of 1953	Marking the level of flood water	Leigh Heritage Centre, 13A High St, Leigh-on-Sea, Essex, SS9		The Leigh Society	Blue	
Live at Leeds	Site of legendary live recording by The Who	The University of Leeds Refectory, Leeds, West Yorkshire	2006	Leeds Civic Trust	Blue	
Royal Air Force	Site of first headquarters	80 Strand, London WC2	2008	Westminster City Council	Green	
J Van Smirren Ltd	Historic listed warehouse used by the Seafood Canning Company.	50 High Street, Boston, Lincolnshire, PE21 8SP	2024	Boston Preservation Trust	Blue	
White Horse Inn "Birthplace of the Reformation"	Site of the White Horse Inn, also known as 'Little Germany', where Cambridge scholars debated the works of Martin Luther in the early sixteenth century	King's Parade Trumpington Street boundary		Cambridge City and South Cambridgeshire	Blue	

== See also ==
- List of blue plaques erected by the Royal Society of Chemistry
- List of hoax commemorative plaques
