= Victoria Road, Cambridge =

Road in Cambridge, England

Coordinates: 52°12′56″N 0°07′01″E

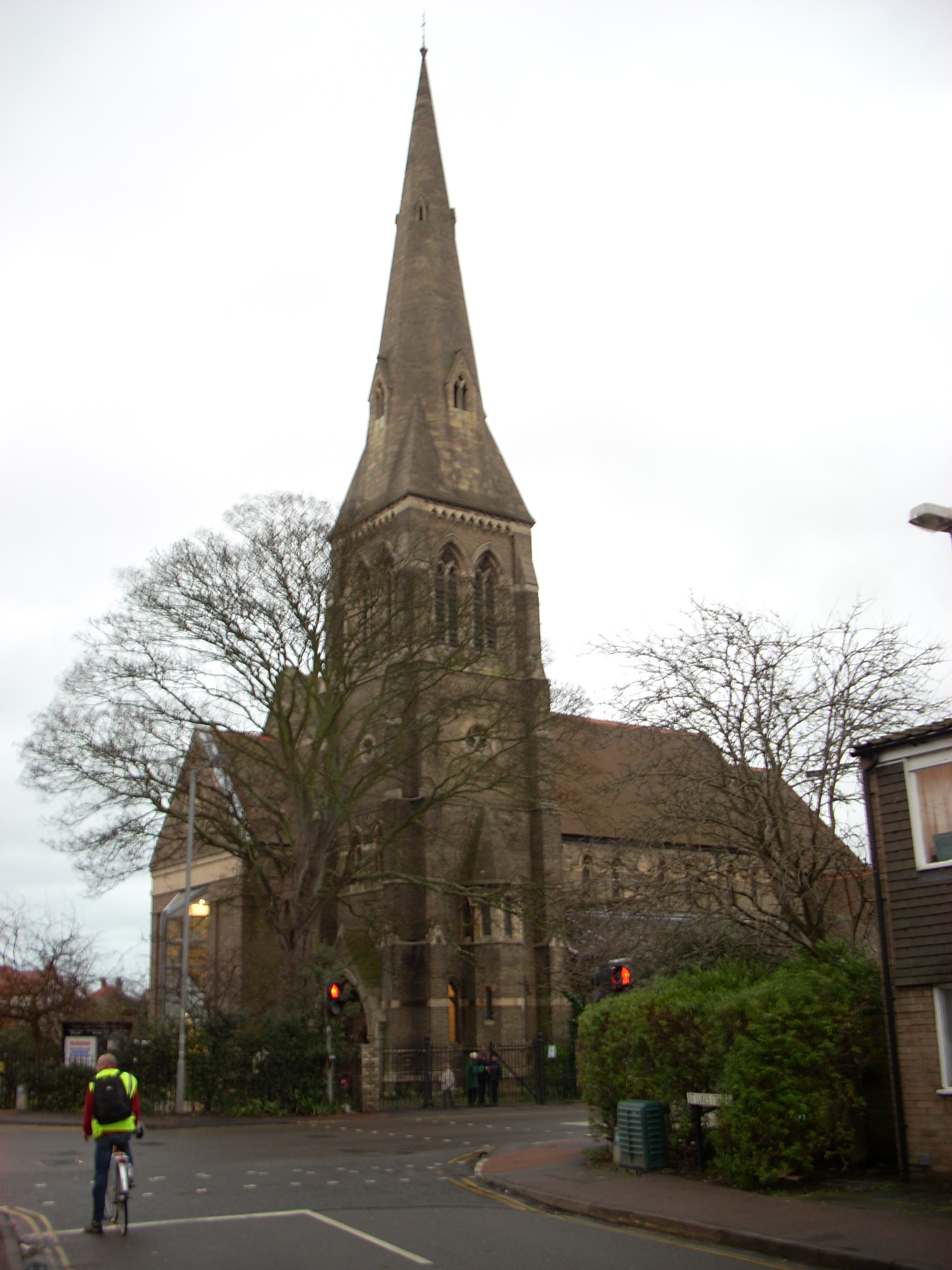
St Luke's Church, on Victoria Road.

Victoria Road is a residential road in the north of Cambridge, England. The road is designated the A1134. At the western end, the road links with Histon Road (B1049, leading north out of Cambridge towards the large village of Histon, on the other side of the A14), Huntingdon Road (A1307, leading northwest out of the city to link with the M11 motorway), Mount Pleasant, and Castle Street.In 1950, there were plans to improve this junction, but they never came to fruition. At the eastern end it links with Chesterton Road (A1303) and also links to Milton Road, the A1134, then A1309, northeast out of the city, also linking with the A14.

St Luke's Church is on the north side of road. St Luke's is a Victorian building. The church community has been enlarged by combining the United Reformed Church and the Church of England congregations as a Local Ecumenical Partnership. The building has been renovated extensively during the last 15 years and includes four rooms available for use by the local community as well as the church itself.

== See also ==
- List of places named after Victoria of the United Kingdom
