= Histon Road =

Road in Cambridge, England

Coordinates: 52°13′02″N 0°06′40″E

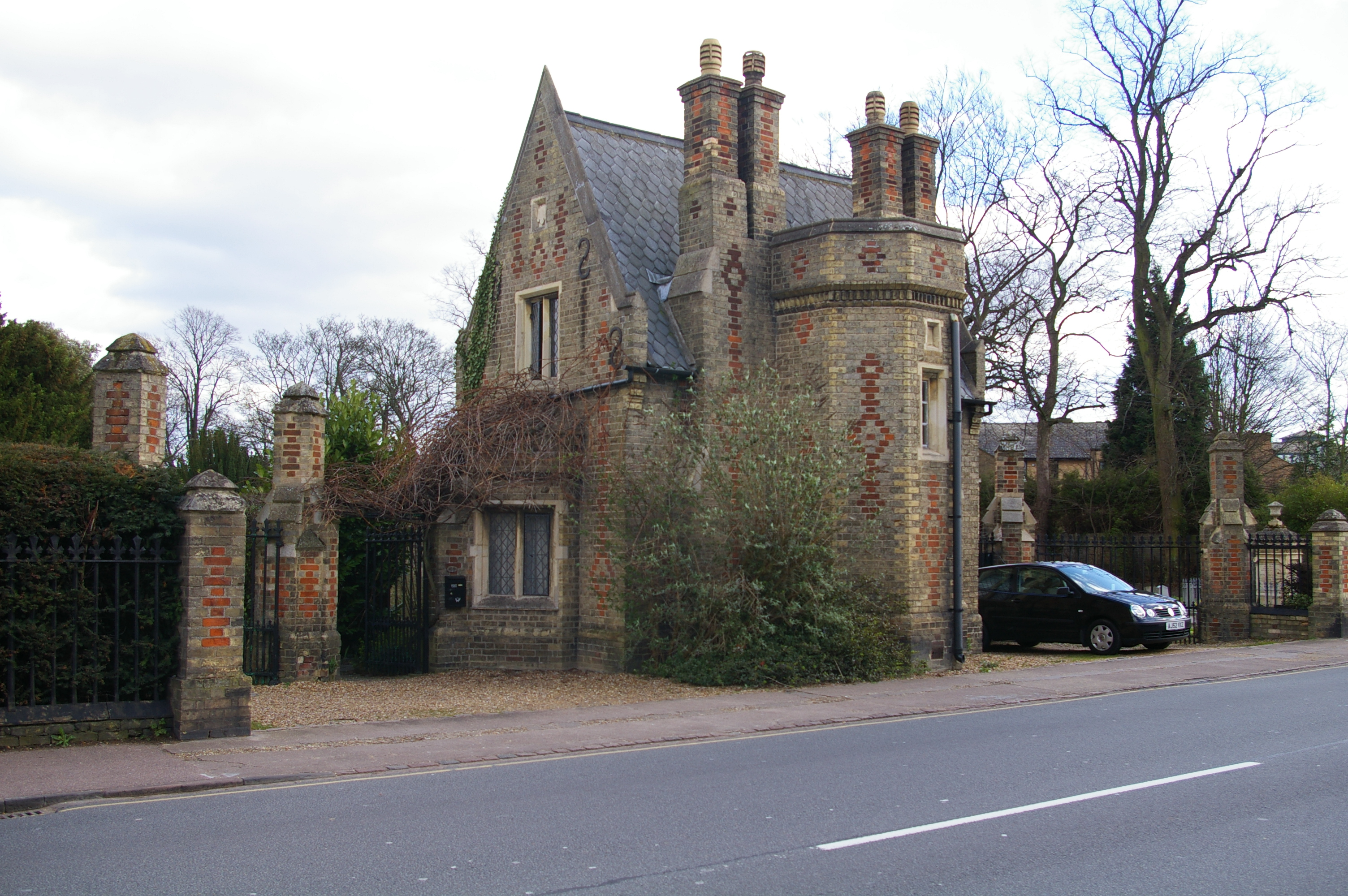
Lodge and entrance at Histon Road Cemetery, on Histon Road.

Histon Road is an arterial road linking central Cambridge, England with the A14 road north of the city. The road is designated the B1049. At the southern end, the road links with Huntingdon Road (A1307), Victoria Road (A1134), Mount Pleasant, and Castle Street. At the northern end of the road it continues just south of the A14 as Cambridge road into the village of Impington.

Much of the housing on the road dates from the 1930s. For example, Langham House, a block of flats, is typical of the era.

Near the southern end to the west is the Histon Road Recreation Ground. On the opposite side of the road to the East was Simons House, a retirement home. It was built in 1977 to a design by the architects Darbourne & Darke, and demolished in 2009 to make way for senior citizens' flats.

Just south of the junction with King's Hedges Road to the east near the northern end are the Histon Road Allotments. On the west side of the road is Impington Farm.

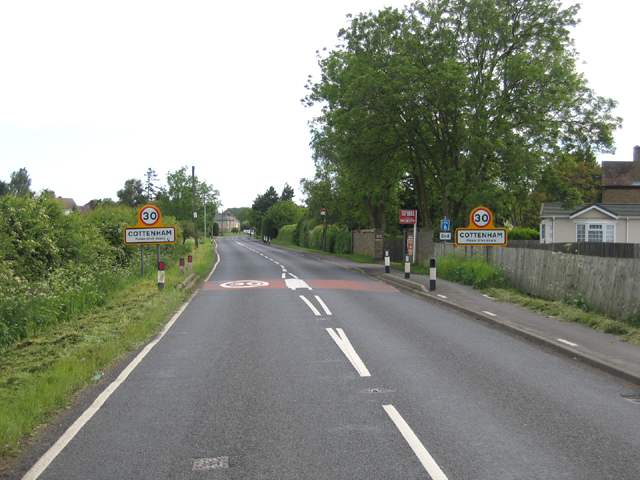
The entrance to the village of Cottenham on the B1049 road, also known as Histon Road at this point.

North of Histon and south of the village of Cottenham, the B1049 is also known as Histon Road.

== See also ==
- Histon, a village in Cambridgeshire, north of Cambridge
- Histon Road Cemetery
