= Arthur Randell =

Arthur Redvers Randell (11 July 1901 – 26 March 1988) wrote about life in the English Fens.

== Biography ==
Randell was born near the River Great Ouse at Wiggenhall St Mary Magdalen, Norfolk, in the United Kingdom. During his early life he made a living from being a railway worker for Great Eastern Railway, LNER and British Rail and a molecatcher, the fourth generation in his family. He worked on the railways for 47 years mostly at Waldersea siding signal box. After retiring in 1965 he worked as a mole-catcher for the Hundreds of Wisbech Internal Drainage Board and the Laddus Drove Drainage Board. In 1968 he went to work as a pest controller on the Coldham Hall estate.

He was a great authority on The Fens and its people and customs. He wrote about the blacksmith who was forced to turn to repairing farm implements and kitchen implements, the chimney sweep, the harness maker, the pig-killer, the straw worker, the maker of corn dollies and many other now extinct trades.

Later he wrote a number of books which were edited by Enid Porter and published. He was a popular speaker at community groups and made several TV appearances. He was interviewed by Anglia TV's Dick Joice and featured in one of the Bygones books.

In a letter published in a local newspaper he wrote that he had nearly finished a hand-written manuscript for a book of ghosts, witches and haunted houses, this does not appear to have been published. By this time Enid Porter, the editor of his earlier publications had retired.

== Death ==
Randell died on 26 March 1988 in the North Cambridgeshire Hospital, Wisbech. His funeral service was held at Friday Bridge church and he was interred at Elm Cemetery.

== Bibliography ==
- Sixty Years a Fenman (London Routledge & Kegan Paul, 1966) - Arthur Randell, edited by Enid Porter
- Fenland Railwayman (London Routledge & Kegan Paul, 1968) - Arthur Randell, edited by Enid Porter
- Fenland Memories (London Routledge & Kegan Paul, 1969) - Arthur Randell, edited by Enid Porter
- Fenland Molecatcher (London Routledge & Kegan Paul, 1970) - Arthur Randell, edited by Enid Porter
