= Histon Road Cemetery, Cambridge =

Cemetery in Cambridge, England

Coordinates: 52.2157°N 0.1122178°E

Histon Road Cemetery, formerly Cambridge General Cemetery, is a cemetery in north Cambridge, England, lying off Histon Road, opened in 1842. It is notable as one of only three designs by John Claudius Loudon, who covers it in detail in his influential book On the Laying Out, Planting and Managing of Cemeteries (1843); the other cemeteries associated with Loudon are Bath Abbey Cemetery, and Southampton Old Cemetery (where his plan was rejected). These experiences of practical planning directly affected Loudon's writing on the subject.

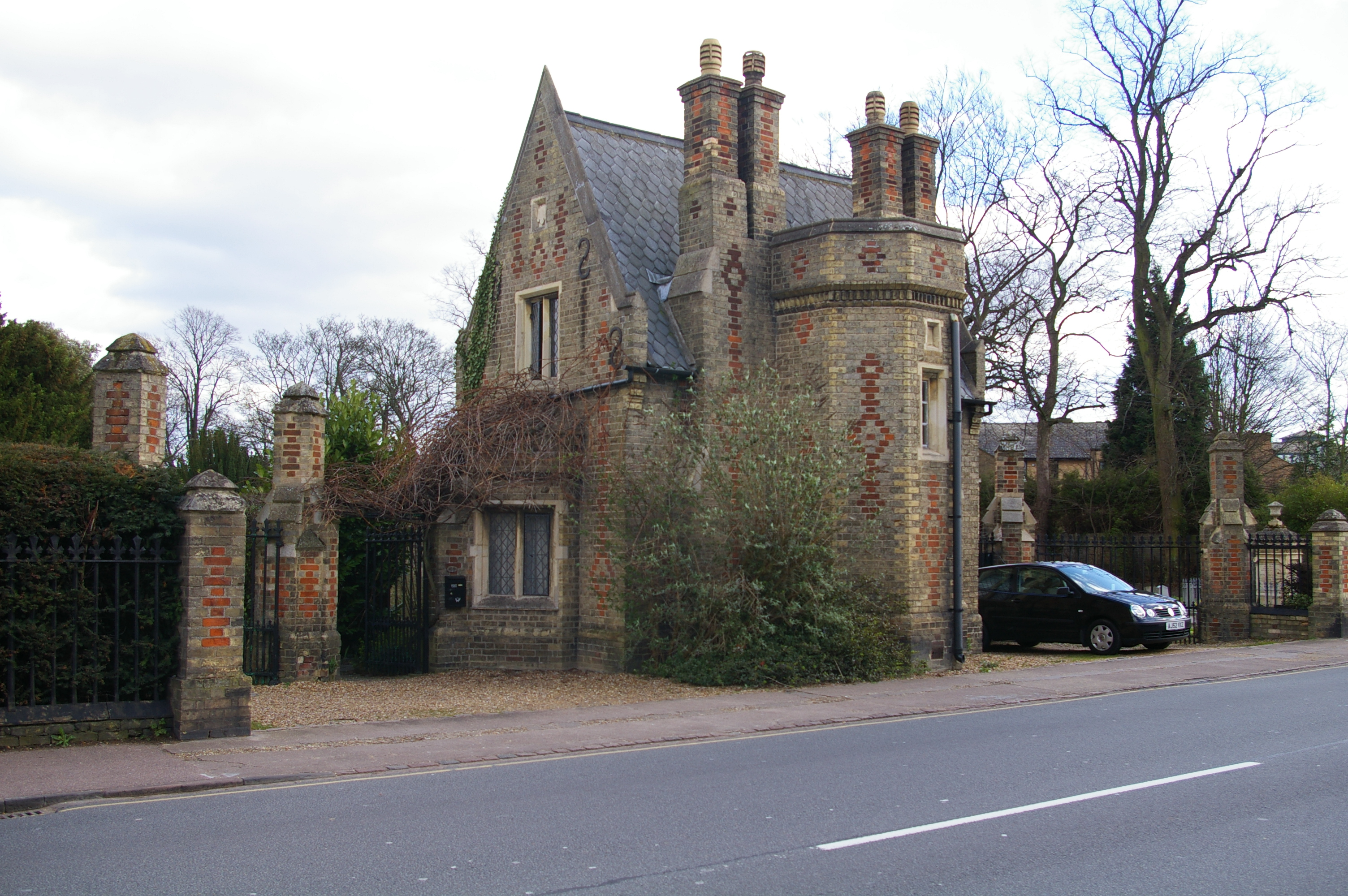
Lodge and entrance at Histon Road cemetery.

== Plan ==
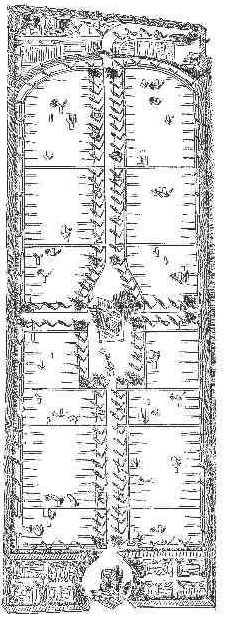
Original plan as published by Loudon in 1843 in the Gardener's Magazine.

The site is approximately 1 hectare in area (1.25 ha in some sources). Loudon used plans for the Histon Road cemetery as illustrative of his views on cemetery design. Research has indicated that the actual work carried out on the cemetery, which opened in 1843 (the year of his death), does not correspond closely with Loudon's announcements.

According to the Parks and Gardens UK website, as part of the rationale for including Histon Road Cemetery on the Register of Parks and Gardens of Special Historic Interest at Grade II*:

The cemetery embodies Loudon's most important ideas on cemetery design and is an early example of the grid pattern layout adopted for many later cemeteries.

The buildings were by the architect Edward Buckton Lamb; Lamb had been an associate of Loudon from the early 1830s, when Loudon employed him as a draughtsman. They comprised a chapel (demolished in the 1950s) and a Lodge that is now a private residence. The chapel with its "very elegant stained windows" was mentioned in the diary of Joseph Romilly. The design as built was Gothic and made of white brick, not in the Italian style put forward by Lamb and Loudon. The chapel contained a memorial dated 1851 to Ebenezer Foster (1777-1851) and his wife Elizabeth, by James Rattee.

The Lodge and gates are now Grade II listed buildings.

== Management ==
Histon Road Cemetery was one of the first British cemeteries open to all. The first was Rosary Cemetery, Norwich (1821).

The cemetery was initially (1843) the property of the Cambridge Cemetery Company which had been set up on 12 October 1842, by Robert Peters of Downing Street, Cambridge; there had been calls in the local press for more burial grounds for a decade. The policy of the Company made no religious conditions on burials.

Control passed to the Borough of Cambridge in 1935. The decision to demolish the chapel because of the cost of necessary repairs was taken in 1957. From 2007 the cemetery has been run by Cambridge City Council (Open Spaces) working with its Friends group.

The Commonwealth War Graves Commission maintains the graves of 12 First World War and 6 Second World War service personnel.

== Burials ==
There have been over 8000 burials at the cemetery. A listing of monumental inscriptions was made by Lucy Joan Slater (unpublished, deposited at Cambridge Record Office).

Those interred include:

- Mary Bateson (1865–1906)
- Charles Edmund Brock (1870–1938)
- Albert George Dew-Smith (1848–1903), co-founder of the Cambridge Scientific Instrument Company
- Alfredo Kanthack (1863–1898), Brazilian microbiologist
- William Fiddian Moulton (1835–1898)
- Henry Wiles (1838–1930), sculptor.
