= Granta School =

Special school in Cambridgeshire, England

Location
- Cambridge Road; Linton, Cambridgeshire, CB21 4NN; England
- Coordinates: 52°05′59″N 0°16′03″E

Information
- Type: Community special school
- Established: 2006
- Local authority: Cambridgeshire
- Department for Education URN: 134937 Tables
- Headteacher: Sarah Crouch
- Gender: Coeducational
- Age: 3 to 19
- Enrolment: 179
- Website: http://www.granta.cambs.sch.uk/web/

Granta School is a community special school in Linton, South Cambridgeshire, England.

== Background ==
Established in 2006, the school is designed to assist with moderate learning difficulties, severe learning difficulties and profound and multiple learning difficulties. The School has a nursery and sixth form facilities.

In November 2022 the school received an Ofsted rating of "good".

The school serves students from Cambridgeshire, Essex, Suffolk and Hertfordshire.

Granta School is located on the same site as Linton Village College.

The school has a 6.2:1 pupil/teacher ratio.
