= Howes, Cambridgeshire =

Former hamlet in Cambridgeshire, England

Coordinates: 52.2228°N 0.0928°E

Howes was a hamlet located on Huntingdon Road between Girton and Cambridge. It was known to have been in existence by 1219 and it began to decline in the mid-fifteenth century with there being no record of it after 1600. The word "howe" means barrow, and the hamlet's name may have been derived from several Romano-British burial mounds in the area, one of which was uncovered during construction of the Huntingdon Road turnpike in 1745.
