= Northampton Street, Cambridge =

Street in Cambridge, England

Coordinates: 52°12′37″N 0°06′45″E

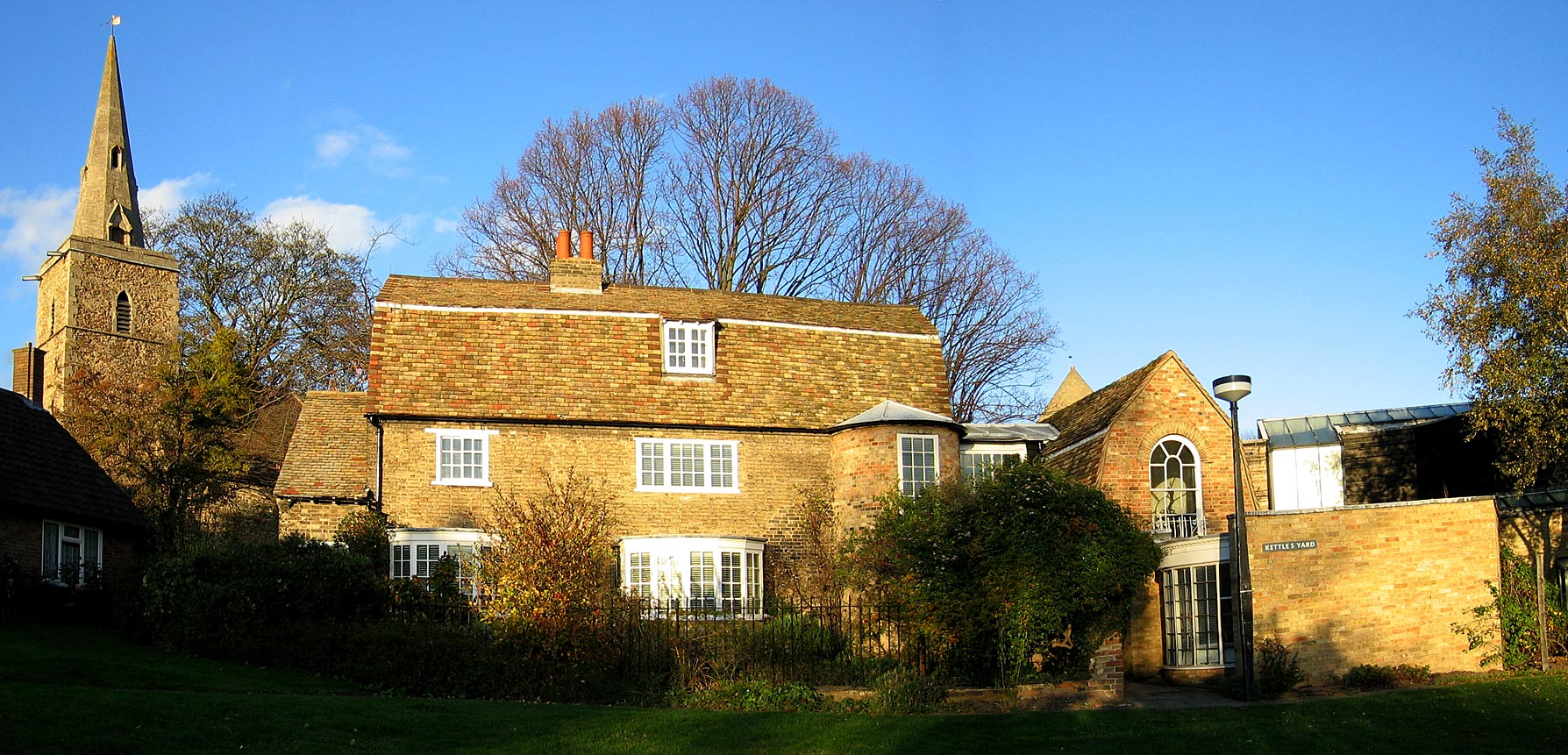
The three cottages which comprise the main house of Kettle's Yard, off Northampton Street.

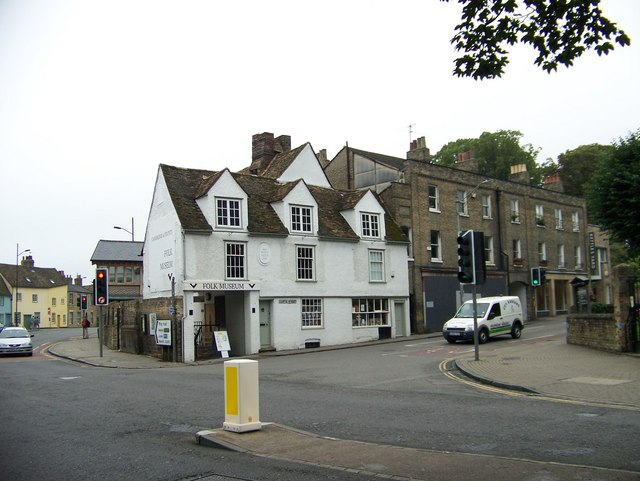
The Cambridge & County Folk Museum, on the corner of Castle Street and Northampton Street.

Northampton Street (part of the A1303) is a street in the north of central Cambridge, England. It runs between Madingley Road and Queen's Road to the west and Castle Street, by Castle Hill, Chesterton Lane (then Chesterton Road), and Magdalene Street to the east.

Northampton Street is part of the Cambridge inner ring road and thus has heavy traffic. The majority of properties on the south side of Northampton Street are owned by University of Cambridge colleges. On the north side there is Local Authority, private, and student housing, and also a public house.

To the south is St John's College, one of the largest University of Cambridge colleges, and the River Cam. Historic buildings include the School of Pythagoras and Kettle's Yard. To the north is Honey Hill. On the corner of Castle Street and Northampton Street is the Cambridge & County Folk Museum.
