= Kettle's Yard =

Art museum & house in Cambridge, England

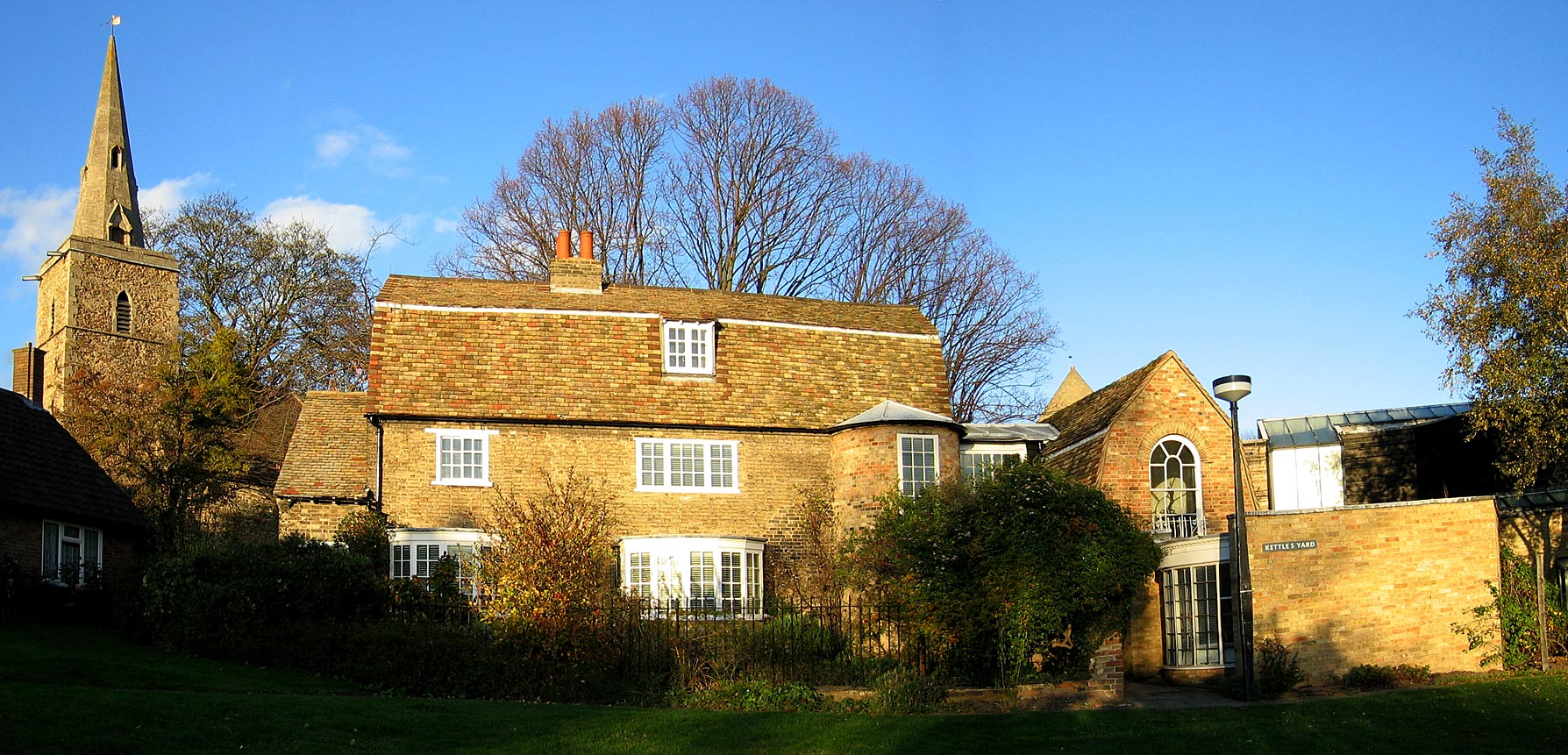
- The cottages which comprise the main house of Kettle's Yard
- Location: Cambridge
- Coordinates: 52.2109°N 0.1141°E
- Collections: art collections
- Visitors: 231,941 (2019)
- Founder: Jim Ede
- Director: Andrew Nairne
- Owner: University of Cambridge

University of Cambridge Museums
- Fitzwilliam Museum; Kettle's Yard; Museum of Archaeology and Anthropology; Museum of Classical Archaeology; Whipple Museum of the History of Science; Sedgwick Museum of Earth Sciences; The Polar Museum; Museum of Zoology

Kettle's Yard is an art gallery and house in Cambridge, England. The director of the art gallery is Andrew Nairne, who took up the post in November 2011. Both the house and gallery reopened in February 2018 after an expansion of the facilities.

== History and overview ==
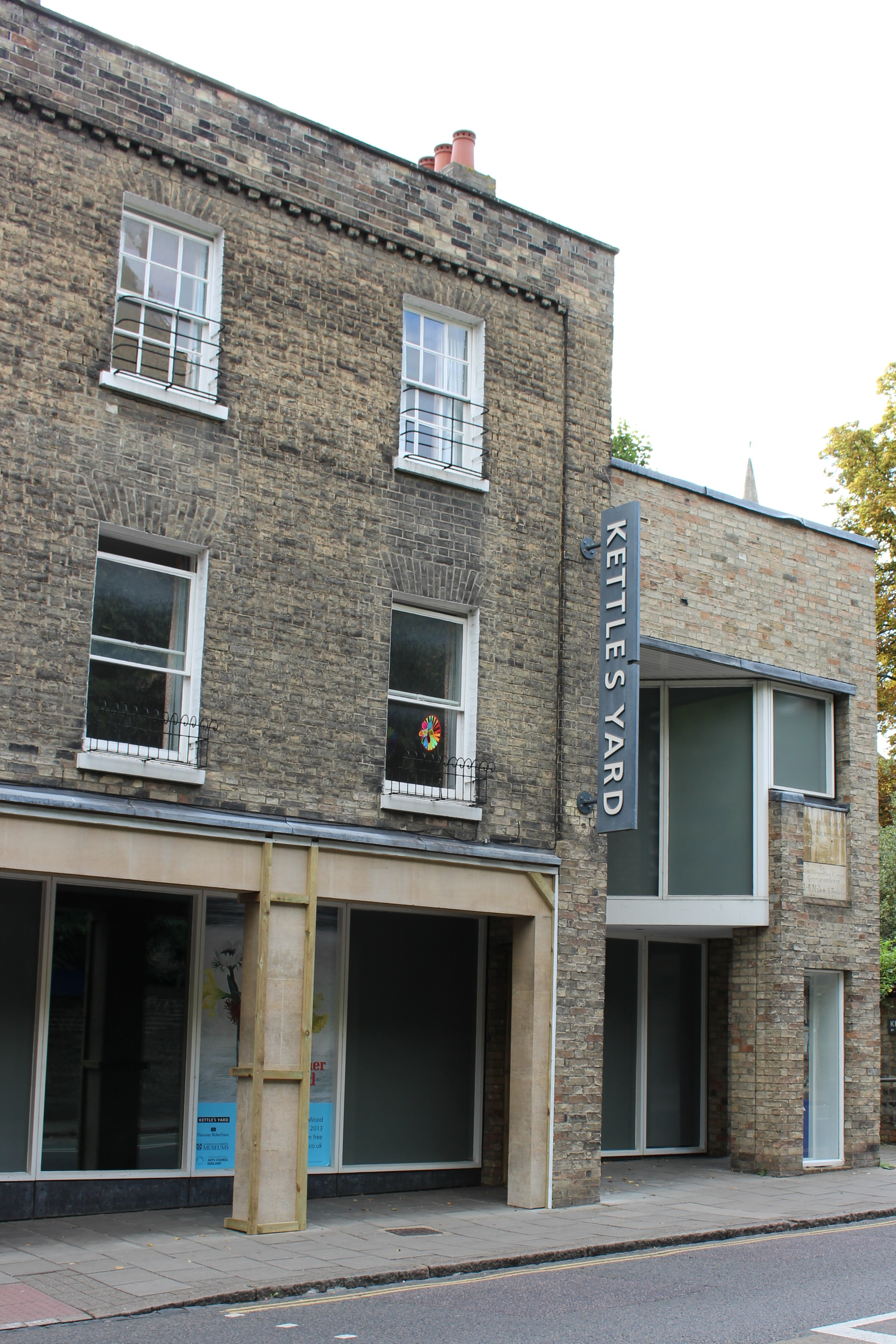
The gallery facade on Castle Street as it looked before the 2018 redevelopment

Kettle's Yard House and Gallery lies on the west side of Castle Street, between Northampton Street and St Peter's Church.

It was originally the Cambridge home of Jim Ede and his wife Helen. Moving to Cambridge in 1956, they converted four small cottages with the help of Winton Aldridge into one idiosyncratic house and a place to display Ede's collection of early 20th-century art. Ede maintained an 'open house' each afternoon, giving any visitors, particularly students, a personal tour of his collection.

In 1966, Ede gave the house and collection to the University of Cambridge, but continued living there before he and his wife moved to Edinburgh in 1973. The house is preserved as the Edes left it, making a very informal space to enjoy the permanent collection and live music. In 1970, the house was extended, adding an exhibition gallery in a contrasting modernist style by Leslie Martin.

The house and gallery temporarily closed in June 2015 during a major building project to create a four-floor education wing, improved exhibition galleries, a new entrance area and a café. A series of gentle additions by Jamie Fobert Architects offers greatly improved support services for visitors, including a new courtyard and welcome area and a new shop. The project cost £11,000,000 including £2,320,000 from the Heritage Lottery Fund and £3,700,000 from Arts Council England. The interior of the house has been left untouched.

During the closure, there were displays of the collection at the Fitzwilliam Museum in Cambridge and the Jerwood Gallery in Hastings.

Kettle's Yard is part of the University of Cambridge Museums consortium.

== Permanent collection ==
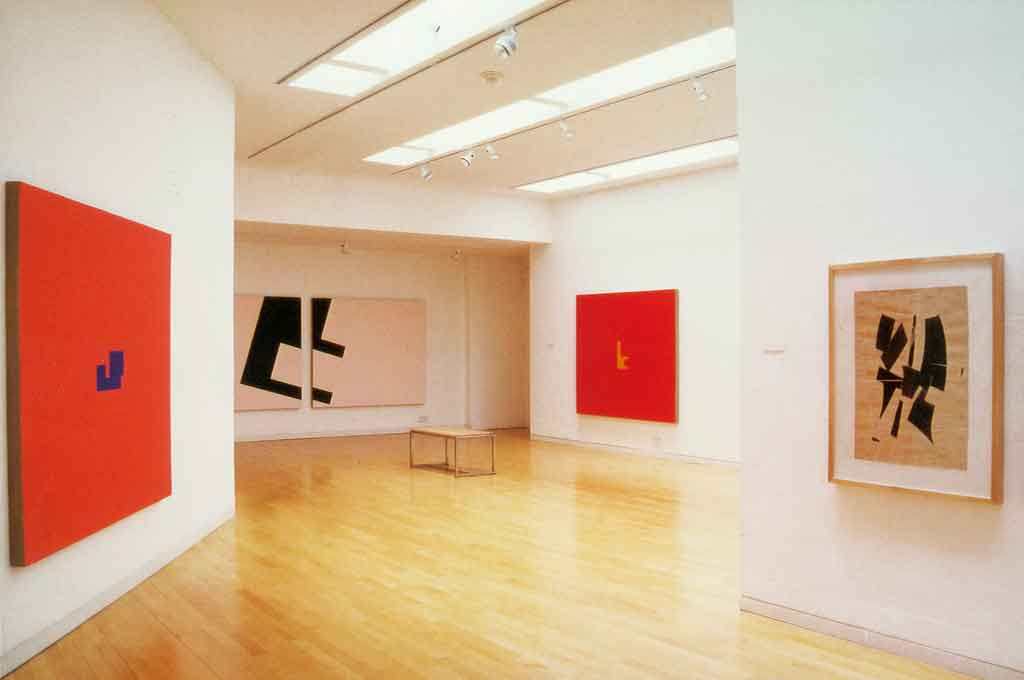
An exhibition of Diet Sayler in the gallery in 2000

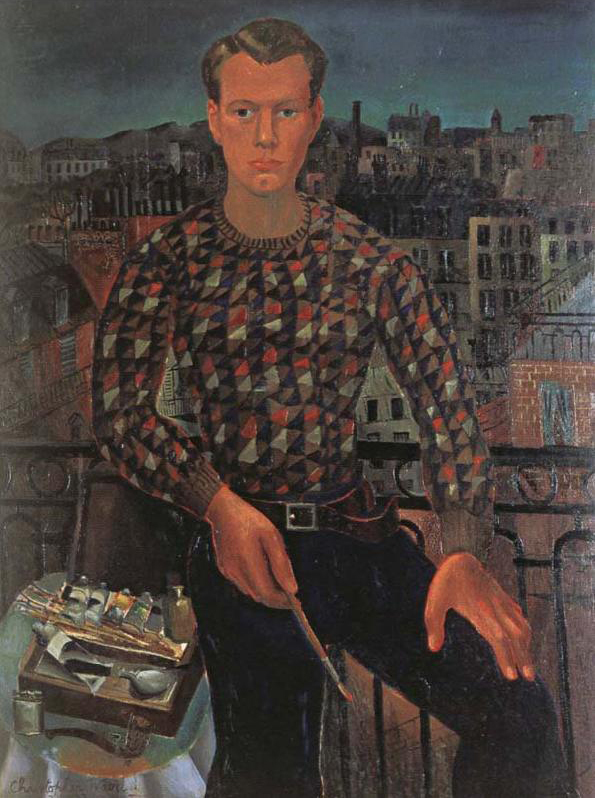
Christopher Wood Self-portrait (1927)

The permanent collection is composed of paintings, sculptures and objects collected by Ede. It is largely based on associations and friendships formed when Ede was a curator at Tate Gallery, and as such primarily features works from the British avant-garde of the first half of the 20th century.

Ian Hamilton Finlay described Ede's "fusion of art and found objects" on an inscribed pebble as "the Louvre of the pebble".

Notable artists represented in the collection are:

- Constantin Brâncuși
- William Congdon
- Helen Frankenthaler
- Henri Gaudier-Brzeska
- Ian Hamilton Finlay
- Barbara Hepworth
- David Jones
- Joan Miró
- Henry Moore
- Ben Nicholson
- David Peace
- Winifred Nicholson
- Alfred Wallis
- Christopher Wood

== See also ==
- Primavera Gallery on King's Parade, has put on several exhibitions at Kettle's Yard
- Wysing Arts Centre, a research and development centre for the arts, west of Cambridge in Bourn
