= William Congdon =

American artist

- Born: April 15, 1912; Providence, Rhode Island, U.S.
- Died: April 15, 1998 (aged 86); Milan, Italy
- Education: Pennsylvania Academy of the Fine Arts, Pennsylvania, United States of America
- Known for: Painting, Sculpture, Drawing
- Movement: Abstract Art

William Grosvenor Congdon (April 15, 1912 – April 15, 1998) was an American painter who became notable as an artist in New York City in the 1940s, but lived most of his life in Europe.

== Early life and education ==
William Grosvenor Congdon was born on April 15, 1912, in Providence, Rhode Island, the second child of Gilbert Maurice Congdon and Caroline Rose Grosvenor, who married in 1910. Both parents came from rich families: the Congdons dealt in iron, steel and metals, while the Grosvenors owned a textile manufacturing business in Rhode Island. They had five children, all sons. William Congdon was the cousin of the Isabella Gardner, the American poet and grand-niece of Isabella Stewart Gardner and second wife of the American poet-critic Allen Tate, who is spoken of in personal letters between Tate and Jacques Maritain.

After graduating from St. Mark's School of Southborough, Massachusetts, he studied English literature at Yale University and graduated in 1934. For three years, Congdon took painting lessons in Provincetown with Henry Hensche, followed by a further three years of drawing and sculpture lessons with George Demetrios in Boston and then Gloucester. For some months in 1934–35, he frequented the Pennsylvania Academy of the Fine Arts in Philadelphia.

== World War II ==
After the United States entered the Second World War, Congdon (on April 20, 1942) signed a one-year contract as a volunteer ambulance driver with the American Field Service (in the end, he would serve a total of three years). He served with the British 9th Army in Syria, and with the British 8th Army in North Africa (El Alamein), Italy (where he took part in the Battle of Montecassino) and Germany: as a member of the C Platoon of AFS567 (Coy) he was one of the first Americans to enter the Nazi death camp of Bergen-Belsen.

Apart from a few brief visits to the USA, he used all his leave during this period to visit cities, art monuments and exhibitions (he himself would organize a ceramics exhibition in Faenza in March 1945). During the war, Congdon made drawings of the people and places he encounters and recorded his experiences in a diary and in letters to his parents. Only a few months after his return to the United States, he left again for Italy, as a volunteer with the Quaker American Friends Service Committee to help rehabilitate the most stricken areas, distributing aid to war victims and rebuilding villages in Molise.

== Maturity: New York ==
Congdon went to live in New York in February 1948, renting a room on Stanton Street in the Bowery. From this point up, cities would become a leitmotif of his painting; the city was seen as the setting of history, as the site of social tensions and dramas. The first depictions of New York – crumbling façades of cheap buildings, jittery, nervously-penned windows that offer no dominant perspective over a heaving urban magma – seem to reflect the same moral criticism that can be seen in his war drawings.

With a new generation of “American” artists – Mark Rothko, Arshile Gorky, Willem de Kooning, Jackson Pollock, Franz Kline, William Baziotes, Robert Motherwell, Clyfford Still, Barnett Newman, Richard Pousette-Dart – the city now had an artistic culture that was as stimulating as that of Paris in the 1920s. Through his frame-maker, Leo Robinson, Congdon met Betty Parsons. Betty took over Peggy Guggenheim’s “The Art of This Century gallery” after it had closed down. The gallery eventually became one of the prime venues for the promotion of the New York School. Congdon began his almost-twenty-year association with the gallery with his first one-man show in May 1949, on the occasion of which he met most of the leading artists of the day, forming particularly close links with Richard Pousette-Dart and Mark Rothko. In 1950 Congdon exhibited at the Betty Parsons Gallery with Clyfford Still, and in 1951 at the Whitney Museum of American Art. In 1952 he exhibited at Duncan Phillips Gallery with Nicolas de Staël, and his work was also featured in exhibitions at the Whitney and the Art Institute of Chicago.

== Maturity: Venice ==
In the 1950s Congdon was recognized as one of the leading painters in the United States and quickly attained an international reputation as an Abstract Expressionist. In 1951 Time magazine published a long article on him, and his works were selling well, attracting the attention of major museums. But once again he turned his back on his homeland to go and live in Italy, mainly in Venice, where he befriended Peggy Guggenheim who became a collector of his paintings.

During the 1950s Congdon travelled extensively, but Venice was the city he chose as his home for most of this time. He had been there as a child, with his mother and brother. He admitted in the early 1960s that his return there after the tragedies of the war and his rejection of the “American dream” involved a complete rejection of “the material”. In Venice, Congdon was brought into contact with the great Venetian tradition that runs from Vittore Carpaccio to Francesco Guardi; and at the same time, he saw how modern painters – from J. M. W. Turner to Claude Monet – had rendered this incomparable subject. The quality of his St. Mark’s Squares, his Palazzi, his views of the less usual sights of Venice was soon recognized in America. His decade-long relationship with Venice was interrupted on occasion. Suddenly the city would cease to reveal itself to the artist, and the need to travel would make itself felt again.

== Religious Conversion ==
In 1959, after a trip to Cambodia, Congdon returned to Assisi in Italy, where he was received into the Roman Catholic faith at the Pro Civitate Christiana. Congdon, who had often gone back to Assisi during his travels, would write repeatedly about how, admiring and depicting the Franciscan landscape, he had uncovered the bone of his own existence; how he had learned the truth of certain values and the confidence to see himself as he was. The origins of his conversion lie in a series of meetings with the founder of Pro Civitate Christiana, Fr Giovanni Rossi – meetings that would then be followed by others with Jacques Maritain and Thomas Merton.

In 1961 Congdon's work was included in the Smithsonian Institution’s traveling exhibition 20th Century American Painting. In 1962 the book In My Disc of Gold, an account of Congdon’s spiritual and artistic life, was published both in Italy and in the USA, and an exhibition of his work was held in Milan. Two years later, his paintings were exhibited in the Vatican Pavilion of the 1964 New York World's Fair. In the spring of 1962 he went to visit Subiaco, Lazio and the monasteries overlooking the Aniene Valley, near Rome.

== The Representation of the Crucifix ==
Even after returning to landscape painting, until 1980 Congdon continued his artistic reflection on the Cross. Over two decades, there were developments and changes in the handling of this subject. Putting things very simply, one might identify the following phases. In the first works, the influence of the traditional iconography for such paintings clearly makes itself felt: the arms are shown forming a T or Y; the figure is light-colored; background tends to be dark; and the palette reveals some hint of realism (some trace of red, a mixture of black and ochre for the hair, with the occasional presence of gold).

By the mid-1960s, the realism in the depiction of the whole human figure was beginning to disappear, with the torso or arms just hinted at; this effect of zooming in on the head created a structural parallel with the form of a landscape (the two arms of Christ marking a sort of horizon). The journeys to India of 1973 and 1975 brought about another change, with Congdon drawing inspiration from the rag-clad wretches abandoned in the streets of Calcutta, stunted human larvae without arms or legs. The last traces of physiognomy, still recognizable in Crucifix 64, disappeared altogether by 1974.

== New Season of Travel ==
Travel was a way of extending his visual experience, of nourishing his art. With the exception of some important European trips (the Aeolian islands, Spain, Greece), most of Congdon's travelling during the 1970s took him far afield (air travel had replaced the liners of his youth). He visited North West Africa, Ethiopia, the Near and Middle East (from Turkey to the Yemen) and South America. There was also a change in his eye: if before he was looking for the monumental sites or the extremes of nature, he now looked at the world with the eye of an unassuming chronicler, someone moved by pity for what he saw, and depicted petrol tankers, the House of Slaves (Gorée) near Dakar, the trains in Tunisia, the houses in Sanaa. This different approach to the sites of the world is most fully revealed by the two trips to India in 1973 and 1975.

== Late Period: Lombardy ==
In the fall of 1979 Congdon moved his studio to an apartment adjacent to the Benedictine monastery Comunità Ss. Pietro e Paolo (Community of the Saints Peter and Paul) in Cascinazza, in the Milanese countryside of Gudo Gambaredo (Italy), where he would live for the rest of his life. He was aware that this was the last decisive move of his career; there would be no more traveling to far-flung places. At first, he was more than diffident towards his own “promised land”, but a few years later, the placid Lombardy plain, its florid meadows, the stark outline of its farmhouses, its low foggy sky, all found a vertical elevation in his paintings; they became the new points of reference for his imagination. Congdon now had to tackle a sky and earth that never seemed to change, that seemed the permanent heralds of death. In his diary he wrote that it was like going into exile from all that had previously supported, comforted, flattered and inspired him. In effect the demanding and unavoidable engagement with the land and the rhythm of the seasons had precise and decisive effects upon his art. From the early 1980s onwards, his draftsmanship became less taut, his paint less thick, his colors more sharply divided. While never totally denying a basis in naturalistic perception, the works of this new phase in his art reveal a greater degree of abstraction.

== Death ==
Congdon died on April 15, 1998, his 86th birthday. He painted up to a few days before his death. The palette range in his last painting reveals unusual combinations and contrapositions: for example, the sky in his very last work – Three Trees – is a startling innovation.

== Critical rediscovery ==
Even after his conversion to Catholicism, Congdon still had some opportunities to exhibit his work, both in Italy and in the United States. His last one-man show at the Betty Parsons Gallery was held in 1967. This date should be considered alongside the general unease felt in American intellectual circles at his conversion; with very few exceptions, critical attention to his work rapidly ceased, and the artist was left for dead in Assisi, a professional suicide.

The 1962 exhibition at the Palazzo Reale in Milano did not change things; nor did the two Galleria Cadario exhibitions (in Rome and Milan) in 1969. A change – though only a partial one – in this situation became apparent in the early 1980s. In 1980 a retrospective exhibition of his work was held in Rimini, Italy, during the first Meeting for Friendship Among Peoples.

In 1981 a retrospective exhibition of his work at the Palazzo dei Diamanti, in Ferrara, revived public interest in Congdon's career. His "re-appearance" was further helped by the creation, in October 1980, of a Foundation designed to promote knowledge and study of the artist's work.

== Oil paints ==
Throughout his career and as long as he had the strength, Congdon put his entire self into the work, in the smells, the incisions, the scrapings of medium across the hard board. His use of materials and on the painting’s surface indicate that his early training in sculpture never left him. He applied oil paints on a prepared – often black – board with masonry tools, palette knives, awls and spatulas, as well as large brushes, practically until the end of his life. Finally, in some cases, he would blow gold or silver powder on to the wet paint. In his later years, he forged a singular approach to painting that incorporated the physicality and spontaneity of action painting into forms of figuration and landscape.

== “Drawing with paint”: Pastels ==
In the last fifteen years of his life, besides painting with oils, Congdon did an increasing number of works on paper, using pastels. The expression “Drawing with paint” is the one Congdon himself used in September 1982 to announce his use of what for him was a new medium (pastels are in fact, a sort of pencil made of paint).

== The William G. Congdon Foundation ==
Established in 1980, the foundation bears Congdon’s name only since his death in 1998. Created at the artist’s behest, the foundation has the task of enhancing and communicating the significance of his work, by cataloguing his figurative and literary production and organizing exhibitions and other events.

Since its creation, the foundation has gradually become the custodian responsible for the maintenance and care of Congdon's paintings, drawings and other artistic works. Through progressive acts of donations – and ultimately through his last will and testament – the artist’s private collection has become the William. G. Congdon Foundation Collection – the property of the Foundation, which manages it in accordance with its own statutory purposes and aims.

== Works ==
Paintings :

- Naples Afternoon at the Museum of Fine Arts, Boston
- Canal at The Phillips Collection
- Venice at The Phillips Collection
- Destroyed City at the Addison Gallery
- Positano at the Addison Gallery
- Positano#1 at the Yale University Art Gallery
- Piazza San Marco at the Yale University Art Gallery
- Italian Moon at the Yale University Art Gallery
- Athens at the Museum of Modern Art
- Eiffel Tower #1, 1955 at the Memorial Art Gallery
- Piazza San Marco at Kettle's Yard
- Guatemala #7 at Kettle's Yard
- Canal from Giudecca at Kettle's Yard
- Indian Temple at Kettle's Yard
- Indian Temple 2 at Kettle's Yard
- Moon Night Subiaco at Kettle's Yard
- Moon Night Subiaco 2 at Kettle's Yard
