= Linton, Cambridgeshire =

Village in Cambridgeshire, England

Coordinates: 52.0991°N 0.277°E

Linton
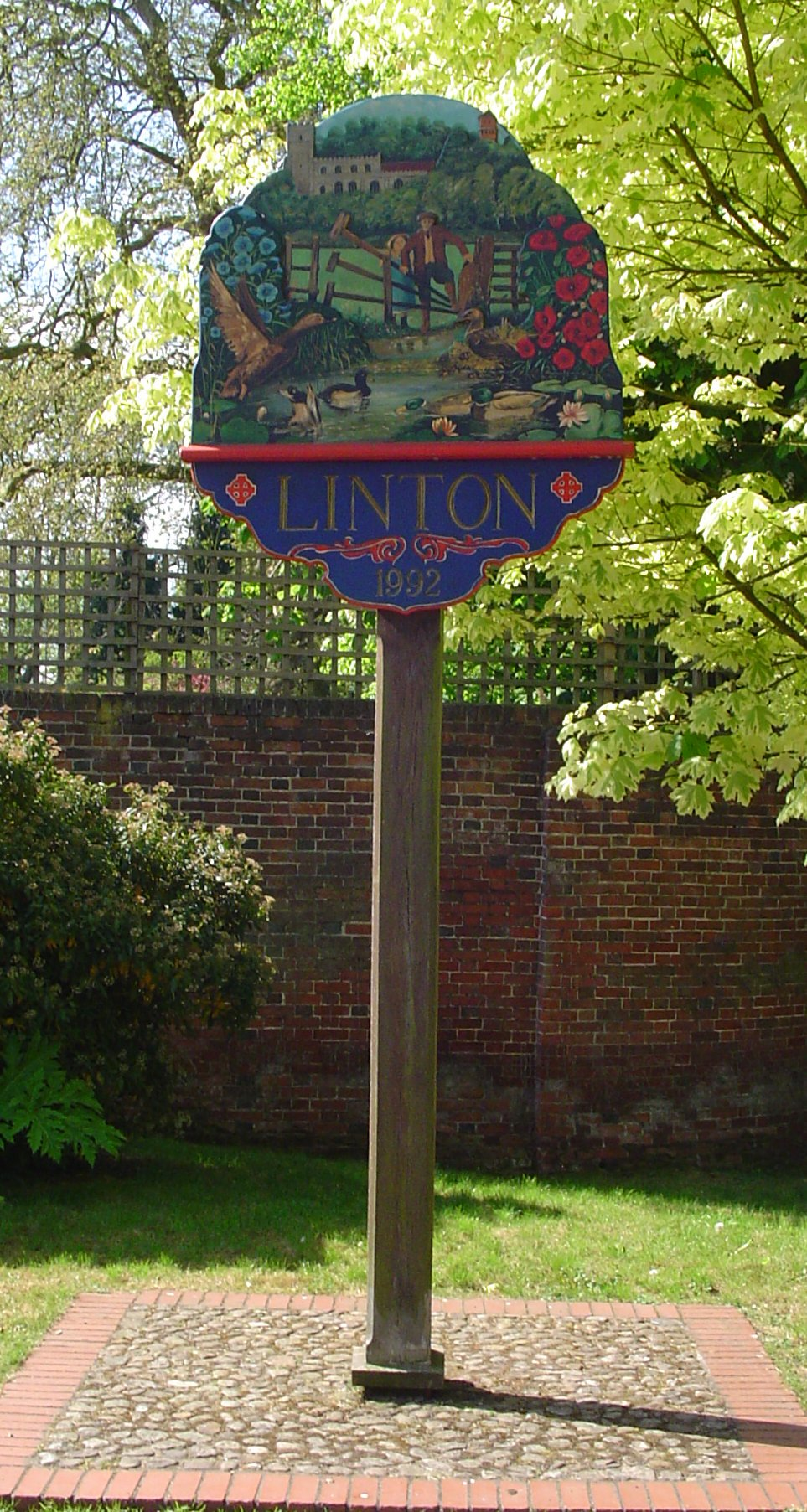
- Linton village sign showing the clapper stile

- Location within Cambridgeshire
- Population: 4,525 (2011)
- OS grid reference: TL560469
- District: South Cambridgeshire
- Shire county: Cambridgeshire
- Region: East
- Country: England
- Sovereign state: United Kingdom
- Post town: CAMBRIDGE
- Postcode district: CB21
- Dialling code: 01223
- Police: Cambridgeshire
- Fire: Cambridgeshire
- Ambulance: East of England
- UK Parliament: South Cambridgeshire

Linton is a village and civil parish in Cambridgeshire, England, on the border with Essex. The village is approximately 8 miles (13 km) southeast from the city and county town of Cambridge. The A1307 from Cambridge bypasses the village, while the B1052 passes through the village.

At the 2021 census, Linton parish had a population of 7,234.

== History ==
The Domesday Book of 1086 records Linton as "Lintone", with 27 households and two mills. A market was first held in Linton in 1246 after a charter had been granted by William de Say, Lord of the manor.

The railway station was on the Stour Valley Railway between Shelford and Colchester, closed since 1967.

The parish includes the deserted village of Barham.

There are more than 120 listed buildings in Linton, the High Street alone has over 50 of these. Since the 1960s the village has expanded and is now a dormitory village of Cambridge.

== Landmarks ==
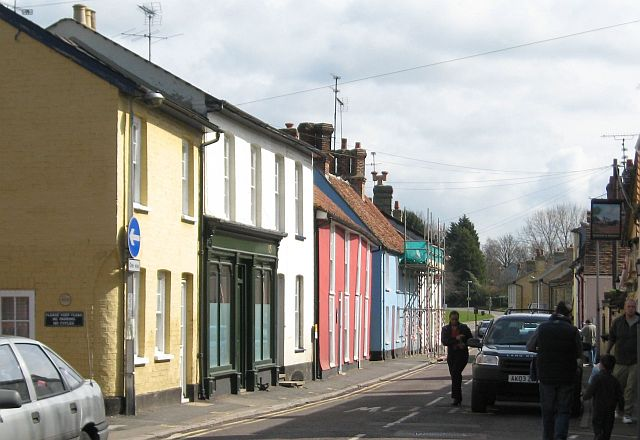
Linton High Street

St Mary's Parish Church is more properly known by its dedication to the Blessed Virgin Mary and is therefore the Parish Church of St Mary-the-Virgin serving the whole ecclesiastical parish of Linton. It has been established here on the banks of the River Granta for more than 800 years. The six bells of St Mary's were renovated in 2005. St Mary's bellringers are associated with the Ely Diocesan Association of Church Bell Ringers.

Linton House (64 High Street) is a Grade II* listed building. An L-shaped building, it was originally two houses, the later, built by John Lone dating from about 1690. The west doorcase is said to have been reclaimed from Catley Park.

Linton Zoo is on the southern edge of Linton village. At the north side of the parish is Chilford Hall and its vineyards.

On Rivey Lane at Rivey Hill is Linton Water Tower. The River Granta, a chalk stream, runs through the village. There are around 200 chalk streams, most of which are in England.The fish Brookes Lamprey has been seen in the River Granta at Leadwell Meadows.

Linton village is on the Icknield Way Path, 110-mile route from Ivinghoe Beacon in Buckinghamshire to Knettishall Heath in Suffolk. The Icknield Way Trail, a route used by walkers, horse riders and off-road cyclists, also passes through the village.

The author Graham Greene's wife once owned The Queens House in Linton. His wife Vivien bought the house in 1947 but sold the house in 1948. The house is on High Street, opposite The Crown public house, one of three public houses in the village.

There is a trading estate at The Grip.

== Education ==
There are four schools in Linton:

- Linton C of E Infant School is a church school in the middle of the village, teaching children aged 4 to 7. (Year reception-2)
- Linton Heights Junior School, a primary school which teaches children from ages 7 to 11. (Year 3-6)
- Linton Village College is a secondary school teaching children aged 11 to 16, (year 7-11) including those from surrounding villages.
- The Granta School, located on the same site as Linton Village College, is one of Cambridgeshire's six area special schools, where pupils with special educational needs from the ages of 3 to 19 are taught.

== Popular culture and trivia ==
The fictional Linton Travel Tavern is depicted in the BBC television sitcom I'm Alan Partridge, with resident Alan Partridge describing the town as equidistant between London and Norwich. Linton is near the halfway point of the London-to-Norwich A11 trunk road, although it is 4 miles (6.4 km) from the actual road. The hotel used for filming the series was the Hilton Hotel on the A41 near Bushey in south Hertfordshire.

The Wacky Races was a local annual event that occurred from 2002 to 2006 on the second Bank Holiday Weekend in May. It began on the extended bank holiday weekend, which commemorated Queen Elizabeth II's 50th coronation anniversary, and raised money for local charities. Participants would race in comedic, homemade costumes and carts down the High Street, with one team mate stopping in each pub to have a pint, and then racing through the fields next to the village and back down the High Street, again drinking in the pubs. Along the course, firemen, from Linton Fire Station, would spray water at the racers, as well as spectators utilising water pistols and water bombs.

== See also ==
- Linton railway station, a disused station that once served the village
- Notable people connected with Linton
- List of places in Cambridgeshire
- The Hundred Parishes
