= School of Pythagoras =

Historic building in Cambridge, England

Coordinates: 52.2098°N 0.1134°E

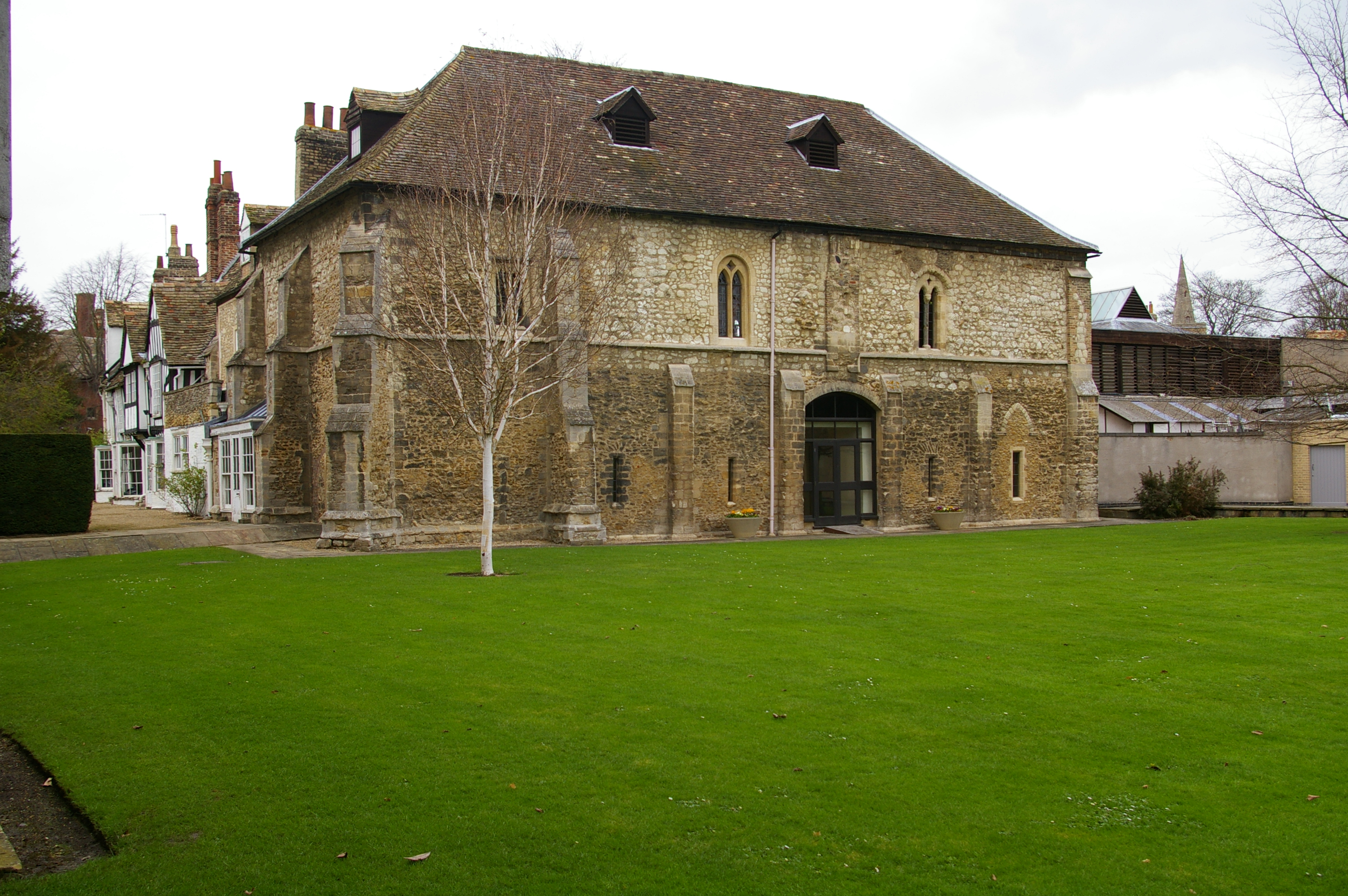
The School of Pythagoras

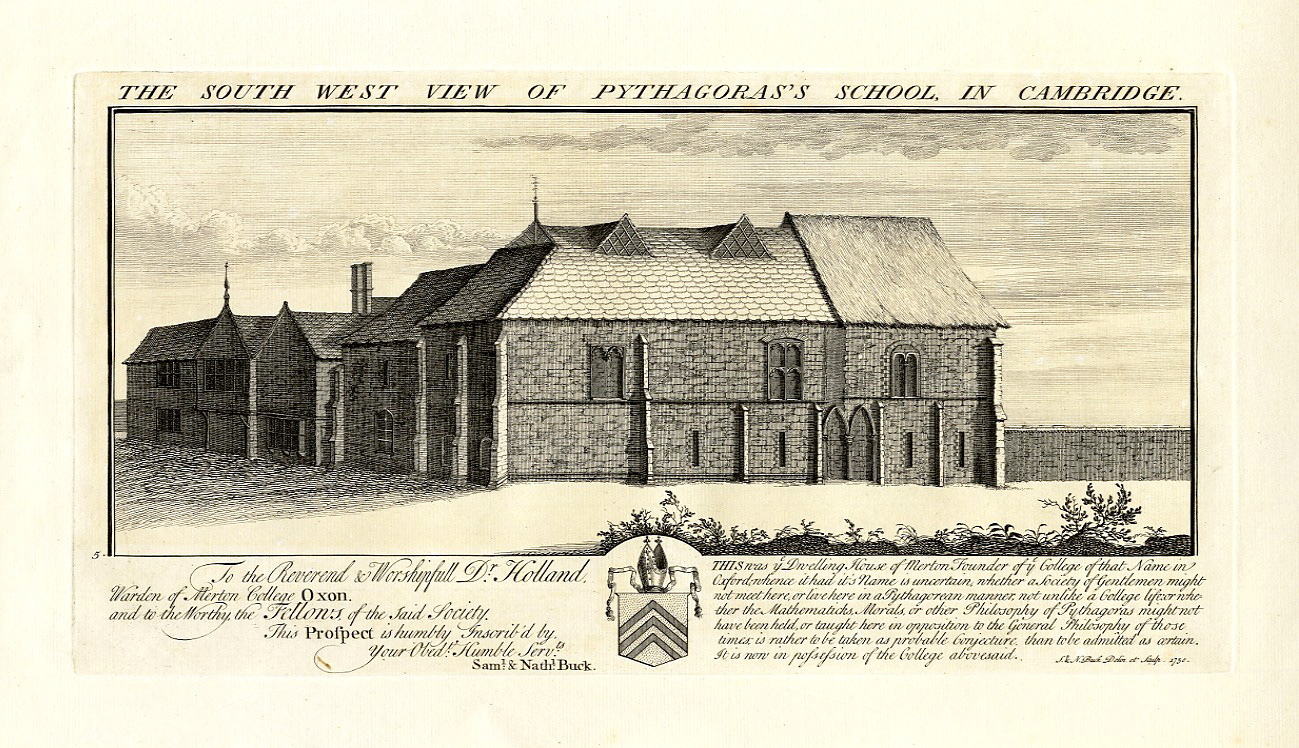
The School of Pythagoras in 1730, by Samuel and Nathaniel Buck

The School of Pythagoras is the oldest building in St John's College, Cambridge, and the oldest secular building in Cambridge, England. It is a Grade I listed building. To the north is Northampton Street.

== History ==
The School of Pythagoras was originally built around 1200, before even the University of Cambridge existed. It also predates St John's College, which was founded in 1511. It was initially a private house, but over the centuries it has had many uses. For a period it was a ruin. The reason for the name is unclear.

In the 16th century, a small manor house was added to its west side. This is known as Merton Hall. It is now used for graduate student accommodation. From 1266 until 1959 the School of Pythagoras and later Merton Hall were owned by Merton College, Oxford.

The School of Pythagoras is now used as the College Archive Centre. Previously it was used as a theatre and the base for the St John's College Dramatic Society; Douglas Adams appeared there in a revue in 1972.

== See also ==
- St Bene't's Church, the oldest building in Cambridge, dating from 1033
- Leper Chapel, dating from 1125
- Church of the Holy Sepulchre, Cambridge or Round Church, dating from 1130
- Pythagoras
