= Museum of Cambridge =

Coordinates: 52.210781°N 0.114755°E

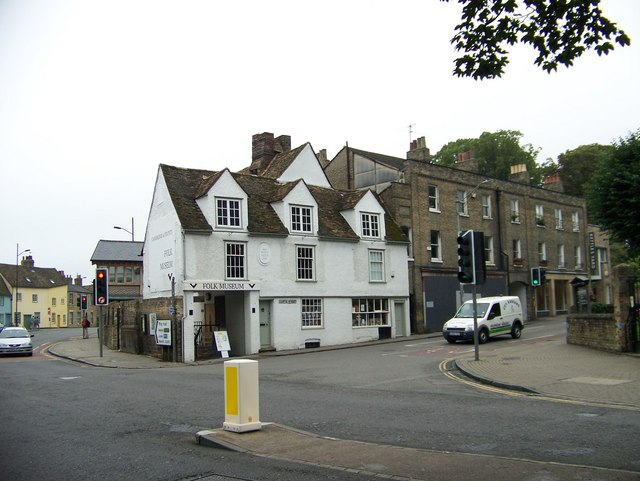
Museum of Cambridge

The Museum of Cambridge, formerly known as the Cambridge & County Folk Museum, is a museum located in Castle Street in central Cambridge, England.

== Overview ==
The museum is housed in the former White Horse Inn, a Grade II listed 16th century former public house that closed in 1934. It presents the lives of the people of Cambridge and its surrounding area, the county of Cambridgeshire and the Fens from 1700 onwards. The collection includes more than 20,000 objects reflecting the social history of Cambridge and Cambridgeshire, including applied art, coins, costumes, decorative art, fine art, hobbies, law and order, medals, medicine, music, social history, textiles and toys. The museum also holds oil paintings by local artist Mary Charlotte Greene (1860–1951), as well as inn signs by another local artist, Richard Hopkins Leach (1794–1851).

The museum is an independent charity, governed by a board of trustees. It also administers Capturing Cambridge, a website that crowd sources local history, documenting stories and memories across Cambridge and the surrounding area street by street.

== History ==
Cambridge & County Folk Museum first opened in 1936, following a 1933 exhibition organised by the Cambridgeshire Federation of Women's Institutes, entitled 'A Festival of Olden Times, held in Cambridge's Guildhall. Queen Mary visited the museum in 1938 and donated two exhibits, a miniature table and a tea caddy, the following year. In the museum's annual report of 1939 it stated that the collection had risen to over 1,900 exhibits.

By 1945 it was reported that the building would be required for a town improvement scheme and the museum committee would have to find a new home, but this did not come to pass. Enid Porter, a leading authority on Cambridgeshire culture, history, customs and beliefs and a pioneer of oral history, became Curator of the Museum in 1947, staying in the post until 1976.

In 1988 it was reported that the museum might have to close as it was running out of money. It was longlisted for the 2006 Gulbenkian Prize, but by 2017 was again in financial difficulties. In 2020, as a consequence of the COVID-19 pandemic, the museum launched a fundraising campaign with the support of Cambridge MP Daniel Zeichner. In May 2021, the museum announced the success of its fundraising campaign and re-opened to the public.

== See also ==
- Enid Porter
