= A1307 road =

Secondary class A road in Cambridgeshire and Suffolk, England

A1307

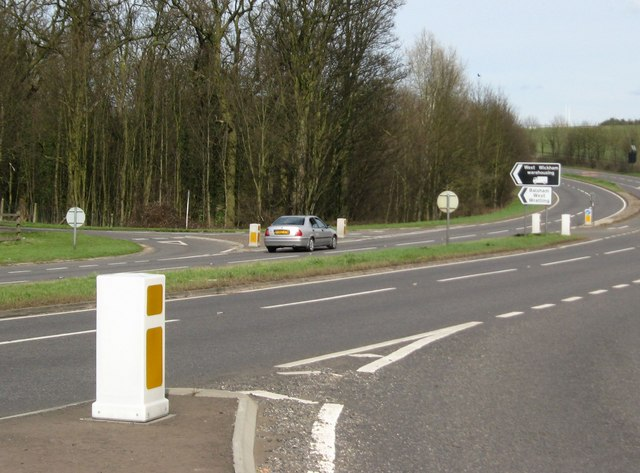
- Junction of the A1307 with the minor Bartlow/West Wratting road.

Route information
- Length: 44 mi (71 km)

Major junctions
- North/West end: Alconbury
- A1(M) A141 A1198; A14 A1134 A603 A1134; A11 ( A505) A1017 A134
- South/East end: Haverhill

Location
- Country: United Kingdom
- Primary destinations: Cambridge

Road network
- Roads in the United Kingdom; Motorways; A and B road zones

The A1307 is a secondary class A road in Cambridgeshire and Suffolk between the A1(M) near Alconbury and Haverhill, Suffolk. In 2020 the former A14 between North of Cambridge and Alconbury was reclassified as the A1307. The road generally follows the route of the Roman Road Via Devana from Alconbury to Haverhill, with a short interruption through Cambridge city centre.

== Route ==
=== Alconbury to Girton (formerly A14) ===
On 9 December 2019 the former A14 between Alconbury and Huntingdon travelling south-east towards Swavesey was reclassified as the A1307 following the opening of the Huntingdon Southern bypass, part of the A14 Cambridge to Huntingdon improvement scheme.

At Hinchingbrooke House it becomes the Views Common Link Road, which allows traffic to access Brampton Road from the A1(M) to the north, the A1 to the south and the A141 for Wisbech via Spittals Interchange. The road turns east before a complex of minor junctions takes the road to a partly grade-separated junction with the B1514 Brampton Road, heading west via an underpass bridge, a short way towards Hinchingbrooke Hospital.

The removal of A14 Huntingdon railway viaduct, passing over Huntingdon railway station and Brampton Road, was completed in Spring 2022, maintaining an alternative route for mainly local light vehicles via the A1307 from towns north of Cambridge to the A1(M). Junctions for light vehicles to Huntingdon town centre and Huntingdon railway station were opened in 2021. As of November 2023, temporary traffic restrictions remain in place for the development. Heavy goods vehicles and those over 14 feet 6 inches (4.42 m) are prohibited from parts of the route (due to a low underpass at Brampton Road).

From Huntingdon to the Swavesey interchange the A1307 also utilises the former A14 dual carriageway. En-route are junctions for Godmanchester, the Hemingfords, St Ives, and Fenstanton (former A14 Junctions 24–27). From the Swavesey interchange to Bar Hill the former A14 Eastbound carriageway is utilised, including a new grade separated junction for Lolworth. From Bar Hill to the Girton interchange (the old northern terminus of the A1307), the A1307 follows local access roads (opened in 2019) running parallel to the A14. A 40 mph (64 km/h) speed limit has been in place to this section of the road since 2020 due to issues with the traffic barriers as well as due to flooding.

=== Cambridge City ===
From Oakington the A1307 is joined by traffic from junction 31 on the A14 with access from only A14 traffic from the west and access to westbound A14 traffic towards Huntingdon. The road immediately continues into Cambridge (Girton) and heads into the centre as Huntingdon Road, passing Fitzwilliam College to a junction with the Cambridge inner ring road (the A1134) where the northern A1307 designation terminates. The former Via Devana continues through Cambridge city centre as Bridge Street, Sidney Street, St. Andrew's Street and Regent Street. The southern A1307 designation heads south east out of Cambridge as Hills Road, signposted to Haverhill. As the road continues out of Cambridge it passes Addenbrooke's Hospital. The road then passes Babraham Park and Ride. Green buses may be seen from here in Cambridge. The road continues through the Gog Magog hills and past Wandlebury country park. The road then passes the Babraham business park and carries on to Abington, Fourwentways interchange with the A11 and services provided by Euro Garages and a hotel by Travelodge.

=== South Cambridge (Fourwentways) to Haverhill ===
After passing Little Abington and Hildersham, the road passes Linton on the south side with the B1052 providing access to the village centre and goes southbound to Saffron Walden. The road then terminates at Haverhill in Suffolk.
