= Boston Preservation Trust =

Heritage organisation in England

- Formation: 1934; 92 years ago
- Type: Heritage organisation
- Purpose: to improve and protect the architectural heritage of the town and local area
- Headquarters: Fydell House, South Street, Boston, Lincolnshire, PE21 6HT
- Region served: Boston, Lincolnshire

The Boston Preservation Trust was founded in 1934 to protect and restore Fydell House originally, with a wider scope quickly being built for the wider town of Boston, Lincolnshire in England. The vicar of Boston, Canon A. M. Cook was instrumental in coordinating and inspiring the purchase of Fydell House, protecting it from demolition.

== History and activities ==
In 1934, the fate of Fydell House in South Street was uncertain and under threat, a Birmingham consortium were planning to demolish it, favouring a development of new housing.

The vicar of Boston, Canon A. M. Cook, was so alarmed by the potential loss of the magnificent Fydell House that he worked with other local people to purchase it.

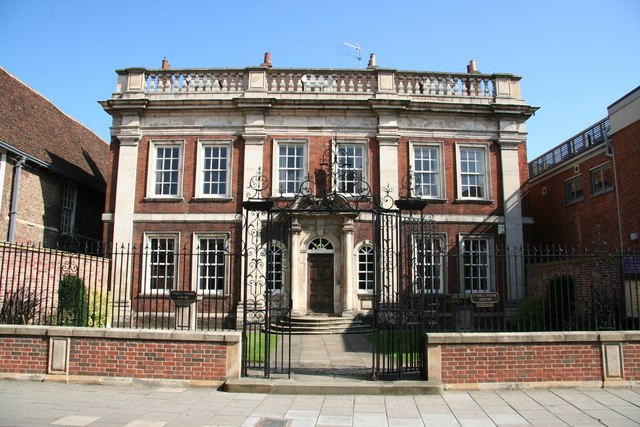

=== Civic group ===
The Civic Group of The Boston Preservation Trust was established around 1983 to protect and promote good quality planning, civic amenity, and protect significant buildings in the Borough of Boston.

=== Boston's blue plaque heritage trail ===
In 1998, The Boston Preservation Trust, Civic Group, established a heritage plaque scheme in the historic conservation area of Boston, Lincolnshire.

=== Funding and finances ===
National Lottery Heritage Fund has been awarded in 2019 to assist with the restoration of Fydell House, the major property associated with the Boston Preservation Trust.
