= Castle Street, Cambridge =

Street in the north of central Cambridge, England

Coordinates: 52°12′39″N 0°06′50″E

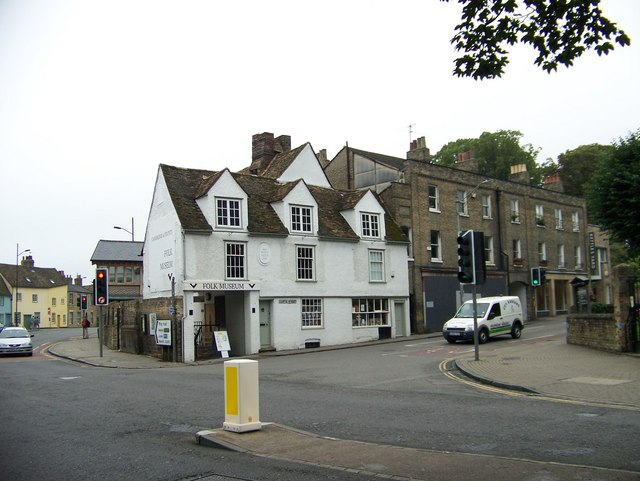
The Museum of Cambridge, on the corner of Castle Street and Northampton Street.

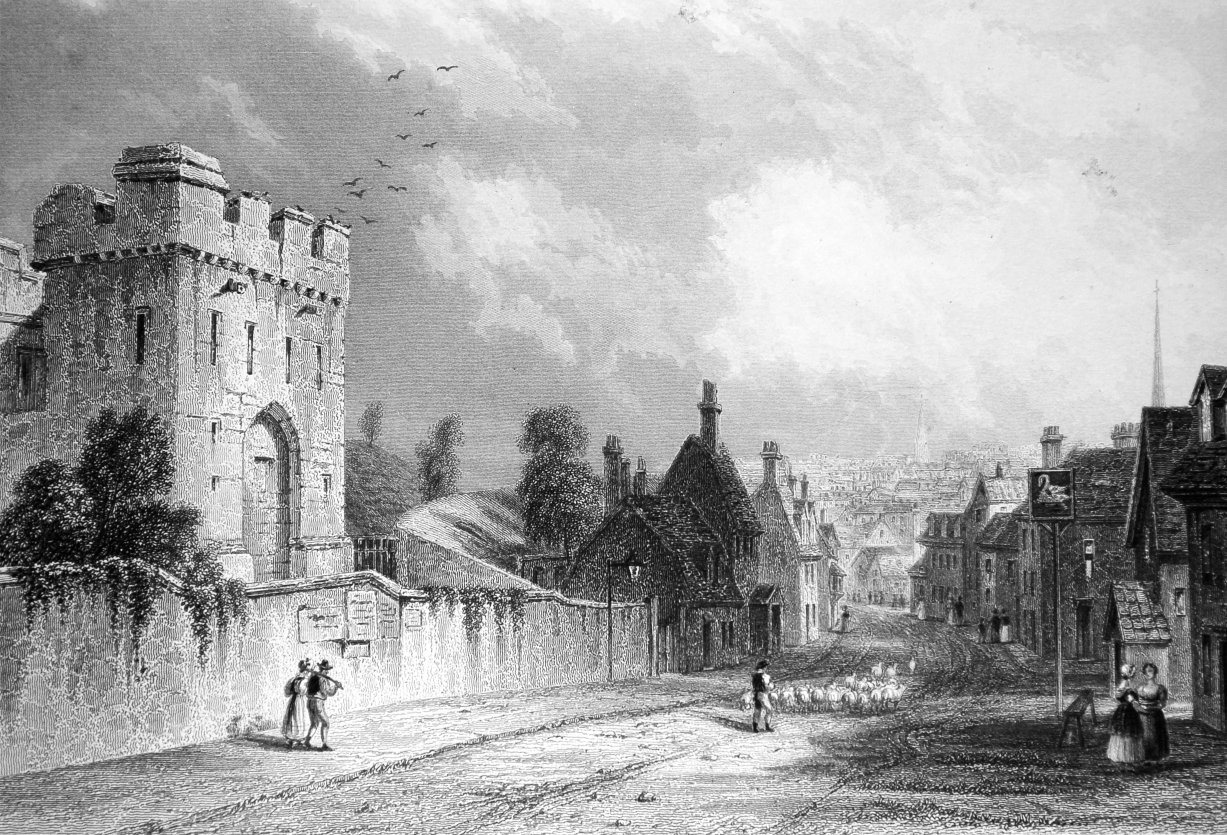
View down Castle Street with the Cambridge Castle gate from Memorials of Cambridge by Le Keux (1845).

Castle Street is a street in the north of central Cambridge, England. To the southeast is a junction with Northampton Street, Magdalene Street, and Chesterton Lane (leading to Chesterton Road). To the northwest is a junction with Mount Pleasant, Huntingdon Road (leading northwest out of Cambridge), Histon Road (leading north out of Cambridge), and Victoria Road.

To the northeast is St Giles' Church, Castle Hill, the location of Cambridge Castle, and the Cambridgeshire Shire Hall. To the southwest is St Peter's Church and Honey Hill. On the corner of Castle Street and Northampton Street is the Museum of Cambridge, formerly the Cambridge & County Folk Museum. Also here is Kettle's Yard, a former home and now a modern art gallery and place for reflection.

St Giles' Church, St Peter's Church and Castle Street Methodist Church are beside the street. The Castle Inn public house is also located here.

== Gallery ==
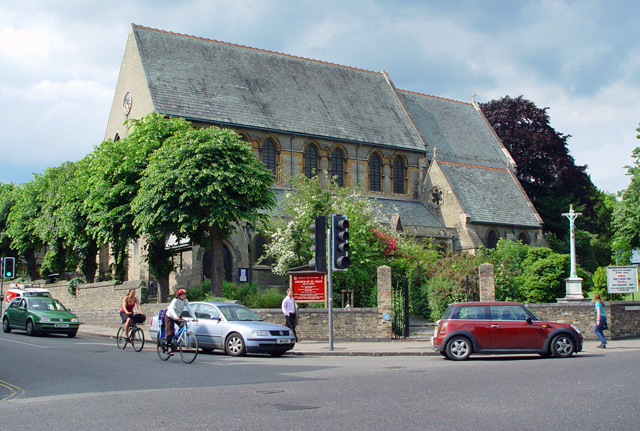
St Giles' Church at the southwestern end of Chesterton Lane.

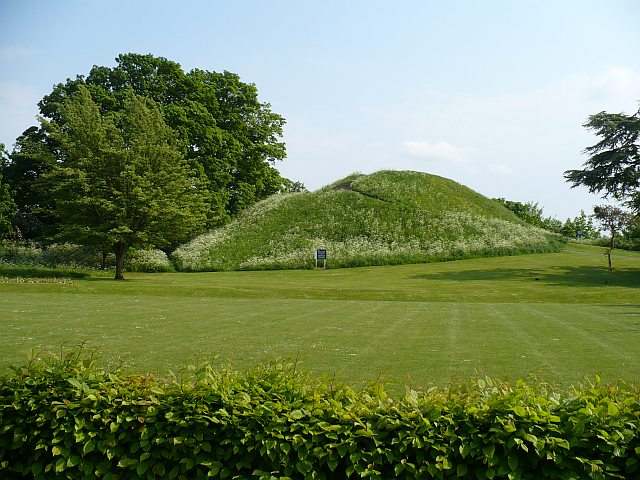
Castle Mound, all that remains of Cambridge Castle on Castle Hill near Castle Street.

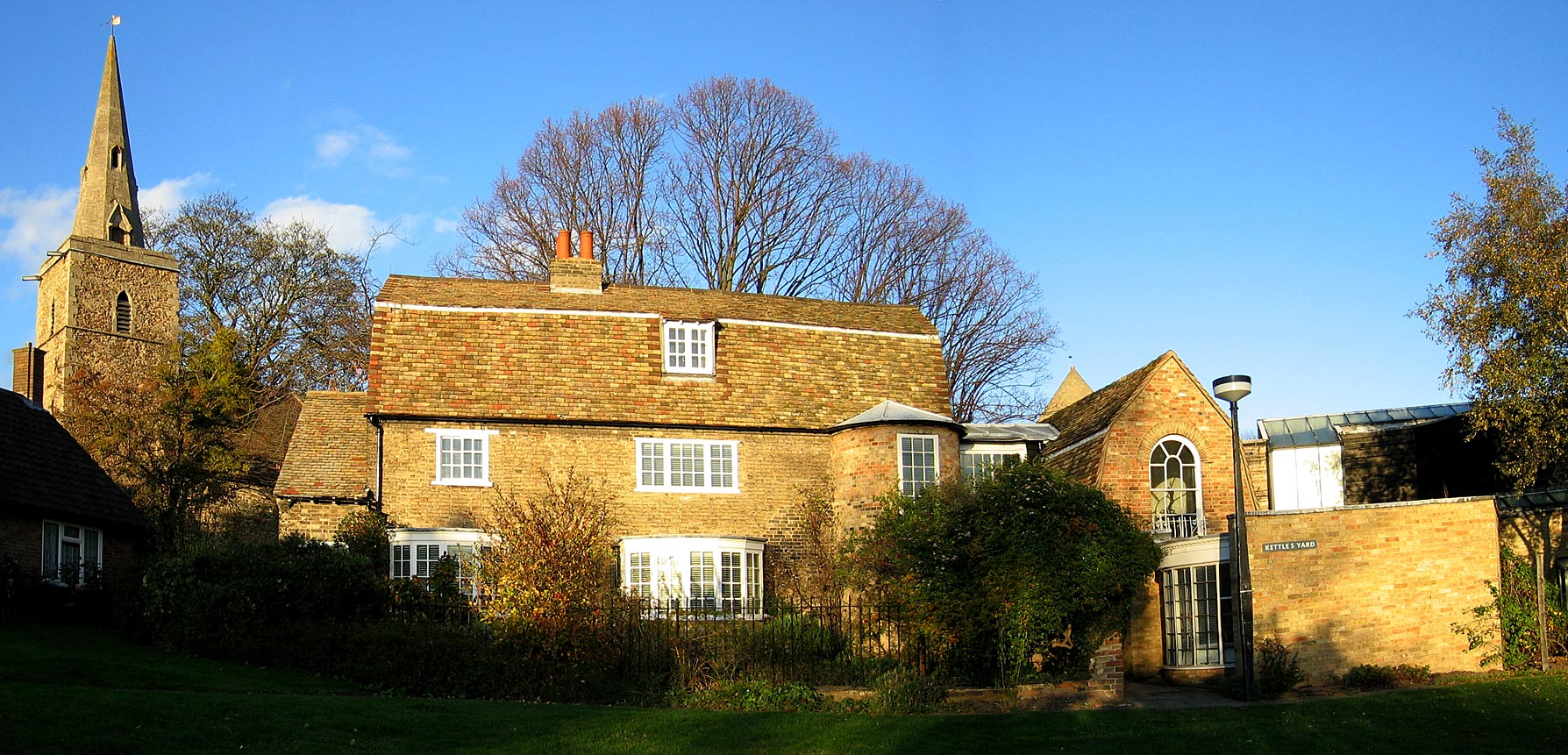
The three cottages that comprise the main house of Kettle's Yard, near Castle Street.

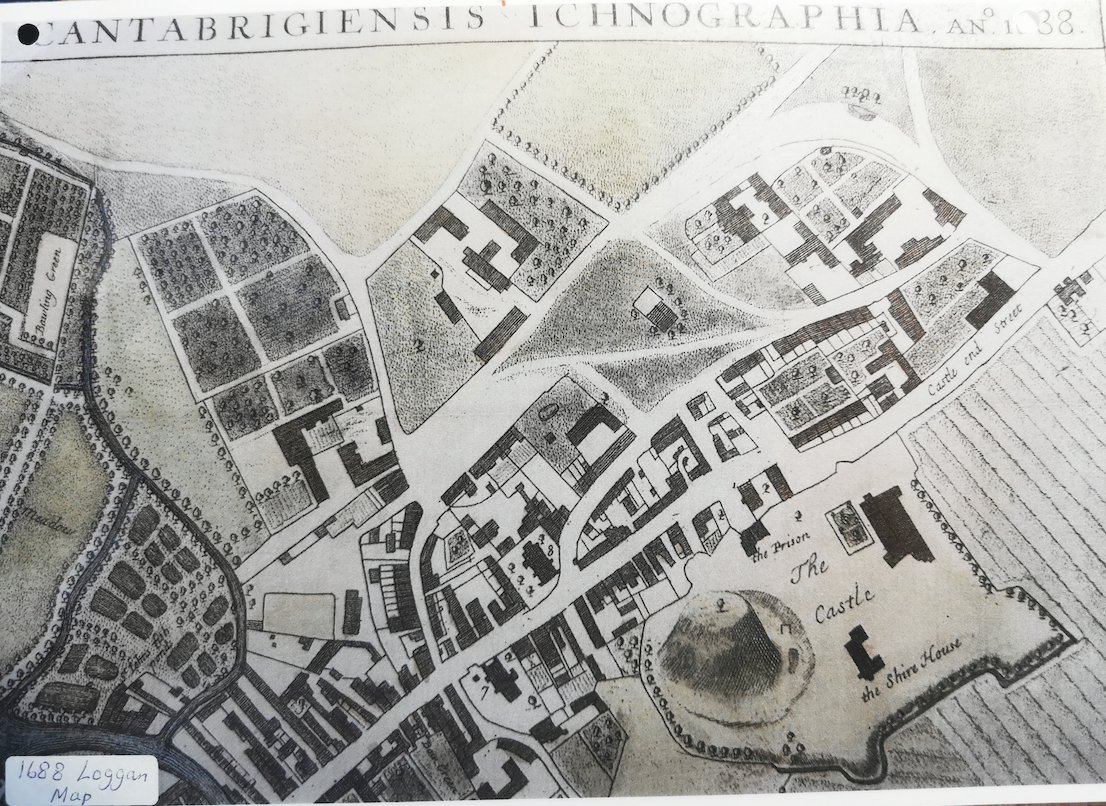
Historical map
