= Enid Porter =

Enid Mary Porter (8 October 1908 – 16 January 1984) was a collector of folklore in Cambridgeshire and the longest serving curator of the Cambridge & County Folk Museum, now the Museum of Cambridge, working from 1947 to 1976. Her work was invaluable in recording the cultural and social practices of people in Cambridgeshire; she was innovative in the discipline of social history collection, employing working practices such as oral history, and engaging with people in areas that had previously been overlooked by folklorists. Her notebooks, now in possession of the Museum of Cambridge, hold a treasure-trove of information about Cambridgeshire customs, stories and songs.

== Early life ==
Enid Mary Porter was born on 8 October 1908 in Westcliff-on-Sea, Essex, to father Hugh Porter and mother Ethel Mary Porter. Her father Hugh, originally from Bedford, completed his teacher training at a higher-grade school in Cambridge before becoming a secondary master at Southend High School. Her mother, Ethel Mary (née Scott), was from a family which could trace its roots in Cambridge as far back as the seventeenth century. As a result, Enid regularly visited relatives in the city of Cambridge and knew the area well. In her later career she would record local lore gleaned from her Cambridgeshire family. The Porter family was of the professional middle class and employed a servant until the First World War.

After obtaining a degree in modern languages at University College London (which at this time housed the Folklore Society library, deposited in 1911), Enid followed her father and trained as a teacher at the Catholic Training College, London before working in schools for some years until after the Second World War. Her true interests however, lay outside teaching, and seeing a staff vacancy advertised at the Cambridge and County Folk Museum in 1947, she applied and was appointed Assistant Curator in September of that year.

== Career ==
=== Curatorship at the Museum of Cambridge ===
The museum grew out of the 1934 ‘Festival of Olden Times’ hosted by the Cambridge Guildhall and organised by Catherine Parsons, the then chair of the Cambridgeshire Women's Institute. The Museum was formed in 1936 by members of the local Rotary Club and University of Cambridge, in the site of the abandoned White Horse Inn; the museum occupies the same site today. The original aim of the museum was ‘to collect and preserve for the benefit of the general public and for the purposes of education, objects of local interest and common use’. During the official opening of the museum, Sir Cyril Fox proclaimed ‘I am inclined to think that in the University of Cambridge there is more exact knowledge of the social anthropology of, let us say, Papua than of Pampisford’; the Museum of Cambridge has retained its original purpose to collect, preserve and educate the public about a history of Cambridgeshire, separate from the university.

Enid Porter was appointed assistant curator under honorary curator Thomas Wyatt Bagshawe in 1947 and became full curator in 1950, living in rooms connected to the old Inn. The museum was in a poor financial position surviving on a combination of subscriptions, donations, admission fees (3d for children and 6d for adults). Enid worked as ticket collector and cleaner, as well as curator; in 1965, she only earned £8 a week and had not had a pay rise in fifteen years. During the 1960s, Porter had transformed the museum into a community hub and visitor numbers steadily rose throughout the decade. Enid's health began to decline in the 1960s and she retired in 1974 after a series of heart attacks.

=== Collection of folklore ===
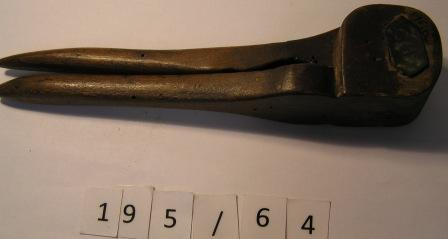
Wooden Nutcracker, handmade in Ely in the late 18th century. Purchased by Enid Porter at a sale by auction on 7 & 8 April 1964, Drill Hall, Ely.

The collection of the Cambridge & County Folk Museum grew vastly during Enid Porter's curatorship; she accepted donations and regularly went to auctions to buy items for the museum. The museum's collection now comprises over 20,000 objects not including Porter's personal notebooks. These notebooks contained copies of historical documents, newspaper articles and trade directories that she used to track movements of individuals, businesses and buildings. Porter's notebooks are also home to accounts of numerous encounters with people she met during her professional life, detailing certain folk customs and superstitions and song lyrics. Some of her notes and transcriptions have been digitised by the Enid Porter Project run by the Museum of Cambridge and can be seen on the project website.

Her collecting of material in the Isle of Ely, the rural northern areas of Cambridgeshire, part of The Fens, brought her into contact with Walter Henry (Jack) Barrett (1891-1974) with whom she published Tales from the Fens (1963), More Tales from the Fens (1964) and A Fenman's Story (1965). Another was Arthur Redvers Randell with whom she published Sixty Years a Fenman and Fenland Railwayman. Porter was awarded The Coote Lake Medal by the Folklore Society in 1968.

Years before a methodology was standardised for oral history collection, Porter engaged with people from all over the region, collecting stories, anecdotes and valuable personal feelings and impressions of interviewees. Porter preferred to use her notebooks as she felt that contemporary recording equipment affected the interviewees negatively and spoilt the material. Although some of these methods would have been considered unempirical by academic historians, they were recognised when the University of Cambridge awarded her an honorary MA in 1972, followed by the same award from the Open University in 1980. In 2015 a Cambridge blue plaque bearing her name was installed at the Museum of Cambridge.

== Personal philosophy ==
Enid Porter was influential within the museums movement of the 1960s which aimed to widen museum attendance and to discourage elitist tendencies in the sector. She gave talks about local history to all sorts of groups and published articles in Cambridgeshire, Huntingdon & Peterborough Life magazine. Porter never missed an opportunity, and even took note of conversations she held when she was in hospital for her own health, sharing stories and anecdotes with other patients nearby. These methods of collection are a consequence of the key philosophy that she thanks her predecessor Thomas Bagshawe for; the importance of going out to collect information rather than sitting and waiting for it to be brought to the museum or the curator. Enid Porter worked using a multi-disciplinary method in her collection of folklore, social history and community life. She wrote that ‘Just as no man is an island unto himself, no academic discipline should, or can, remain in isolation’.

== Works ==
- Tales from the Fens (London: Routledge, & Kegan Paul, 1963) - W.H. Barrett, edited by Enid Porter
- More Tales from the Fens (London: Routledge, & Kegan Paul, 1964) - W.H. Barrett, edited by Enid Porter
- A Fenman's Story (London: Routledge, & Kegan Paul, 1965) - W.H. Barrett, edited by Enid Porter
- Sixty Years a Fenman (London Routledge & Kegan Paul, 1966) - Arthur Randell, edited by Enid Porter
- Fenland Railwayman (London Routledge & Kegan Paul, 1968) - Arthur Randell, edited by Enid Porter
- Fenland Memories (London Routledge & Kegan Paul, 1969) - Arthur Randell, edited by Enid Porter
- Victorian Cambridge (Dobson, 1969)
- Cambridgeshire Customs & Folklore (London: Routledge & Kegan Paul, 1969)
- Fenland Molecatcher (London Routledge & Kegan Paul, 1970) - Arthur Randell, edited by Enid Porter
- The Hearth and the Kitchen (Cambridge & County Folk Museum, 1971)
- The Folklore of East Anglia (London: B.T. Batesford, 1974)
- Victorian Cambridge: Josiah Chater's Diaries, 1844-83 (Phillimore & Co., 1975)
