= Spittals Interchange =

Coordinates: 52.3401°N 0.2087°W

Spittals Interchange is the roundabout on the junction between the A141 and A1307 north of Huntingdon, England.

The junction is unusual in that pre 2020 three arms of this four-way junction were numbered A14. The "extra" route exits to the north and is a four-mile spur that joins the northbound A1(M). The north-east A1307 passes under the roundabout, but the west-east A141 traffic, which is the majority, must enter the roundabout.

Traffic lights were added in 2006 in an attempt to reduce the number of accidents and improve traffic flow.

The word spital or spittal in this context itself derives from 'hospital', in the sense of hospitality or shelter, as almshouses were originally known. In this case the 'spital' in question is St Margaret's Hospital, which owned land to the north of Huntingdon in medieval times. In addition until the 20th century there were almshouses called The Spitals situated on Ermine Street where the present A141 now crosses it.
