= Huntingdon Road =

Road in Cambridge, UK

Coordinates: 52°13′38″N 0°05′03″E

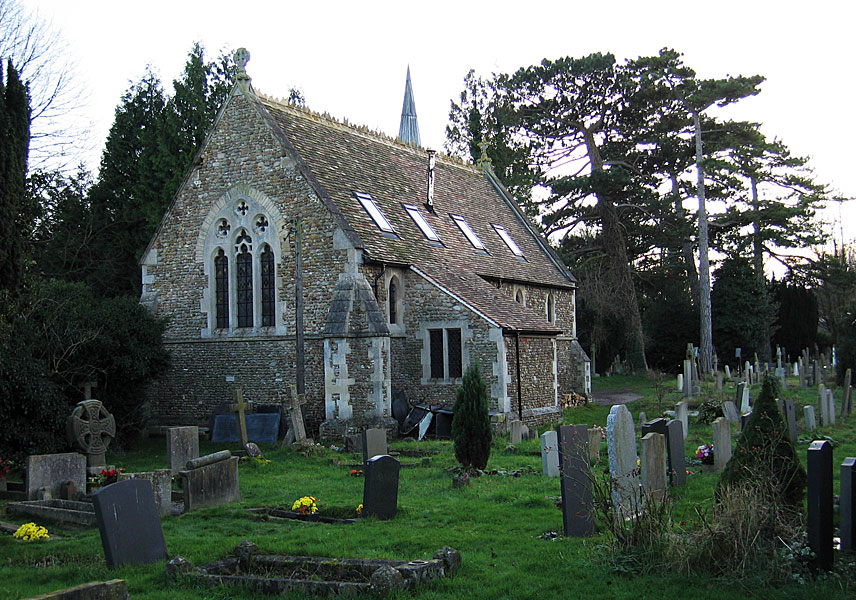
The chapel of the Ascension Parish Burial Ground, off Huntingdon Road.

Huntingdon Road is a major arterial road linking central Cambridge, England with Junction 14 of the M11 motorway and the A14 northwest from the city centre. The road, designated the A1307, follows the route of the Roman Via Devana, and is named after the town of Huntingdon, northwest of Cambridge.

At the southeastern end, the road links with Histon Road (B1049), Victoria Road (A1134) and Mount Pleasant. It continues as Castle Street, then Magdalene Street over the River Cam and Bridge Street, into the centre of the city.

The University of Cambridge colleges Fitzwilliam College (front entrance on Storey's Way, south off Huntingdon Road), Girton College, Murray Edwards College (formerly New Hall), and St Edmund’s College (front entrance on Mount Pleasant), are located off the road. Girton College is some distance from central Cambridge as a former women's college, just south of the village of Girton.

Also on the road are:

- Ascension Parish Burial Ground, where many Cambridge academics are buried
- Cambridge Seed Testing Station
- Cambridge Genetics Station
- Trinity Hall Sports Ground
- The National Institute of Agricultural Botany (NIAB)
- Number 173 Huntingdon Road is 'the Kaptiza House', build by Pyotr Kapitsa, the Soviet physicist and Nobel laureate
- The northern access to Eddington, a new settlement under construction by the university

== In popular culture ==
Huntingdon Road features prominently in the 1990 short story "The Fenstanton Witch" by M. R. James.

== Gallery ==
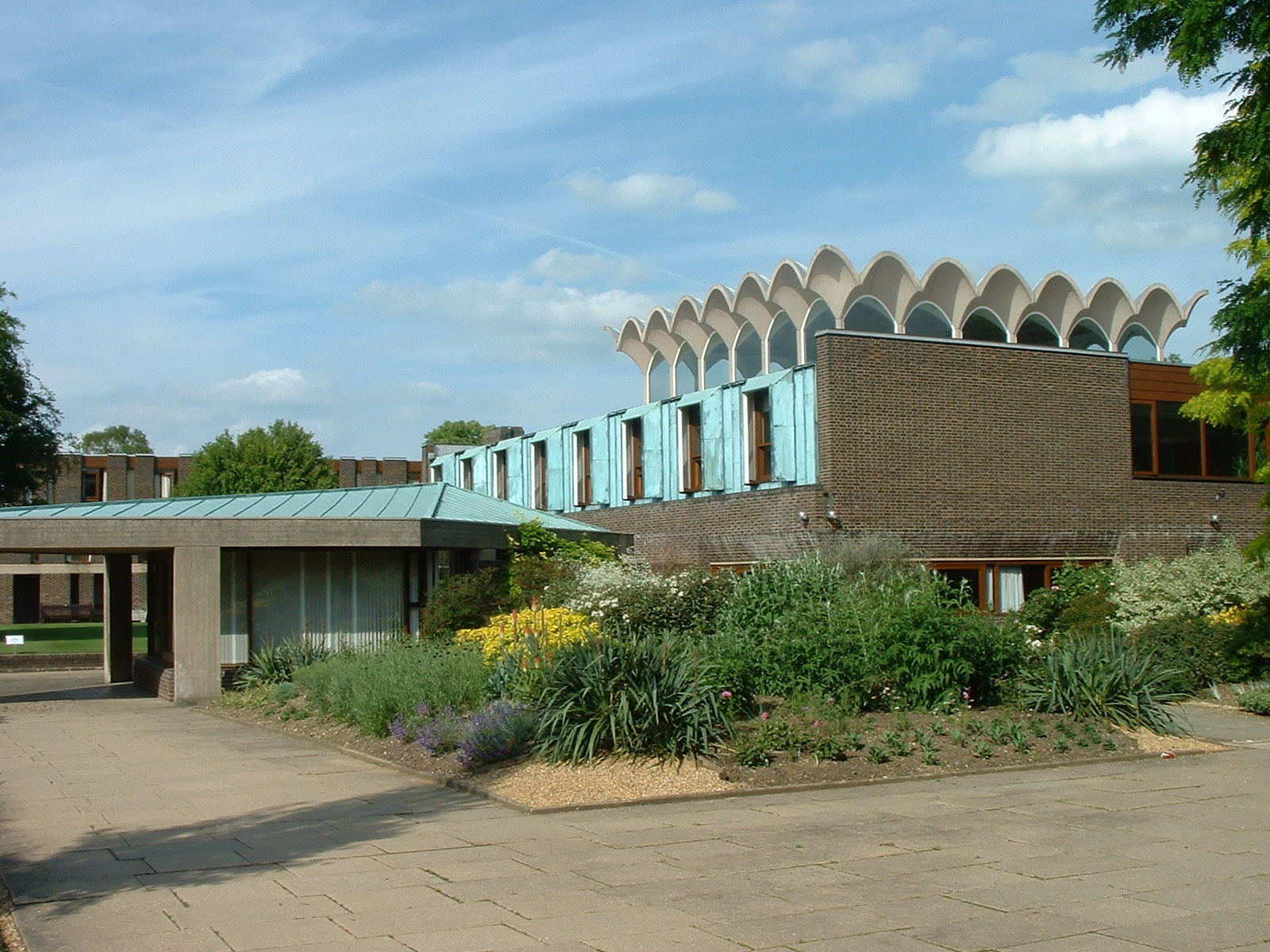
Main hall of Fitzwilliam College at the southeast end of Huntingdon Road.

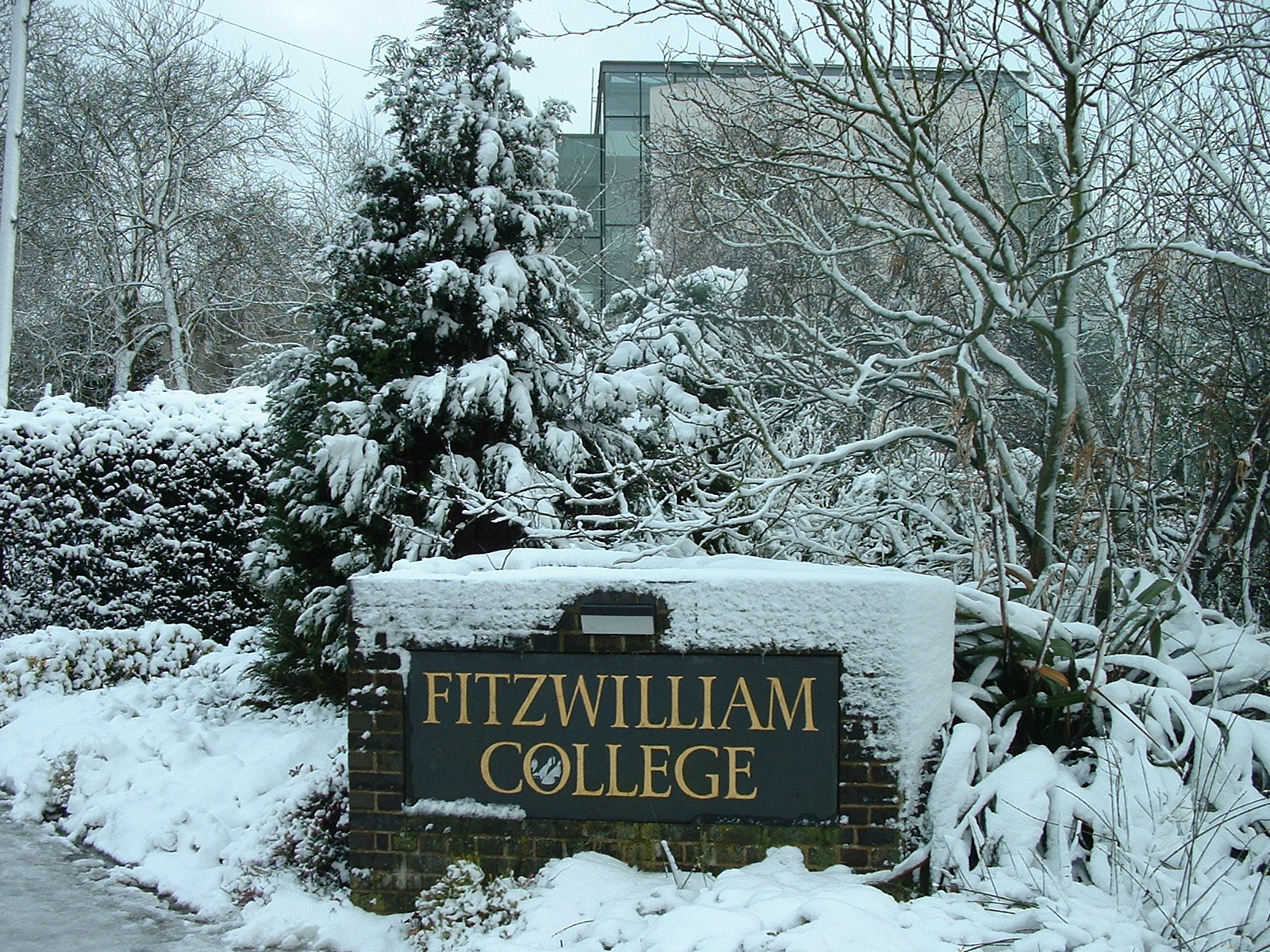
Fitzwilliam College sign on Huntingdon Road (removed to make way for building works, May 2008).

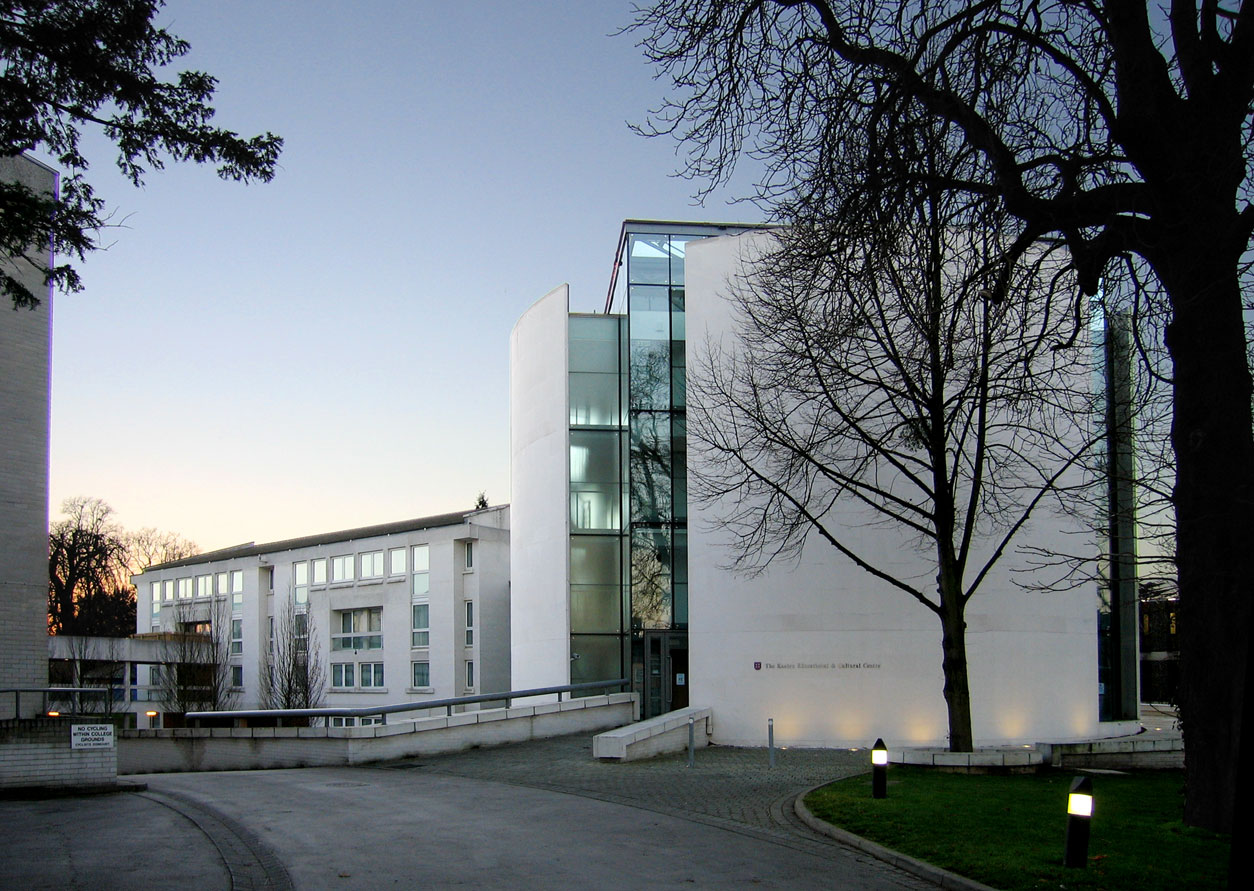
Kaetsu Centre of Murray Edwards College, on the Huntingdon Road, also at the southeast end.

== See also ==
- Huntingdon, a market town in Cambridgeshire, northwest of Cambridge
- Howes, a former hamlet on Huntingdon Road
- Emma Darwin (1808–1896), widow of Charles Darwin, wintered at 'The Grove' on Huntingdon Road from 1882
- Francis Darwin (1848–1925), lived at 'Wychfield' on Huntingdon Road
- Horace Darwin (1851–1928), lived at 'The Orchard' on Huntingdon Road
