= Mary Farmer =

UK based weaver of tapestries and rugs

- Farmer around age 20
- Born: 6 August 1940; Newbury, Berkshire, England
- Died: 1 February 2021 (aged 80); Boston, Lincolnshire, England
- Education: Sydenham High School, Beckenham School of Art
- Spouse: Terry Moores (1949–2014)
- Website: ArtFacts Profile

Mary Farmer (6 August 1940 – 1 February 2021) was a UK-based weaver of tapestries and rugs, she led developments in tapestry in the late 20th century with a number of roles across higher education culminating in Course Director at the Royal College of Art. Her client list included royalty, government departments, major corporations, museum collections and private collectors.

A 2023 Government Art Collection posthumous reception featured her work, both with the tapestry Buzz On at the reception by Admiralty Arch, London and a collection of works by audio visual presentation. The Tapestry Buzz On is now (2024) at the Foreign, Commonwealth and Development Office, Whitehall and the other two commissioned works in this series, Buzz on II and Buzz On III moved to the British Embassy in Rome, Italy in 2023. An early rug, together with a contemporary tapestry are in the collection of the Victoria and Albert Museum.

== Early life ==
Mary Farmer was born Mary Quinton Farmer on 6 August 1940 in Newbury, Berkshire, to Edith Anona Jane Farmer (née Quinton),and Seldon Charles Forrester Farmer, Principal Probation Officer for Berkshire Probation Service and latterly Inner London Probation Service's longest serving Principal Probation Officer. Farmer's family relocated to Beckenham, Kent in 1948/9.

It has become evident during this research that her mother was also an accomplished Lacemaking, Dressmaking and Weaving artist being a member of the London Guild of Weavers, Spinners and Dyers from shortly after its inception to the mid 1980s. However unlike her daughter most of this was known locally rather than internationally.

=== Education ===
Mary Farmer's Secondary education was at Sydenham High School. with Further Education at Beckenham School of Art (1958–1961).

== Music ==
Mary Farmer was an accomplished flautist, playing flute for the Ernest Read London Junior Orchestra from 1957 to 1960. By the end of 1960 she had made her career choice in the Visual Arts.

=== Known Concerts ===
Ernest Reed Concerts
The London Junior Orchestra at Royal Academy of Music The Duke's Hall	The London Junior and Senior Orchestra at Royal Festival Hall |
29 November 1957	30 May 1958
28 November 1958	27 May 1959
11 December 1959	26 May 1960
25 November 1960	

== Visual Arts Career ==
Farmer's career in the Visual arts began at Beckenham School of Art (1958–61) where she initially focused on painting. However, she went on to be trained in rug weaving with Gwen and Barbara Mullins at Graffham Weavers, combined with part-time study at Farnham and Reigate Art Schools.

=== Establishment of weaving studio ===
She moved to Digswell House, Welwyn Garden City, Hertfordshire in 1964 and to Guildford, Surrey in 1967, combining home life and work studio from this point forward. However it was not till her move to Boston, Lincolnshire that her studio and workshop could really focus on her work with less constraints due to its design as a commercial building with an area converted for living accommodation, rather than the other way round. Farmer was awarded a Digswell Arts Trust Fellowship (1964–1967), a residency programme established in Hertfordshire by Henry Morris and artist potter Hans Coper.

=== Early career ===
One of her first major commissions was a multi-segment rug (2.75m x 2.75m) for the Ambassador's residence at the British Embassy in Paris, France in 1966. The cine film recording that production process was digitally transferred from the original silent Super 8 film.

From the late 1960s through to around 1981, she taught at an undergraduate level, predominantly at West Surrey College of Art and Design, Farnham, Surrey, but also Ravensbourne College of Art and Design, Bromley, Kent and Liverpool Art School amongst others.

Her early career saw she major exhibition tours (see below, but also the attention of private Gallery owners such as Henry Rothschild with inclusion at Primavera Gallery in 1965-6 and Joan Crossley-Holland at the Oxford Gallery from its establishment in 1968, intermittently through most of her career. Farmer regularly showed works at the British Crafts Centre and Northern Crafts Centre, including with the Red Rose Guild.

Following her marriage to ceramicist Terry Moores they established a joint workshop and home in Boston, Lincolnshire.

After a brief use of her married name, she formally registered Mary Farmer as a business name.

=== Royal College of Art ===
Farmer was appointed Tutor in Post-Graduate Textiles at the Royal College of Art in 1981, later being promoted to Course Leader, Tapestry. She oversaw the move into School of Fine Art in 1985, and later as Course Director of MA Tapestry until 1995. Several of her students went on to successful careers of their own including Jennie Moncur, Jeni Ross, Philip Sanderson, and Jun Tomita (specifically known for Japanese Kasuri weaving).

She was awarded a Fellowship in 1988 and Honorary Fellowship of the Royal College of Art in 1995, at the point of her retirement and the tapestry course closure.

=== Career outside academia ===
Throughout her academic career she was active in the art and craft of weaving rugs, tapestries and tapestry woven rugs. Many of these were shown around the world. Solo show, show with her partner ceramicist Terry Moores whose later works reached towards abstract sculptures, and group shows with or selected by many of the leading lights in the world of arts and crafts. Her work has been selected to adorn the catalogues of Sotheby's, Christie's and most recently Lyon & Turnbull.

=== Memberships ===
- Contemporary Applied Arts previously British Crafts Centre and Crafts Centre of Great Britain
  - Council of Management Contemporary Applied Arts
- Crafts Council
  - Grants & Loans Committee
  - Index Selection Committee
  - Exhibition Committee
  - Bursary Selection Committee
  - Appointed Member of Council Education Committee in 1988
- Lambeth Palace Chapel & Crypt Restoration Programme
  - Consultant Member of Chapel Advisory Group
- Fibre arts
- Red Rose Guild
- Guild of Weavers, Spinners and Dyers
  - London Guild of Weavers, Spinners and Dyers (February 1963 to February 1967)
  - Member of Editorial Committee of Quarterly Journal of the Association of Guilds of Weavers, Spinners and Dyers from 1964 - 1966
- Society of Designer Craftsmen
- Southern Arts Association
  - Committee Member

=== Major exhibitions and shows ===
Details of the majority of known and verified exhibitions can be found on the ArtFacts.Net website.

==== Mary Farmer exhibition timeline ====
Mary Farmers work was incorporated in over 250 exhibitions, so only ones significant to her career are shown here. This included several landmark tours by internationally renowned institutions. More detail can be found in a Timeline created in association with the 2024 exhibition Mary Farmer: A life in Tapestry.

Date	Title	Venue(s)
1960s	Early Career	
1965	Twelve Artists – Exhibition of Painting, Sculpture, Print making, Stained Glass, Weaving, Ceramics	Trade Union Congress Building, Great Russell Street, London
1965 - 7	Weaving for Walls	Victoria and Albert Museum, London, touring exhibition
1965	Viewpoint 1965	Primavera Gallery
1965	Christmas Exhibition and visit by HRH Prince Philip, Duke of Edinburgh and sale of 2 rugs to the Duke	Crafts Centre of Great Britain, London
1966	Artists from Digswell	Primavera Gallery
1969–71	British Designer Craftsmen Organised by UK Crafts Council / World Crafts Council. Patron: HRH Prince Philip, Duke of Edinburgh	Circulated by the Smithsonian Institution: Opening at Arts and Industries Building (AIB), Washington DC then tour to multiple venues across the US and Canada
1970s	West Surrey	
1977	Rugs for Churches Commission of kneelers for Liverpool Cathedral	Crafts Advisory Committee Gallery, 12 Waterloo Place, London, England and: The National Theatre Foyers, South Bank, London, England
1979	Hand-woven Tapestries and Rugs	Newbury Spring Festival, Newbury, Berkshire, England
1979	Mary Farmer Solo Exhibition	Connaught Gallery, Cranleigh School, Cranleigh, Surrey, England
1979	Mary Farmer: Tapestries, Rugs, Carpets Solo Exhibition	South Hill Park Arts Centre, Bracknell, Berkshire, England
1979-80	Weaving by Mary Farmer Solo Exhibition	Haslemere Museum, Haslemere, Surrey, England
1980s	Lincolnshire	Head of Tapestry at Royal College of Art
1980	Weaving by Mary Farmer Solo Exhibition	Farnham Maltings, Farnham, Surrey, England
1981	Textiles Today selected by Marianne Straub	Kettles Yard, Cambridge, England and tour
1981–2	Contemporary British Tapestry	Sainsbury Centre for Visual Arts, University of East Anglia, Norwich, Norfolk, England and tour
1982	The Maker's Eye (selector and exhibitor)	Crafts Council Gallery, London, England
1982	Textiles and Pottery	Wells Centre, Wells-next-the-Sea, Norfolk, England
1983-5	A closer look at rugs	Crafts Council Gallery, London, England and tour
1985	Tapestries by Mary Farmer, Ceramics by Terry Moores	British Crafts Centre, Earlham Street, London, England
1985	A Collection in the Making	Crafts Council Gallery, London, England
1985	Eight Contemporary Textile Artists from England Organised by Peter Shahbenderian and the Galerie Filambule	Galerie Filambule, Lausanne, Switzerland
1987-8	Wall to Wall – Textiles for Interiors	Cornerhouse, Manchester, England and tour
1990s	Lincolnshire	Head of Tapestry at Royal College of Art till Course Closure
1991	Contemporary English Crafts	Whitman College - Sheehan Gallery, Washington, USA and tour
1996–7	Woven Image - Contemporary British Tapestry	Barbican Centre, London, England and tour
1997	Made by Women	Portsmouth Museum and Art Gallery
2000s	Lincolnshire	
2003 - 2021	Contemporary Craft Gallery	Hove Museum of Creativity, Hove, England
2019 - 2020	Moving forward: the Crafts Study Centre at 50	Crafts Study Centre, Farnham, Surrey, England
2020 -1	The Crafts Study Centre at 50 - Remix	Crafts Study Centre, Farnham, Surrey, England
1 Feb 2021	Death	Following exhibitions were held posthumously
2021 - 2024	Contemporary Craft Gallery	Hove Museum of Creativity, Hove, England
2021	Maker's Eye: Stories of Craft	Crafts Council Gallery, London, England
2024	Mary Farmer: A Life in Tapestry Solo Exhibition	Crafts Study Centre, University for the Creative Arts, Farnham, Surrey, England
2024	Living in a Material World	Lyon & Turnbull, 22 Connaught Street, London, W2 2AF in collaboration with the Crafts Study Centre, Farnham, Surrey, England
2024 (remains Ongoing)	Contemporary Craft Gallery, all Mary Farmer Collection artworks now displayed including a rare video of her working (c1965)	Hove Museum of Creativity, Hove, England
2025 - 6	Picking up the Thread: the Past, Present and Future of Tapestry (The British Tapestry Group 20th Anniversary Exhibitions)	Invited Artist to the following venues: Dovecot Studios, Edinburgh (20 October 2025 - 14 February 2026); Morley Gallery, London (22 - 25 July 2026)
2026	Crafts Council Collect 2026 Art Fair with Oxford Ceramics Gallery	Somerset House, London, England (25 February - 1 March 2026)
2026	Textiles Today? Exhibitors: Jo Barker, Mary Farmer, Amber Fry, Jacob Monk, Eleanor Pritchard, Mary Restieaux, Ann Sutton, Jun Tomita	Fen Ditton Gallery, Fen Ditton, Cambridgeshire, England

=== Major award nominations and awards ===
Date	Title	Body or location
1964	Digswell Arts Trust Fellowship award	Digswell House, Welwyn Garden City, Hertfordshire, England
1988	Sotheby's Decorative Arts award nomination The catalogue features Tapestry – Soft Flight on the front cover	Sotheby's, London
1988	Fellowship of Royal College or Art (FRCA)	Royal College of Art, London, England
1995	Honorary Fellowship award	Royal College of Art, London, England
2024	The Warehouse at 50 High Street, Boston, Lincolnshire and the contribution of Farmer and Terry Moores to their respective fields as designer craftspeople has been recognised	Boston Preservation Trust's Blue Plaque scheme.

=== External examiner ===
- Middlesex Polytechnic: BA (Hons) Tapestry
- Liverpool Polytechnic: BA (Hons) Fine Art (Painting)
- West Dean College: Advanced Diploma Course in Tapestry

=== Later career ===
In 1990 Farmer suffered a severe shoulder injury which significantly curtailed her weaving career.

The MA Tapestry Course at the Royal College of Art closed in 1995 and Farmer went into retirement after over a decade of the challenging situation with the course's sustainability.

=== Works in public collections ===
- Brighton and Hove Museums, Sussex, three tapestries on long term display at Hove Museum of Creativity, (formerly in South East Arts Association Craft Collection)
  - Tapestries Give the Slip 1 and Give the Slip 2
  - Tapestry Red Letter
- Contemporary Art Society, London, England (formerly Crown Wallcoverings Ltd Collection)
  - Tapestry In the Blue (location currently unknown)
- Crafts Council Collection, London
  - Tapestry Bright Side
  - Tapestry Black Mass
  - Rug 5H
- Crafts Study Centre, Farnham, Surrey
  - Tapestry Penumbra
  - Miniature Tapestry Flash Back 3
  - Tapestry Blue Heaven
  - Tapestry Silent Night
  - Kneeler sample and design from the Rugs for Churches commission for Liverpool Cathedral
- Government Art Collection, London
  - Tapestry Buzz On
  - Tapestry Buzz On II
  - Tapestry Buzz On III
- Oxford Education Committee (work and location unknown)
- Oxfordshire Museum, (formerly in Southern Arts Association Collection)
  - Tapestry Clanger
- Portsmouth Museum and Art Gallery, (formerly in Contemporary Art Society collection)
  - Tapestry Tip-Off
- The late HRH Prince Philip, Duke of Edinburgh
- Sainsbury Centre, Norwich
  - Tapestry Deep Heat
  - Tapestry Turn Up
- Victoria and Albert Museum, London
  - Rug Quadruple and Three'
  - Tapestry Soft Flight
- The Wilson (Cheltenham)
  - Rug Hover (formerly in Contemporary Art Society collection)

=== Works in corporate collections ===
- Channel 4 Television Company Ltd
- National Bank of America, City of London
  - Tapestry Void
  - Tapestry Volume
- British Oxygen Company
- Pace Petroleum

== Later personal life and death ==
Her husband, Terry Moores, died in 2014.

Mary Farmer remained largely independent into later life; however, she suffered acute illness during the COVID-19 pandemic and died on 1 February 2021 in Boston, Lincolnshire.

== Legacy ==
Ann Sutton made a number of pieces of her collection available in the Modern Made auction in 2023, including a significant piece, the tapestry, Float 1) by Farmer. Interest in the work and contribution that Farmer made to art in the late 20th century.

A reception was held in November 2023 at the Government Art Collection adjacent to Admiralty Arch as a memorial to Farmer, featuring the Tapestry Buzz On which has been in their collection since 1977. Whilst exposure of these pieces is normally limited to government, diplomats and their staff, with a piece currently at Foreign, Commonwealth & Development Office, Whitehall, London and the other two at the British Embassy in Rome, Italy. However, their viewing was restricted to GCHQ, Cheltenham staff from 2011 to 2019 and whilst viewing may have been restricted, their presence did not escape The Times, although they attributed them to the wrong Mary Farmer.

Renewed recognition has been evident since her death with a major solo exhibition at the Crafts Study Centre in 2024. 2025/6 she was an invited artist as part of The British Tapestry Group 20th Anniversary celebration. The Victoria and Albert Museum have acquired the tapestry Soft Flight, a major piece reserved for many major exhibitions internationally during her lifetime.. In 2026 the Oxford Ceramics Gallery included one of Mary Farmer's pieces in the Crafts Council Collect Art Fair at Somerset House.
