= British Designer Craftsmen =

British craftspeople exhibition

Smithsonian Institution

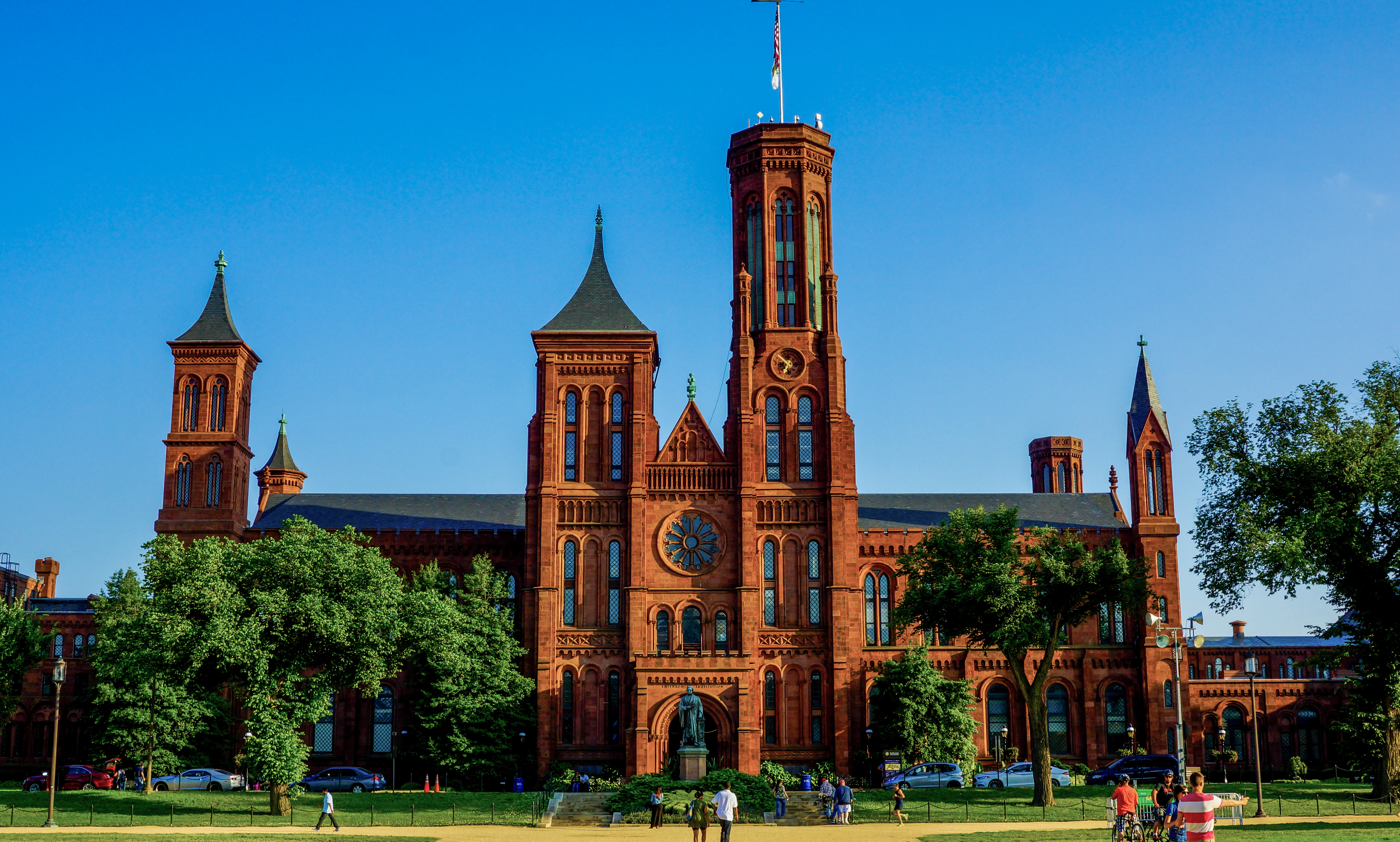
- The Smithsonian Institution Building in Washington, D.C., also known as "the Castle"

British Designer Craftsmen was an exhibition of British craftsmen and craftswomen organised by UK Crafts Council and World Crafts Council with HRH Prince Philip, Duke of Edinburgh as Patron

== Exhibition tour locations ==
It was circulated by the Smithsonian Institution to multiple venues across the United States of America and Canada from 1969 to 1971.

- Arts and Industries Building (AIB), Washington DC
- DeCordova Sculpture Park and Museum, Lincoln, MA
- Birmingham Museum of Art, Birmingham, Alabama
- The Arts Centre, Miami, FL
- Cranbrook Art Museum, Bloomfield Hills, MI
- Birmingham Bloomfield Art Center (BBAC), Birmingham, MI
- Berkshire Museum, Pittsfield, MA
- Saginaw Art Museum. Saginaw, MI
- Cleveland Institute of Art, Cleveland, OH
- Winnipeg Art Gallery (WAG), Canada
- Philadelphia Museum of Art
- Hunter Museum of American Art, Chattanooga, TN
- College of Marin Art Gallery, Novato, CA
- Arkansas Museum of Fine Arts, Little Rock, AR
- Chrysler Museum of Art, Norfolk, VA
- Glenbow Museum, Calgary, AB, Canada
- Mobile Museum of Art, Mobile, AL
- Virginia, Bristol, VA

== Participants ==
The confirmed participants in this exhibition tour are shown below. They include many of the leading designer craftsmen of the era.

- Lucie Aldridge
- Brian Asquith
- Ian Auld
- Richard Batterham
- Gerald Benney
- Tadek Beutlich
- Richard Box
- Andrew Bray
- Joan Brown
- Ann-marie Butler
- Michael Caddy
- Alan Caiger-Smith
- James Campbell
- Michael Casson
- John Chalke
- Kenneth Clark
- Urol Stanho Cohen
- Harold Cohen
- Tarquin Cole
- Peter Collingwood
- Joanna Constantinidis
- Hans Coper
- Barbara Dawson
- Marianne De Trey
- Beryl Dean
- Robert Dodd
- Ruth Duckworth
- Noel Dyrenforth
- Mary Farmer
- Raymond Finch
- David Bernard Frost
- Samuel J. German
- Wilfred Gibson
- Janet Graham
- Jennifer Gray
- Tim Green
- Louise Grose
- Gwyn Hanssen
- Neil Harding
- Anthony Hepburn
- Samuel J Herman
- Constance Mildred Howard
- John Hutton
- Walter Keeler
- David Kindersley
- Tony Laws
- David Leach (potter)
- Janet Leach
- Bernard Leach
- Gillian Lowndes
- Robert Mabon
- John Makepeace
- Brian Roberts Marshall
- David Mellor
- Vicky Mockett
- Barbara Mullins
- Gwen Mullins
- Bryan Newman
- Heather Padfield
- David Peace
- Colin Pearson
- William Frederick Plunkett
- Keith Redfern
- Ceri Richards
- Lucie Rie
- Pat Russell
- Barbara Sawyer
- Valerie Searle
- Derek Simpson
- Sam Smith
- Humphrey Spender
- Marianne Straub
- Harold Summers
- Margaret Traherne
- Helen Turner-Monro
- Peter Tysoe
- Keith Tyssen
- Keith Vaughan
- Alan Wallwork
- Robert Welch
- Kathleen Whyte
