= Weaving for Walls =

1965-7 touring exhibition curated by Mary Blair

The Victoria and Albert Museum, London, England arranged the touring exhibition Weaving for Walls, curated by Mary Blair (Secretary of the Association of Guilds of Weavers, Spinners and Dyers) and which was toured between 1965 and 1967 across the United Kingdom, featuring many of the most prominent weavers of the time. It featured tapestries, hangings and rugs created using a variety of techniques.

== Known Participants ==
- Dorothy Ablett
- Cicely Mary Barker
- Tadek Beutlich 1922
- Margaret Bowyer
- Hilda Breed
- Geraldine Carmichael
- Peter Collingwood
- Mary Dodman
- Winifred Evans
- Mary Farmer
- Ronald Grierson
- Maud Hamberg
- Norma Harvey
- Patricia Holtom
- Ruth Hurle
- Eta Ingram-Mohrhardt
- Louise Littleton
- Constance Martin
- Kathleen Monk
- Theo Moorman
- Barbara Mullins
- Gwen Mullins
- Enid Russ (V&A only)
- Barbara Sawyer
- Margaret Seagroatt
- Constance Spreadbury
- Lorna Steadman
- Ann Sutton
- Patricia Tindale
- Marjorie Williams
- Lore Youngmark

== Exhibition Locations ==
The opening of this major exhibition at the Victoria and Albert Museum was in April 1965, then circulating to many of the major museums and art galleries across the United Kingdom.

- Bethnal Green Museum
- Williamson Art Gallery and Museum, Birkenhead
- Cannon Hill Trust, now the Midlands Art Centre (MAC), Birmingham
- Bristol Museum and Art Gallery
- The Cooper Gallery, Barnsley
- Huddersfield Art Gallery
- Kelvingrove Art Gallery and Museum, Glasgow
- Kettering Museum and Art Gallery
- Leamington Spa Gallery and Museum
- National Museum Cardiff
- Reading Museum
- Stafford College of Art, The Oval, Stafford, England
- Walsall
- Wakefield Art Gallery
- Market Hall Museum, Warwick
