= Crafts Centre of Great Britain =

Organisation of British crafts people

- Formation: 1948; 78 years ago
- Defunct: 1972
- Type: Craft organisation
- Purpose: The preservation, promotion and improvement of fine craftsmanship in Great Britain
- Headquarters: Berkeley Square, London (1950-1967); Earlham Street, London (1967-1972)
- Region served: United Kingdom
- Leader: John Farleigh, CBE

The Crafts Centre of Great Britain was established in 1948 with the purpose of "the preservation, promotion and improvement of fine craftsmanship in Great Britain." It created direct links between individual producers and industry, and encouraged young people to take up crafts through education and instruction. Prominent members included Bernard Leach, Lilian Dring and Tibor Reich.

== History ==
In 1946 five societies – the Arts and Crafts Exhibition Society, the Red Rose Guild of Craftsmen, the Senefelder Club, the Society of Scribes and Illuminators and the Society of Wood Engravers – met at the Central School of Arts and Crafts to discuss forming a Craft Centre of Great Britain. The initial plan was to open an exhibition space at 98 Portland Place, but after "struggling for three years on private funds" a government grant made it possible to open a space at 16 Hay Hill, Berkeley Square in 1950. The centre was opened by the Queen on 16 August 1950, where she was presented with a silver spoon for her granddaughter, designed and made by Francis Cooper. The centre was opened to the public on 27 April 1950.

=== Funding and finances ===
A significant benefit for craftspeople who were members of the Crafts Centre of Great Britain was that they were exempted from purchase tax, which in 1948 was 66.66%.

In History of the Crafts Council (1994), Tanya Harrod observed that "the Crafts Centre had a chequered career, attributed in part to an 'unwieldly quarrelsome council representing five interest groups'." The Craft Centre’s finances were always precarious. It was initially funded by a three-year government grant, to cover rent and the hosting of exhibitions around the country. In 1953 the Craft Centre became a trading body as well as a showroom. In 1962 the government removed the Craft Centre’s annual £5,000 grant. In 1966 the Craft Centre received a £5,000 grant from the Board of Trade.

=== Venues ===
In 1950 an exhibition space was opened at Hay Hill, including an exhibition living room featuring a rotation of members' designs, together with a space for individual crafts. The centre also offered education and instruction. In 1967, the exhibition space moved to 43 Earlham Street, London. In 1970 Viscount Weymouth, heir to the Marquess of Bath, converted a "pin-table saloon" at Longleat House, Wiltshire, into a shop for the Craft Centre of Great Britain. Longleat Gallery was designed by Alan Irvine and was the Craft Centre's only permanent location outside London. Its posters were designed by Derek Birdsall. In the 1970s the Craft Centre also supported an arts fair held at Farnley Hall, West Yorkshire.

== Key people ==
- Chairman: John Farleigh was awarded a CBE for his work in establishing the Craft Centre
- Secretary-General: Evelyn Fahy
- President: Prince Philip
- Vice-president: Bernard Leach
- Chairman: Graham Hughes
- Director: Cyril Wood

== Crafts ==
The crafts supported by the Craft Centre included: bookbinding, calligraphy, domestic glass, embroidery, furniture, gold, jewellery, lace, lithography, pottery, silver, sun glass, textiles (printed and woven), typography and wood engraving. The Craft Centre "insisted on original design". It didn't include steel engraving, saddlery or gun making, which instead formed part of the Rural Industries Bureau.

== Exhibitions ==
The Craft Centre ran a continuous exhibition that shifted focus between different crafts throughout the year. A selection of exhibitions included:

Year	Craft / Exhibition	Artists
March 1950	Opening exhibition	
January 1951	Pottery	Bernard Leach, Margaret Leach
September 1951	Gold	Joe Woodward
November 1951	Calligraphy	
January 1952	Harpsichords, spinets and clavichords	
March 1952	Printing	Mural showing 6,000 year history of the art of printing
April 1954	Furniture and pottery	Paul Barron (potter), Hugh Birkett (furniture)
October 1954	Weaving	Gerd Hay-Edie, Monica Blyth
January 1955	Glass engraving	David Peace, Anthony Pope, Ernest Dinkel
May 1955	Jewellery	
October 1955	The first touring exhibition to Scotland	Carl Dolmetsch, Leslie Ward, Leslie Durbin, Krystyna Henneberg, Kathleen Heron, Bernard Leach, Katharine Pleydell-Bouverie, Robert Stone
February 1956	An exhibition at Leicester Museum & Art Gallery	
May 1956	Embroidery at Birmingham Museum and Art Gallery	
August 1956	Lithographs	Robert Tavener, Charles Keeping
October 1956	Illustrations	H M Adams, Edith Goodwin, Dorothy Hutton
December 1956	Christmas exhibition	Eric Clements, Anthony Hawkesley, Alan Knight, Hugh Birkett, Edward Gardiner, Raymond Finch
April 1957	Today’s Patron	Eric Clements, David Peace
October 1958	British Fine Crafts, Belfast Art College Association	Bernard Leach, Sydney Cockerell, Leslie Runkin, Irene Wellington, John Farleigh, Roger Powell, Barbara Hutton, Gerd Hay-Edie
February 1960	Opened by Duke of Edinburgh, at RIBA headquarters	Gerald Benney, Francis Cooper, Robert Stone
June 1960	Under Thirties	G D Robinson
September 1962	Exhibition of Weaving	Mary Farmer, Maud Jones, Barbara Mullins, Robin Welch
December 1965	Christmas exhibition	Opened by Prince Philip, Duke of Edinburgh; Derek Emms, Mary Farmer
December 1966	Christmas exhibition	Derek Emms, Bernard Leach
January 1968	Exports: Detroit USA	
February 1968	Skill at Goldsmith's Hall	In collaboration with the Institute of Directors
February 1969	Scottish design and craft	Visited by Queen Elizabeth, the Queen Mother
February 1970	Jewellery and silver	Fiona Fraser
June 1970	Furniture Exhibition 1970	Chester Jones
November - December 1970	Weaving and Pots	Gwen Mullins, Barbara Mullins, Emmanuel Cooper
December 1971	Joint Christmas crafts shop at the Design Council	

== Members ==
Craft Centre of Great Britain members included:

Craft	Member
Calligraphy and illumination	R J Croft, Claire Evans, Mervyn C Oliver
Embroidery	Hebe Cox, Barbara Dawson, Joy Dobbs (Clucas), Lilian Dring, Margaret T Holden-Jones
Furniture making	William Joyce
Glass engraving	Harold Gordon, Helen Monro Turner
Glass	Dillon Clarke, Stephen Rickard
Jewellery	Richard Brown, William Henry Brown, Owen Faulkner, Wendy Watkins, Guy Watson
Pottery	Graham Burr, Honorine Catto, Brian Dewbury, David Eeles, Robert Charles Privett Fournier, William Fishley Holland, Janet Hamer, Henry Hammond, James Hart, Joyce Haynes, Samuel J Herman, Janet Leach, William Marshall, Basil Matthews, William Newland, Colin Pearson, Helen Edith Pincombe, Lucie Rie, James Walford, Mary White
Sculptor	David Dewey
Silversmithing	Lois Betteridge, John Grenville, Paul Harrison
Weaving and textiles	Eileen Bradford, Mrs W Harcourt Brigden, Helen Brooks, Mrs Eugene Carter, Elsie G Davenport, Mary Farmer, Ronald Grierson, Gerd Hay-Edie, Annie Maile, Mair Morris, Tibor Reich, Robert Stewart

== Merge with the Crafts Council of Great Britain ==
In 1970, the Crafts Centre was struggling financially, its government funding having been removed. In 1972 the Crafts Centre merged with the Crafts Council of Great Britain to become the British Crafts Centre. Supported by a grant of £40,000 from the government's Crafts Advisory Committee (CAC), which had been established the previous year, the new organisation's offices were at Waterloo Place, London. The Crafts Centre's Earlham Street gallery location was retained for “one-man shows and other special displays”. In 1986 the organisation's name was changed to Contemporary Applied Arts, which remains active today.

== See also ==
Backemeyer, Sylvia Making their Mark: Art, Craft and Design at the Central School, 1896-1966 (2000) Pub. Herbert Press ISBN 978-0713652611
