= Sam Smith (toy-maker) =

Toy-maker

- At Kingswear in 1976 age 68
- Born: Alan Verner Smith; 27 July 1908; Shirley, Southampton, England
- Died: 9 February 1983 (aged 74); Newton Abbot, Devon, England
- Education: Victoria College, Jersey; Bournemouth School of Art; Westminster School of Art
- Known for: toy-maker, painter and sculptor
- Notable work: Tmith (1973); The Crew Cats (1975); Rover's Regatta Day (1977)
- Patrons: Muriel Rose; Henry Rothschild

Sam Smith (Alan Verner Smith, 1908–1983) was an artist, crafter and sculptor, known for his sculptures and toy-making for adults and children, carving wooden curios such as boats and seaside dioramas.

== Early life and education ==
Smith was born in Southampton on 27 July 1908. His father was a steamship captain. Smith attended Victoria College, Jersey. He studied art at Bournemouth School of Art and Westminster School of Art.

== Career ==
Art UK writes "A lonely, introspective child, he "always wanted to be an artist", went to art school, but the 1930s Depression meant that he had to become a handyman and advertising illustrator". He was unsuccessful as a painter.

He started to carve and make wooden toys whilst working at an art gallery in London, and these were sold in the gallery shop.

During the Second World War, Smith worked as a draughtsman, for instance producing technical drawings for the development of the Bailey Bridge in Christchurch, Dorset.

His wooden toys were shown at the Royal Festival Hall following the war. "Smith’s objects became bigger, more elaborate and less toy-like, based on childhood memories and colourful characters, witty but a stringent comments on society." The Victoria and Albert Museum says that "His work has been described as "sculpture toys for grown-ups" ... by the 1970s they had become quite large, with unusual themes".

After the war, he, his wife Gladys, and stepson lived in a steep-hillside house, The Golf House, overlooking Kingswear, Devon, and across the River Dart to Dartmouth. For making toys, Smith had many wood-cutting tools in his studio in their house. They moved from Kingswear to Newton Abbot, Devon in 1979, where he continued to create work in his studio.

A film about Smith, Sam Smith: Genuine England, was made by the Arts Council of Great Britain in 1976, and broadcast by BBC Two on Arena.

Smith continued to be successful in the United States of America with less of a reputation in the UK until Bristol Museum & Art Gallery held a large-scale exhibition in 1972. In 1981 the Serpentine Gallery had a joint exhibition with H. C. Westermann, an American artist who was a friend of his. During this exhibition Smith suffered a stroke. This was his last show. He died in 1983.

He signed much of his 1930s work "Alan V". Later, he signed items "Sam Smith, Genuine England" as he became successful and sold work in London (for instance at the Primavera Gallery) and New York.

Southampton City Art Gallery holds some of his work, including his painting Bathers in Southampton Water. The Victoria and Albert Museum also has some of his work.

== See also ==
- Tim Hunkin
