= Beltane School =

Progressive school in England founded by Jewish emigres

- Wimbledon, London; England

Information
- Type: independent school
- Established: 1934; 92 years ago
- Closed: 1941

Beltane School was an independent school in Wimbledon, London and later Melksham, Wiltshire, founded in 1934 and closed in 1941. Beltane was one of the Schools in Exile founded by teachers and educators who had been forced to leave Germany for political reasons or because of their Jewish ancestry.

The school's founders were socialists and the education, using the Montessori method, was regarded as innovative and iconoclastic compared to the English school system of the time.

== History ==
Beltane was founded by German educationalists Ilsa and Ernst Bulova with English progressives Joan and Andrew Tomlinson. The school was named for the traditional May Day festival.

The school initially comprised 30 German and Austrian emigrant children with an equal number of English children. Many of the German students had previously been taught by the Bulovas in Berlin.

By 1937 there were 23 teachers and 200 students. At this point, Beltane was primarily a day school, but offered places for 60 boarding students.

With the outbreak of World War II, the school moved to Wiltshire and became a boarding school.

== Notable staff and alumni ==
- Ernst and Ilsa Bulova went on to found Buck's Rock Performing and Creative Arts Camp with support of relatives from the Bulova watch company
- Ulrich K. Goldsmith worked as a language teacher for Latin, German and English from 1934 onwards. He was interned as an enemy alien in June 1940 and deported to Canada a month later
- Arthur Wragg, pacifist and illustrator, taught at Beltane from 1941 onwards
- Harry Blamires worked at Beltane, after being forced to leave his job at Nottingham College because he was a conscientious objector
- Denis Grant King, another conscientious objector, taught history, geology, archaeology and woodwork
- Barbara Steele was a student at Beltane and then at King Alfred School, London
- Hilary Kilmarnock attended for a year after leaving Bedales School due to bullying
- Charlotte Mayer, a sculptor whose work was influenced by her unhappy time at the school
- William Bennett (flautist) began to play the flute as a student at Beltane
- Ann Dally, author and psychiatrist, was a student at Beltane
- Edmund Rubbra, composer, taught music at Beltane
- Raoul Bott, mathematician, was sent to Beltane in 1939 from Bratislava, where his education had been disrupted by the war

== Beltane School internment camp ==
After the school moved to Wiltshire, the original site in Wimbledon was used as an internment camp for German detainees, also referred to as "Beltane School". The camp held both Nazis and holocaust survivors together, which was the subject of questions in Parliament
