= Contemporary British Tapestry =

In addition to the simple concepts of contemporary (post World War 2), British, tapestry, there were a number of major exhibitions bringing together artists who were from Great Britain or who had made their lives there. The broader topics of tapestry technique cross borders and are dealt with elsewhere. A number of very similarly named exhibitions in the 1980s and 1990s highlighted the reemergence of the art and craft of tapestry weaving, some exhibitions permitted a broader scop including embroidery and stitchery but many aimed to focus the minds of the viewer of contemporary design, using both traditional craftsmanship and challenging the boundary into art.

Peter Collingwood OBE challenged many traditional techniques with his macrogauze hangings which took textiles from the floor and wall to a new dimension hanging from wall or ceiling depending on the individual piece. Mary Farmer's leadership and mentorship within the MA Tapestry course at the Royal College of Art during this period was a precursor to other developments such as more distributed learning opportunities and the development of The British Tapestry Group in 2005 which emerged from peer-to-peer support of a handfull of tapestry weavers to a wider group based on similar principles.

== Contemporary British Tapestry (Sainsbury Centre for Visual Arts) 1981-2 ==
The exhibition Contemporary British Tapestry was curated by Kathleen McFarlane from the Sainsbury Centre for Visual Arts, University of East Anglia, Norwich, Norfolk, England (30 June - 9 August 1981) and then toured to:

- Walsall E. M. Flint Gallery, England (1-27 September 1981)
- Crawford Centre for the Arts, University of St Andrews, Scotland (30 October - 22 November 1981)
- Talbot Rice Gallery, University of Edinburgh, Edinburgh, Lothian, Scotland (8 January - 5 February 1982)
- Bluecoat Gallery, Liverpool, England (13 February - 12 March 1982)

It featured tapestries, hangings and Fibre arts of multiple construction methods. Not all artists/works featured at all localities, full details in the catalogue.

=== Known featured artists ===
- Sam Ainsley 1950 (United Kingdom)
- Candace Bahouth
- Susan Batori
- Tadek Beutlich 1922
- Archie Brennan (weaver) 1931 (United Kingdom)
- John Brennan (United Kingdom)
- Geraldine Brock
- Joanna Buxton
- Johanna Clark
- Peter Collingwood 1922
- Bobbie Cox
- Margaret Crowther
- Lynne Curran
- Birgitta Edwards
- Mary Farmer 1940-2021 (United Kingdom)
- Miriam Gilby
- Ruth Harris
- Maureen Hodge
- Matthew Inglis
- Elizabeth Jaundrill
- Janis Jefferies
- William Jefferies
- Bernat Klein
- Jenny Lee 1928 (Spain)
- Patricia Leighton 1950
- Joyce Macintyre
- Fiona Mathison
- Kathleen McFarlane
- Alison Mitchell
- Henry Moore 1898 (United Kingdom)
- Theo Moorman
- Eduardo Paolozzi 1924 (United Kingdom)
- Alec Pearson
- Tom Phillips 1937 (United Kingdom)
- Elizabeth Radcliffe
- Maggie Riegler
- Marta Rogoyska
- Sax Shaw
- Margaret Smitten
- Graham Sutherland 1903 (United Kingdom)
- Ann Sutton 1935 (United Kingdom)
- Janette Wilson

==== Catalogue ====
Contemporary British tapestry by the Sainsbury Centre and published by the University of East Anglia

== Contemporary British Tapestry (Ernst Museum, Budapest, Hungary and Nottingham Castle Museum and Art Gallery) 1989-90 ==
The exhibition Contemporary British Tapestry was coordinated by the Ernst Museum, Budapest, Hungary and Nottingham Castle Museum and Art Gallery with tours across sites in Hungary and England. It was organised by Victoria Preston at Nottingham Castle Museum and Art Gallery.

- Ernst Museum, Budapest, Hungary (9 August 1989 - 3 September 1989)
- Miskolc Gallery, Miskolc, Hungary (2-24 September 1989)
- Móra Ferenc Múzeum Szeged, Hungary (3 November - 10 December 1989)
- Savaria Museum Szombathely, Hungary (11 January - 12 February 1990)
- Nottingham Castle Museum and Art Gallery (10 March - 8 April 1990)
- Shipley Art Gallery, Gateshead, England (6 - 24 June 1990)
- Cooper Gallery, Barnsley, Yorkshire, England ( 29 June - 5 August 1990)
- Royal Albert Memorial Museum, Exeter, England (16 August - 1 September 1990)
- Williamson Art Gallery and Museum, Birkenhead, England (19 September - 28 October 1990)

=== Featured artists ===
- Margöt Barrow
- Sue Brinkhurst
- Joanna Buxton
- Jenny Cook
- Lynne Curran
- Grace Erickson
- Mary Farmer
- Sarah Flatman
- Brigitte Gibbon
- Maureen Hodge
- Janis Jefferies
- William Jefferies
- Jo Llewellyn
- Malgorzata Martynowicz
- Fiona Mathison
- Tass Mavrogordato
- Lorraine Renwick
- Marta Rogoyska
- Karen Scadeng
- Dilys Stinson
- Fiona Walker

==== Catalogue ====
Contemporary British tapestry by Victoria Preston and published by Nottingham Castle Museum

== Contemporary Tapestry (Ruskin Craft Gallery) 1990-1 ==
- Ruskin Craft Gallery, Sheffield, Yorkshire, England.(4 June 1990 to 21 July 1990)

The exhibition toured from the Ruskin Craft Gallery

- Batley Art Gallery, Batley, Yorkshire, England (28 Dec 1990 - 02 Feb 1991)
- It was shown alongside the Scarborough Art Society Annual Show at the Scarborough Art Gallery (16 February 16 March 1991).

=== Featured artists ===
- Liza Collins
- Jennie Moncur
- Sarah Farrow
- Jeni Ross

== Woven Image - Contemporary British Tapestry (Barbican Centre, London, England) 1996-7 ==
Woven Image - Contemporary British Tapestrywas curated by Peter Sarginson for the Barbican Centre, London, England (19 January - 25 February 1996) and the exhibition then toured to

- Cartwright Hall Art Gallery, Bradford, Yorkshire, England (9 March - 6 May 1996)
- Mappin Art Gallery, Sheffield, Yorkshire, England (8 June - 8 September 1996)
- Newport Museum and Art Gallery, Newport, Wales (9 November 1996 - 11 January 1997)
- Aberdeen Art Gallery, Aberdeen, Scotland (255 January - 22 February 1997)

=== Known featured artists ===
- Candace Bahouth
- Jo Barker
- Margöt Barrow
- Joan Baxter
- Archie Brennan (weaver) 1931 (United Kingdom)
- Sara Brennan
- Sue Brinkhurst
- Joanna Buxton
- Edinburgh Tapestry Co
- Liza Collins 1961
- Bobbie Cox
- Lynne Curran
- Jilly Edwards
- Naomi Ellis
- Mary Farmer 1940 (United Kingdom)
- Amanda Gizzi
- Shelly Goldsmith
- Alice Hannigan
- Maureen Hodge
- Fiona R Hutchison
- William Jefferies
- Pat Johns
- Yumi Kobayashi-Lindsay
- Sue Lawty
- Ellen Lenvik
- Paola Marcellino
- Penelope Martin
- Fiona Mathison
- Tass Mavrogordato
- Ashley McCormick
- Kathleen McFarlane
- Lesley Millar
- Jennie Moncur
- Nina Moolgaoker
- Susan Mowatt
- Marie O'Mahony
- Clio Pandovani
- Caron Penney 1970
- Justine Randall
- Alison Roberts
- Marta Rogoyska
- Jeni Ross
- Christopher Sanderson
- Philip Sanderson (United Kingdom)
- Christine Sawyer
- Ingunn Skogholt
- Joanne Soroka
- Meira Stockl
- West Dean Studio
- Pat Taylor
- Leila Thomson
- Emma Jo Webster (United Kingdom)
- Kirsten C Wood
- Allison Young

==== Catalogue ====
Woven image contemporary British tapestry a Barbican Centre touring exhibition

== Tapestry 08 ==
Tapestry 08 is an exhibition of contemporary British tapestry weaving selected from an open submission and curated by The British Tapestry Group.

- Bankfield Museum, Halifax (7 June 2008 - 28 September 2008)

=== Known featured artists ===
- Fiona Abercromby
- Ingrid Arthur
- Alice Asad
- Jonathan Ashworth
- Joan Baxter
- Ruth Bell
- Jenny Blokhine
- Ros Bryant
- Carolyn Janet Clark
- Joyce Coulton
- Clare Coyle
- Margaret Crowther
- Alastair Duncan
- Jilly Edwards
- Jane Freear-wyld
- Kirsten Glasbrook
- Beryl Hammill
- Fiona R Hutchison
- Elin Huws
- Anne Jackson
- William Jefferies 1953
- Soon Yul Kang
- Hillu Liebelt
- Jennie Moncur
- Yoshiko Nakano
- Caroline Reali
- Shirley Ross
- Fiona Rutherford
- Christopher Sanders
- Christine Sawyer
- Ingrid Sixsmith
- Viga Slater
- Sallie Tyszko
- Mike Wallace
- Tricia Warman
- Hannah Weber

== Picking up the Thread: the Past, Present and Future of Tapestry ==
Recent exhibitions of The British Tapestry Group include a series of exhibitions to celebrate their 20th Anniversary.

- Gracefield Arts Centre, Dumfries (16 August – 4 October 2025)
- Dovecot Studios, Edinburgh (20 October 2025 - 14 February 2026)
- The Market Hall, Devonport, Plymouth (2 - 18 March 2026)
- Morley Gallery, London (13 - 25 July 2026)

=== Known featured artists ===
- Patricia Armour
- Ayesha Barlas
- Ghislaine Bazir
- Ruth Bell
- Jackie Bennett
- John Brennan
- Joanne Briffett
- Anita Bruce
- Jane Brunning
- Barbara Byrne
- Elizabeth J Buckley
- Elizabeth Chester
- Clare Coyle
- Mélanie Cros
- Renata Csoke
- Alastair Duncan
- Vicky Ellis
- Anne-Kirsti Espenes
- Irene Evison
- Mary Farmer (1940-2021) (exhibiting at Edinburgh and London only)
- Jane Freear-Wyld
- Paulette Furnival
- Emilia Gan
- Barbara Gardner Rowell
- Kate Gill
- Trisha Gow
- Sabine Hyland
- Penny Howes
- Lee Jenner
- Margaret Jones
- Magenta Kang
- Soon Yul Kang
- Bridget Lane
- Veronica Madden
- Erin McQuarrie
- Lindsey Marshall
- Jennie Moncur
- Louise Morris
- Susan Mowatt
- Gardner Muirhead
- Misako Nakahira
- Yoshiko Nakano
- Pilar O'Prey
- Kaori Okabayashi
- Anna Olsson
- Olga Owczarek
- Christine Paine
- Katharine Pulford
- Justine Randall
- Elizabeth Radcliffe
- Aruna Reddy
- Jane Riley
- Michael F Rohde
- Rena Roohipour
- Jackie Saunders
- Christine Sawyer
- Sophie Slade
- Beth Smith
- Matty Smith
- Lin Squires
- David Stokes
- Lucy Sugden
- Sara Trist
- Gyllian Thomson
- Misco Watanabe
- Anna White
- Emma Jo Webster
- Daisy Williamson
- Jennifer Woolnough
- Hanna Zabudska

=== Catalogue Extract ===
Picking Up The Thread The Past Present And Future Of Tapestry 2025-6 (extract)
