= Terry Moores =

UK based ceramicist and potter

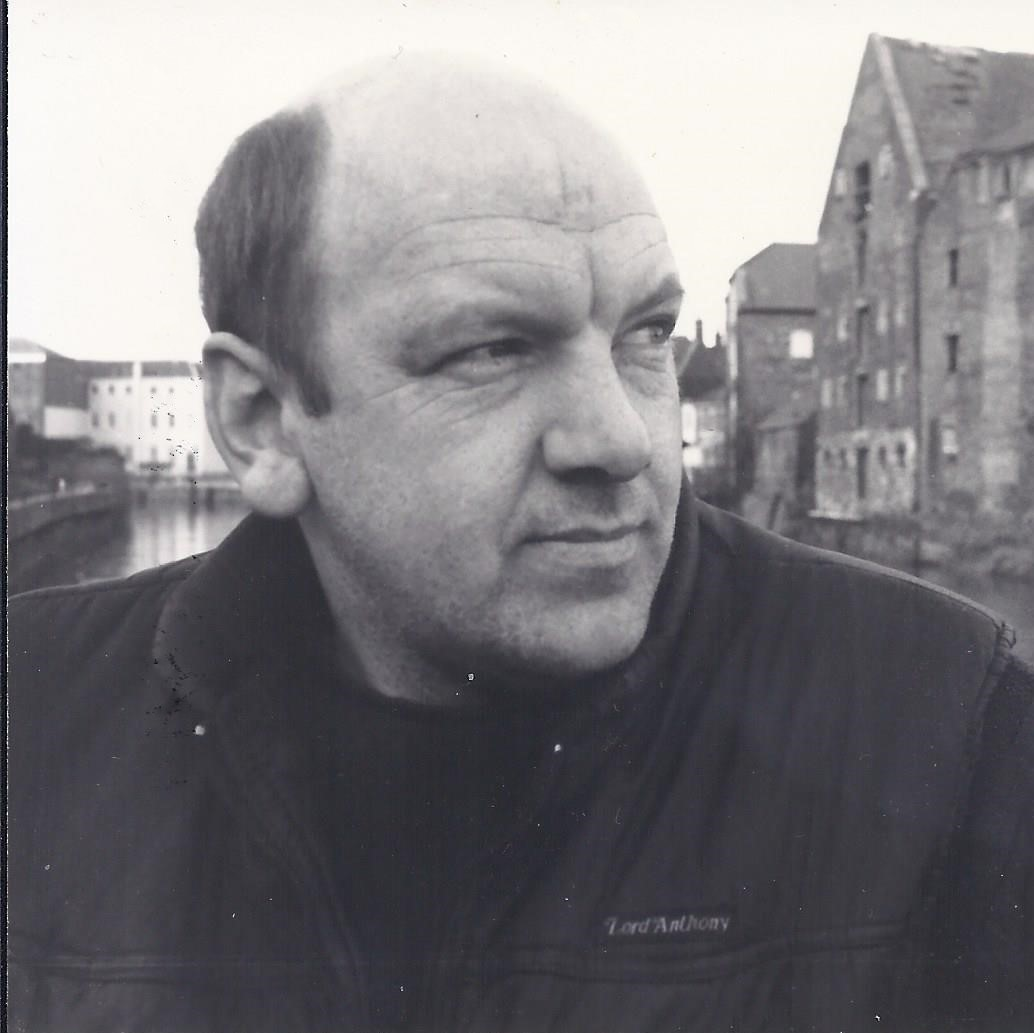
- Born: 26 August 1949; Ashton Under Lyne, Lancashire, England
- Died: 21 August 2014 (aged 64); Lincoln, Lincolnshire, England
- Spouse: Mary Farmer (1940–2021)
- Website: ArtFacts Profile

Terence William Moores (1949–2014) was an English ceramic artist, born in Ashton under Lyne, a town east of Manchester, and brought up in Denton (now part of Tameside). He went on to develop a career in ceramic sculpture, examples of which are found in the collections of the University of East Anglia and the British Museum.

== Ceramics and pottery workshops ==
Moores established independent ceramic workshop:

- 1977 Compton, Surrey, England
- 1982 Boston, Lincolnshire, England

Following his marriage to textile artist Mary Farmer they converted a listed warehouse on Doughty Quay to establish a joint workshop and home in Boston, Lincolnshire.

== Teaching ==
Part-time Lecturer at College of Art and Design, Loughborough

== Exhibitions ==
Moores exhibited in the UK, Germany and Estonia.

His most notable exhibitions were:

- 1982 The Maker's Eye at the Crafts Council, London
- 1981 Contemporary Ceramics - Henry Rothschild's Biennial Exhibition at Kettle's Yard, Cambridge, England
- 1985 Mary Farmer & Terry Moores at British Crafts Centre
- 1987 The Scattered Kiln at Usher Gallery, Lincoln, England

His last known exhibition, prior to his death in 2014, was in 1993.

== Death and legacy ==
Terry Moores died 21 August 2014 in Boston, Lincolnshire, England leaving his widow Mary Farmer. The Warehouse at 50 High Street, Boston, Lincolnshire, and the contribution of Mary Farmer and Terry Moores to their respective fields as Designer Craftspeople has been recognised by the Boston Preservation Trust's Blue Plaque scheme.

== Collections ==
- University of East Anglia
- British Museum
