= Textiles Today =

1981 exhibition in England of textile arts

Textiles Today was an exhibition of textile arts, selected by the prominent designer Marianne Straub at Kettles Yard, which toured England in 1981, funded by the University of Cambridge and Arts Council England. Straub was the designer of one of the most persisting moquette's on London Underground for many years.

== Artists involved ==
- Janet Anderson
- Archie Brennan (weaver)
- Ursula Brock
- Sarah Bungey
- Anne Cowley
- Rosemary Goldfrap
- Mary Farmer
- John Hinchcliffe
- Miranda Kudibalova
- Fiona Mathison
- Alec Pearson
- Mary Restieaux
- Phyliss Ross
- Norman Scott
- Ingunn Skogholt
- Amelia Uden

== Exhibition tour ==
Exhibition tour
Dates	Exhibition sites
31 Jan 1981 - 22 Feb 1981	Kettles Yard, Cambridge, England
28 Feb 1981 - 29 Mar 1981	Castle Museum and Art Gallery, Nottingham Castle, England
4 Apr 1981 - 26 Apr 1981	Staffordshire County Museum, Shugborough, Staffordshire, England
4 May 1981 - 30 May 1981	West Surrey College of Art and Design, Farnham, Surrey, England
6 Jun 1981 - 5 Jul 1981	Shipley Art Gallery, Gateshead, England
11 Jul 1981 - 15 Aug 1981	Victoria Art Gallery, Bath, England

== Textiles Today? (2026) ==
In October 2026 Amanda Game reflected on the earlier Kettle's Yard exhibition with work from some participants from the earlier exhibition and two later generations.

Textiles Today? includes Jo Barker, Mary Farmer, Amber Fry, Jacob Monk, Eleanor Pritchard, Mary Restieaux, Ann Sutton and Jun Tomita at Fen Ditton Gallery, Fen Ditton, Cambridgeshire, England.
