= Contemporary Applied Arts =

Organisation of British crafts people

- Formation: 1972; 54 years ago
- Type: Craft organisation and gallery
- Headquarters: 6 Paddington Street, London W1U 5QG
- Region served: United Kingdom

Contemporary Applied Arts (CAA) is a British art gallery and professional membership organisation in London, England. Established in 1948 as the members' selling organisation Crafts Centre of Great Britain (CCGB), it was known as the British Crafts Centre from 1972 to 1986.

== History ==
Five societies cooperated in this enterprise:

- The Arts and Crafts Exhibition Society
- The Red Rose Guild
- The Society of Scribes and Illuminators
- The Senefelder Club (lithography)
- The Society of Wood Engravers

The late HRH Prince Philip, Duke of Edinburgh accepted Presidency in 1953 and provided active support, advice and custom until his death in 2021. He purchased two rugs from Mary Farmer in 1965/6 for his personal collection.

In 1964, the CCGB adopted the Preliminary Proposals for the establishment of a Crafts Council of Great Britain (CCoGB). Cyril Wood was appointed Director of both CCGB and CCoGB, later that year deciding that the CCGB should be closed down. A temporary reprieve at Hay Hill, then saw the CCBG move to Covent Garden in 1966 under the stewardship of the Chairman Graham Hughes.

In 1972 the Crafts Centre and Crafts Council of Great Britain merge forming the British Crafts Centre. The CCGB is not the same organisation as the Crafts Council which was a later renaming of the Crafts Advisory Committee in 1979. Tania Harrod reflected on the first 50 years in 1998 At the time of their 75th Anniversary the Crafts Council reflected that the "selected members are professionals rigorously chosen by a panel of their peers. Belonging to CAA is seen as a kitemark of excellence."

Karen Elder was appointed Director of the British Crafts Centre on 6 May 1980 taking over from Malcolm Maclntyre-Read’s who went onto work with the World Crafts Council {Europe).

As of 2015, the gallery director was Clare Maddison.

== Locations ==
- 16/17 Hay Hill, London, W1J 8QP (Mayfair, off Piccadilly), which opened as a showroom in April 1950, and trading from 1953.
- 43 Earlham Street, London WC2H 9LD (Covent Garden), from 1967.
- 2 Percy Street, London W1P 9FA, from 1996.
- 89 Southwark Street, Bankside, London, SE1 0HX, from 2013.
- 6 Paddington Street, London, W1U 5QG, since 2019.
