= Patrick Murphy (giant) =

Irish entertainer (1834–1862)

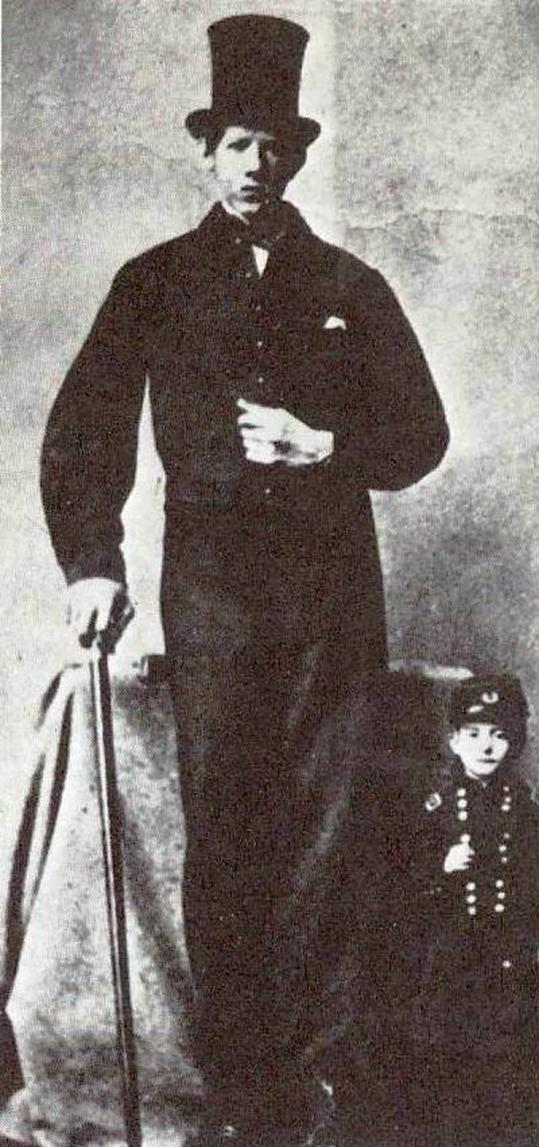
- Born: 15 June 1834
- Died: 18 April 1862 (aged 27); Marseille, France
- Resting place: Kilbroney, County Down

Patrick Murphy (1834–1862) was an Irish giant and fairground performer, potentially the tallest man ever recorded.

== Early life ==
Murphy was born in Killowen, County Down on 15 June 1834 of parents James and Peggy Murphy (née Cunningham). His father was a smallholder. As a child, he had an unremarkable physique.

== Record height ==
He worked on the docks in Liverpool, England and due to his stature it is said he did two men's labour for double wages. Some sources state he also worked as a hotel waiter, but quit due to the crowds and attention he drew. It was only when he returned to Ireland after a year to stay with his mother, that the locals in Warrenpoint became aware of his new height. He was over 8 feet (2.44m) tall when he reached his early 20s.

Sources at the time list his height between 7 ft 5.5 in (227.3 cm) and 8 ft 10 in (269 cm). In about 1860, he was measured by Dr Rudolph Virchow as being 7 ft 3 in (222 cm) tall. His height recorded in the parish register after his exhumation was 8 feet 1 inches (2.46 m), which is taken as the most credible record in some biographies. This height would make him the tallest man in the world during his lifetime and one of the tallest ever recorded. It was noted that he did not suffer from any excess bone growth or associated muscular atrophy which is generally seen in cases of giantism linked with hypersecretion of the growth hormone, somatotrophin. Amongst the acts he did for the amusement of local children and others was to light his pipe on gas lamps.

== Exhibitions and tours ==
Initially reluctant, he eventually decided that he could make a living being tall and began to exhibit himself from the mid 1850s. In May 1857 the Emperor and Empress of Austria invited the towering native of Ireland to visit their kingdom. After a European tour, he purchased a small farm in Kilbroney, near Rostrevor but after he was evicted, he resumed touring Europe.

== Death ==
On 18 April 1862, while on that tour, he died of smallpox in Marseille at the age of 28. He was buried at Kilbroney cemetery on 18 June 1862.
