= A closer look at rugs =

1983-85 art exhibition curated by Peter Dormer

A closer look at rugs was an art exhibition which toured between 1983 and 1985. The trio of A Closer look exhibitions (1983–5), curated by Peter Dormer started with concurrently run exhibitions at the Waterloo Place Gallery of the Crafts Council. The tour tended to separate the three themes for practicality of space.

- A closer look at rugs
- A closer look at lettering
- A closer look at wood

The exhibitions presented craftwork of a national standard to localities and venues which could not usually access them. Galleries were also used the exhibitions to emphasise their permanent collections. Whilst the theme of this series was on rugs, in many localities they were presented more like tapestries as wall-hung pieces of art and/or craft. ]

== Exhibition tour locations ==
- Rowley's House Museum, Shrewsbury, Shropshire
- The Wilson, Cheltenham Art Gallery and Museum, Cheltenham Spa, Gloucestershire
- Kirkleatham Museum Redcar
- The Cooper Gallery, Barnsley, Yorkshire
- Tullie House Museum, Carlisle, Cumbria
- Cleveland Craft Centre, Middlesbrough
- Jersey Arts Centre, Saint Helier, Jersey
- Coach House Gallery, St Peters, Guernsey
- Aylesbury Exhibition Gallery, Milton Keynes, Buckinghamshire
- Quarry Bank Mill, Wilmslow, Cheshire
- Woodhorn Museum, Ashington
- Northern Gallery for Contemporary Art, Sunderland
- Huddersfield Art Gallery, Huddersfield, West Yorkshire
- European Centre for Folk Studies, Llangollen, Wales
- Henry Thomas Gallery, Carmarthen School of Art, Carmarthen, Wales
- The Williamson Art Gallery and Museum, Birkenhead, Wirral
- Kirkcaldy Galleries, Kirkcaldy, Scotland
- The Minories, Colchester, Essex
- St Peter's Arts Centre, University of Central Lancashire, Preston, Lancashire

== Participants ==
A select group of the leading rug weavers of the era
- Margaret Bristow
- Mary Farmer
- John Hinchcliffe
- Wendy Jones
- Lesley Millar
- Fay Morgan
- Roger Oates
- Vanessa Robertson
- Caroline Singer
- Norman Young
