= Ballinran Court Tomb =

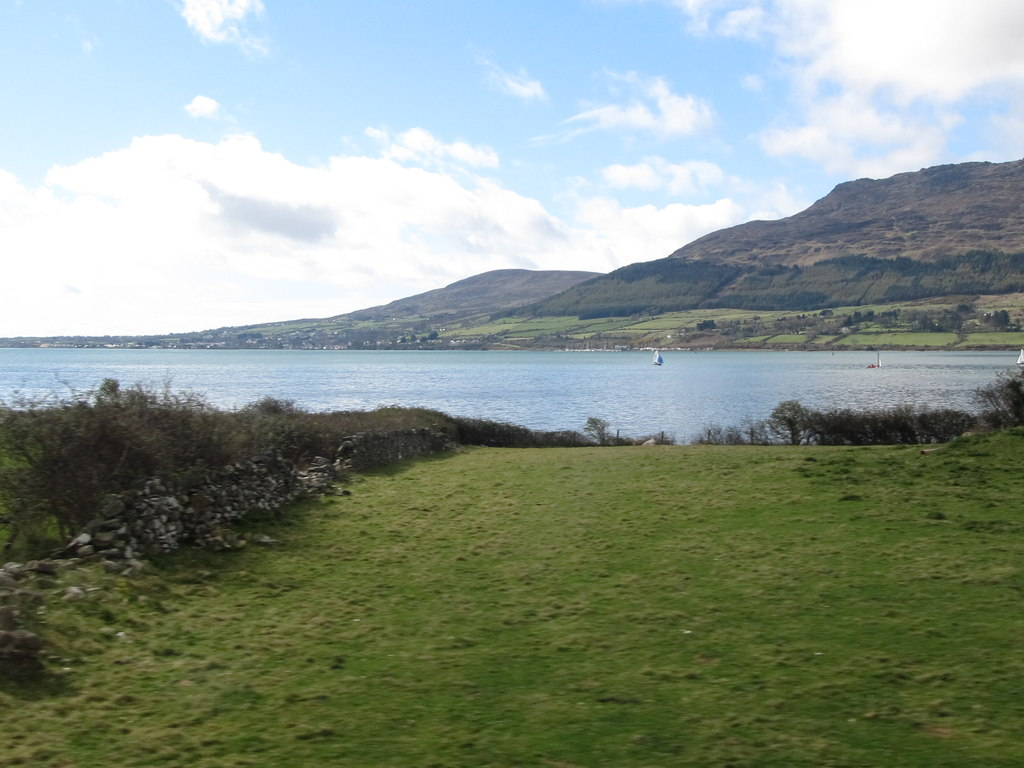
- Approximate site of Ballinran tomb

- Location in County Down, Northern Ireland
- 54°4′26.5″N 6°10′35.2″W
- Type: Court tomb
- Periods: Neolithic
- Cultures: Celtic
- Location: County Down, Northern Ireland

History
- Built: c. 3000 BC

Site notes
- Length: 12 m (39 ft)
- Excavation dates: 1976
- Archaeologists: A. E. P. Collins

Ballinran Court Tomb (sometimes known as the Giant's Grave) is situated close to Killowen, County Down, Northern Ireland, on the shore of Carlingford Lough. The site was excavated in April and May 1976 in preparation for a road widening project. The excavation revealed the remains of a large court tomb, despite the absence of visible surface features.

== Location and Historical References ==
The tomb is situated just south of the Rostrevor–Kilkeel road, in proximity to the shore of Carlingford Lough. It was first recorded in the 1858 Ordnance Survey Revision Name Book and appeared on early editions of the six-inch Ordnance Survey maps. By the late 19th century, the monument had largely been destroyed, though its location remained accurately marked on subsequent maps.

== Structure and Layout ==
The excavation uncovered a burial gallery consisting of five or six segments, aligned approximately north–south, with the forecourt facing the Mourne Mountains. The gallery featured stone sockets for orthostats, some of which contained packing stones or fragments of the original stones. The forecourt was asymmetrical, with better preservation on the western side. No evidence of the original cairn covering survived, suggesting it had been removed prior to the first edition of the Ordnance Survey map.

== Finds ==
No trace of burial deposits was found in situ, although some cremated, presumably human, bone and three primary flint flakes were found. A 'nest' of winkle shells (Littorina littorea) were found placed in a pit as a secondary deposit in the grave. Artifacts recovered from the site were minimal. There was also a child's slate pencil, an iron ring (likely a harness fitting). The presence of 19th-century items within the stone sockets suggests post-destruction disturbance and re-use of the site.
