= Killowen =

Village in Northern Ireland

Coordinates: 54°04′30.86″N 6°10′52.83″W

Killowen: Irish: Cill Eoghain ‘Eoghan's church’
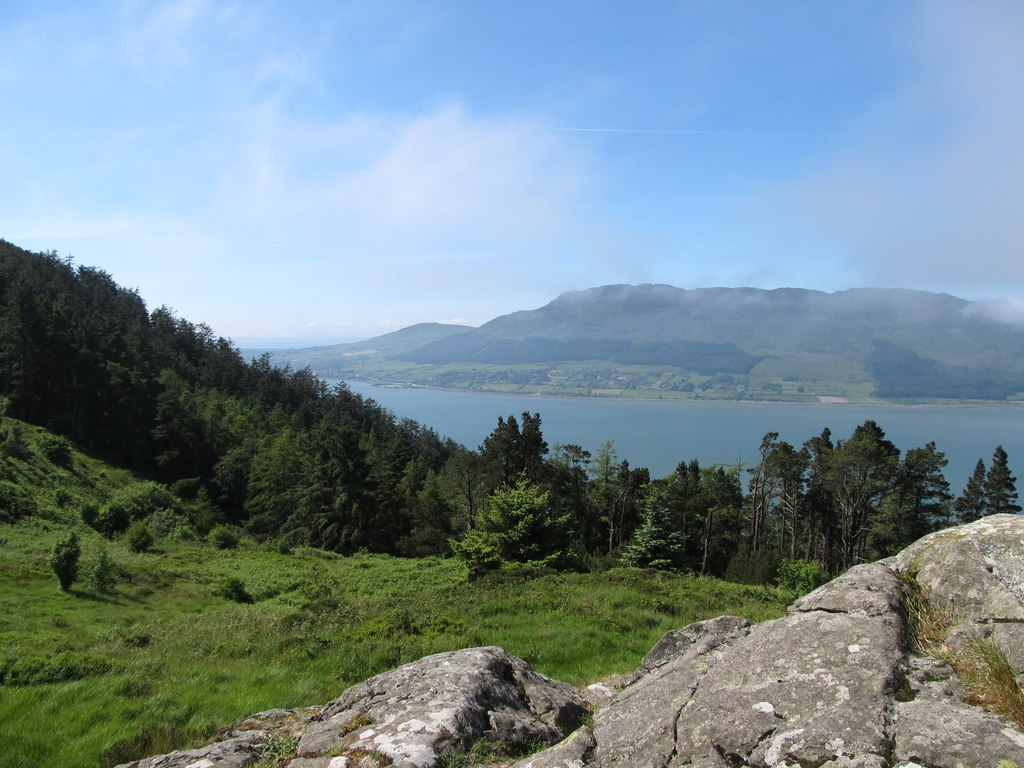
- Carlingford Lough from the slopes of Slievemeel at Killowen

- Location within Northern Ireland Location within County Down Killowen (County Down)
- Population: 225 (2021 census)
- Irish grid reference: J190155
- District: Newry, Mourne and Down
- County: County Down
- Country: Northern Ireland
- Sovereign state: United Kingdom
- Post town: NEWRY
- Postcode district: BT34
- Dialling code: 028
- UK Parliament: South Down
- NI Assembly: South Down

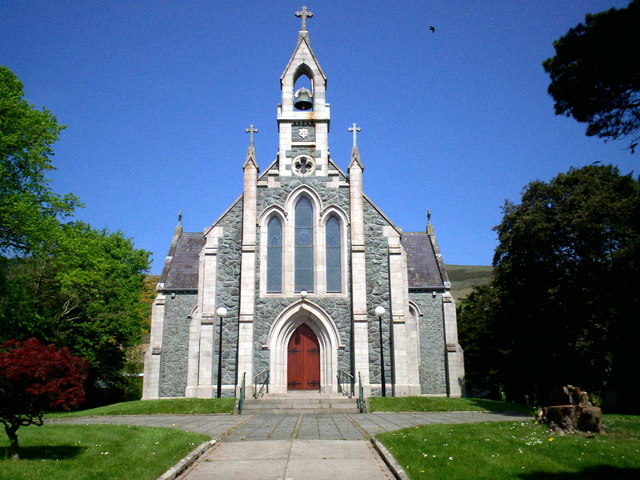
Church of the Sacred Heart, Killowen

Killowen (from Irish Cill Eoghain 'Eoghan's church', now spelt Cill Eoin, alternatively spelt Cill Abhainn) is a small village in County Down, Northern Ireland. It is in the townland of Ballinran near Rostrevor and on the shore of Carlingford Lough. Ballinran is in the Electoral Division of Killowen, in Civil Parish of Kilbroney, in the barony of Iveagh Upper, Upper Half within the Newry and Mourne District Council area.

== History ==
In 1976, a court tomb known locally as the "Giant’s Grave" at Ballinran, near Killowen on the shore of Carlingford Lough, was excavated ahead of road widening works. The site, located on boulder clay over Silurian shale, revealed sockets for orthostats that confirmed the presence of a long north-south aligned gallery tomb with a circular forecourt at the northern end. Although no cairn or kerb stones survived, the segmented gallery, over 12 meters long, featured typical sills and jambs, and one portal socket still contained a fractured stone stump. While no intact burials were found, cremated human bone fragments were recovered from several sockets, likely remnants from when the orthostats were removed. Additionally, three flint flakes were discovered, one of which may be associated with the tomb’s original use.

== Baron Russell of Killowen ==
Born Charles Russell in Newry, Ireland, in 1832, rose from modest beginnings in Killowen to become one of the most distinguished legal minds of his time. He was elevated to the peerage, choosing the title "Baron Russell of Killowen" in honour of his birthplace. Russell's career spanned roles as solicitor, barrister, Member of Parliament, Attorney General, and ultimately Lord Chief Justice of England, the first Catholic to hold the position in centuries.

== The Irish Giant, Patrick Murphy ==
Patrick Murphy, famously known as the original Irish Giant, was born on 15 June 1834 in Killowen. His extraordinary height, measured at 7'3.4", made him a figure of fascination across Europe. Though he initially resisted public exhibition, he eventually toured as part of a curiosities show, mingling with aristocracy and earning enough to buy a farm near Rostrevor. Despite his travels, Killowen remained central to his story: it was his birthplace, early home, and the foundation of his identity. His legacy endures in the listed building he once lived in and in the memory of Killowen as the origin of Ireland’s most iconic giant.

== Ballyedmond Castle ==
A Victorian Tudor-Baronial mansion set within the Mourne Area near Killowen. Originally built around 1855, possibly by architect Sir Charles Lanyon, it replaced an earlier 18th-century house visited by novelist Maria Edgeworth. The estate, once extending to 347 acres, has a long and varied history, including use by the U.S. Air Force during WWII and later as a luxury hotel before being damaged in a 1979 terrorist attack. It was restored in the late 1980s by Dr Edward Haughey, later Baron Ballyedmond. The demesne historically extended toward Killowen, with remnants of the original drive still connecting the Killowen Road and Killowen Old Road.

== Education ==
- Killowen Primary School

== Climate ==
Climate data for Killowen (1991–2020 normals)
Month	Jan	Feb	Mar	Apr	May	Jun	Jul	Aug	Sep	Oct	Nov	Dec	Year
Record high °C (°F)	14.9 (58.8)	15.6 (60.1)	19.3 (66.7)	21.1 (70.0)	31.3 (88.3)	27.4 (81.3)	30.8 (87.4)	28.6 (83.5)	27.2 (81.0)	21.9 (71.4)	17.3 (63.1)	15.9 (60.6)	31.3 (88.3)
Mean daily maximum °C (°F)	8.5 (47.3)	8.9 (48.0)	10.4 (50.7)	12.7 (54.9)	15.8 (60.4)	18.9 (66.0)	19.7 (67.5)	19.7 (67.5)	17.5 (63.5)	14.1 (57.4)	10.9 (51.6)	8.8 (47.8)	13.8 (56.8)
Daily mean °C (°F)	6.1 (43.0)	6.2 (43.2)	7.4 (45.3)	9.3 (48.7)	12.0 (53.6)	14.9 (58.8)	16.2 (61.2)	16.1 (61.0)	14.2 (57.6)	11.3 (52.3)	8.3 (46.9)	6.4 (43.5)	10.7 (51.3)
Mean daily minimum °C (°F)	3.6 (38.5)	3.5 (38.3)	4.3 (39.7)	6.0 (42.8)	8.3 (46.9)	10.9 (51.6)	12.7 (54.9)	12.5 (54.5)	11.0 (51.8)	8.4 (47.1)	5.8 (42.4)	4.0 (39.2)	7.6 (45.7)
Record low °C (°F)	−5.9 (21.4)	−3.9 (25.0)	−4.1 (24.6)	−2.7 (27.1)	0.7 (33.3)	3.6 (38.5)	6.2 (43.2)	5.6 (42.1)	3.5 (38.3)	0.3 (32.5)	−3.9 (25.0)	−8.1 (17.4)	−8.1 (17.4)
Average precipitation mm (inches)	103.6 (4.08)	75.5 (2.97)	85.2 (3.35)	72.2 (2.84)	71.6 (2.82)	77.3 (3.04)	80.8 (3.18)	90.9 (3.58)	79.2 (3.12)	100.5 (3.96)	113.1 (4.45)	111.5 (4.39)	1,061.2 (41.78)
Average precipitation days (≥ 1.0 mm)	15.0	12.8	12.8	11.4	11.8	11.2	12.9	12.8	11.9	13.7	14.5	14.6	155.4
Source 1: Met Office
Source 2: Starlings Roost Weather

== People ==
- Charles Russell, Baron Russell of Killowen, a 19th-century statesman and Lord Chief Justice
- Patrick Murphy, Irish giant
- Gerd Hay-Edie, a Norwegian-born hand weaver who established Mourne Textiles at Killowen in 1948

== Sources ==
- Killowen Historical Society
- NI Neighbourhood Information System
