= Ann Dally =

English doctor, psychiatrist and author born 1926

- Born: 29 March 1926; London
- Died: 24 March 2007 (aged 80); Graffham, West Sussex
- Education: Somerville College, Oxford
- Occupations: Author; Psychiatrist
- Known for: One of first three women to study medicine at St Thomas' Hospital, London
- Family: Gwen Mullins, mother

Ann Gwendolen Dally (née Mullins, 29 March 1926, in London – 24 March 2007, in Graffham, West Sussex) (Note: Obituaries in The Guardian and The Lancet give her birth year as 1929, though the Guardian later published a letter noting the error.) was an English author, doctor and—despite no formal training in psychiatry—a psychiatrist (working in private practice). She is known for her 1980s clashes with the General Medical Council regarding the treatment of heroin addicts.

== Early life and education ==
Ann Gwendolen Mullins was the eldest child of the weaver and patron of the arts Gwen Mullins and the lawyer Claud Mullins, and was born in a London nursing home at 27 Welbeck Street. Years later, her mother confided that "the moment the baby was placed in her arms, she knew she did not like it."

A keen reader from the age of four, Ann was educated at progressive schools in Epsom, Surrey (Sherwood School) and in Wimbledon, south London (Beltane School), followed by Wychwood School in Oxford. After she was expelled from Wychwood for being a bad influence, she went to Oxford High School.

== Career ==
Dally later said she was inspired to pursue medicine after reading Doctor Dolittle stories, but was temporarily deflected by poor school teaching and instead studied modern history at Somerville College, Oxford, where she was a contemporary of Margaret Thatcher. After graduating with a second-class degree in 1946, she worked in Germany and Austria for the War Office, giving history lectures to British troops.

In 1947, she was one of the first three women to study medicine at St Thomas' Hospital, London. She married Peter Dally in 1950, and had two children before she qualified as a doctor in 1953, after which she practised in general medicine, obstetrics and gynaecology until 1959. While raising a total of six children, she then worked part-time – including general practice, baby clinics and work for the Family Planning Association – and undertaking some medical journalism and broadcasting. As 'Ann Mullins', she wrote health and family-related articles for The Sunday Telegraph, Evening News, and Family Doctor and then produced books on related subjects, plus a biography of Jamaican doctor Cicely Williams in 1968. She also edited the paediatric journal Maternal and Child Care. For around ten years Dally also appeared on a BBC Radio London programme hosted by Robbie Vincent, becoming one of the first radio psychiatrists.

Dally later joined her husband in private practice as a Harley Street psychiatrist (he was also a consultant psychiatrist at Westminster Hospital), living and working from a large house at 13 Devonshire Place. Dally never formally trained in psychiatry but was an associate of the Royal College of Psychiatrists. The couple divorced in 1969, but continued working together.

In 1979, Dally began prescribing controlled drugs to heroin addicts, a practice then viewed with suspicion. But, according to medical historian Ruth Richardson, "She was concerned that the way the system worked denied people the sustenance they needed, and if this was taken away they'd be far more dangerous to society than if they were given it."

In 1983, she was found guilty of overprescribing and admonished by the General Medical Council. Four years later, she faced a further two charges relating to prescribing drugs to addicts, was found guilty of one of the offences, and was banned from prescribing or possessing controlled drugs for 14 months. She subsequently wrote about her GMC-related experiences in A Doctor's Story (1990). Some observers of the GMC's decision felt it was the action of a professional establishment out to 'get' a dissident member of its fraternity, though the GMC continued to defend its position. Dally remained angry at her treatment and felt government policy was mistaken; in 1995, she wrote "There are few things in the world that damage the quality of life more than present drug policies. These have become so destructive that I suspect that, in the foreseeable future, only historians could sort it out." A 1994 study of the GMC's disciplinary functions, by academic lawyer Russell G Smith, concluded that Dally had been "unjustly hounded" by the GMC.

In her 60s, Dally joined the Wellcome Institute for the History of Medicine as a historian, writing a book on the history of gynaecological surgery: Women Under the Knife (1991), one of a total of 11 books she produced during her career.

== Personal life ==
Ann and Peter Dally had six children. The couple divorced in 1969 (delaying the step to avoid upsetting Ann's father, a co-founder of the Marriage Guidance Council; he was also a co-founder of the Family Planning Association). On 29 June 1979, Ann Dally married management consultant Philip Wellsted Egerton (b. 1920). After the Devonshire Place house was sold in 1994, they divided their time between a flat in Wimpole Street and Wiblings Farm in Graffham, Sussex. Dally suffered a stroke there, dying shortly after, on 23 March 2007.

Dally was a friend of author Margaret Drabble, who used the Devonshire Place house as a location in her 1987 novel The Radiant Way, about a Harley Street child psychiatrist raising a large family.

== Bibliography ==
- An Intelligent Person's Guide to Modern Medicine (1966)
- Cicely: The Story of a Doctor (1968)
- The Birth of a Child: A Doctor's-eye-view Documentary of a Child Being Born (1969)
- Mothers: Their Power and Influence (1976)
- The Morbid Streak: Destructive Aspects of the Personality (1978)
- Why Women Fail: Achievement and Choice for Modern Women (1979)
- Inventing Motherhood: The Consequences of an Ideal (1982)
- A Doctor's Story (1990)
- Women Under the Knife – A history of surgery (1992) Hutchinson Radius, London ISBN 0-09-174508-X
- The Trouble with Doctors: Fashions, Motives and Mistakes (2003)
