= Gerd Hay-Edie =

Norwegian textile designer

- Hay-Edie from a 1965 newspaper
- Born: Gerd Bergerson; April 11, 1909; Trondheim, Norway
- Died: January 20, 1997 (aged 87)
- Other names: Mrs A W Hay-Edie, Bergie
- Education: Home Industries School for Women, Oslo
- Known for: Hand weaving
- Spouse: Archibald Walker Hay-Edie m. 1938
- Children: 4, including Karen Hay-Edie (weaver)
- Website: https://mournetextiles.com

Gerd Hay-Edie (4 November 1904 - 20 January 1997) was a pioneering handweaver and textile designer. She created The Mourne Check and The Mourne Mist for Robin Day's furniture range and fabric for Sybil Connolly’s clothing designs.

== Early life and education ==
Gerd Bergerson was born in Trondheim, to Olav Bergerson and Ynghild Grønning. She had three brothers. She attended both private and government schools, and went on to study design and hand-weaving at the Home Industries School for Women, Oslo. She was engaged as a young woman but did not marry.

== Early work ==
After leaving the Home Industries School, Bergerson was sent by the Norwegian government to Bilbao, Spain, for 18 months to teach weaving. In 1932 she moved to England and worked for the Rural Industries Bureau, travelling the country advising handweavers. In 1933 she created textiles for Holywell Mills in Flintshire, including the “very first double-weave furnishing fabrics used by Gordon Russell.”

=== Wilhelm Reich and Dartington ===
In 1936 she oversaw the Dartington Hall textile mill, where she became friends with town planner and journalist Jacqueline Weaver. She also met the Austrian psychoanalyst Wilhelm Reich (1897–1957), who told her, “You interest me. I want to know you.” About this comment, Bergerson later said she “sensed danger.” Later that year she returned to Norway, where she advised on home industries, and worked at Nydalen, Norway's largest textile mill. Aged 27 she was named “Advisor to the Norwegian Home Industries”. She helped establish Røros Tweed and the Norwegian Tapestry Yarn Company. When she moved into a flat in Oslo, Reich turned up on her doorstep, saying, “I told you I’d find you. I would like to find out more about you.” They developed an intellectual and sometimes physical relationship. Reich proposed marriage, but Bergerson refused. He had children by his first wife, and she knew that “marrying Reich would have meant subjugating her career to his”, something she was not prepared to do.

=== Marriage and Asia ===
She married Englishman Archie Hay-Edie (1904–1994) on 22 October 1938 at St John's, Windermere, Cumbria. She admits marrying Hay-Edie “on the rebound from Reich, someone completely different: a safe English gentleman – only to learn there is no such thing as a safe partner.” They spent WWII in Shanghai, Hong Kong and Calcutta, for Archie's work in the shipping industry. They had four children; she gave birth to her first daughter in Shanghai and first son in Calcutta. In China she learned to use local looms and in India she learnt to make hand-woven rugs. In Calcutta, the Palace of the Maharajah of Gwalior commissioned 22 hand-woven rugs from her. While in India, she met someone from County Down, Ireland. His description of the County Down countryside motivated her to move there with her children in 1947. Archie came a few years later, his work in the shipping industry keeping him in Asia.

== Ireland ==
Between Asia and Ireland, she lived in England. In 1947 Hay-Edie and her children moved to Kilkeel, County Down.

She initially installed a loom in her house, founding Mourne Industries, her intention being to establish a design studio. However she could not find sufficiently skilled craftworkers to make her creations so she moved into larger premises at Killowen, Rostrevor and began to train local women to work the looms, using Irish yarns from Donegal. In 1948 Jacqueline Weaver, her friend from Dartington, travelled to Ireland to help look after Hay-Edie's children, allowing Hay-Edie to devote more time to getting her business up and running. In 1949 she established the company Mourne Textiles. One of her products was an unusually woven “shaggy dog” cloth”.

=== Collaborations and commissions ===
In the early 1950s Robin Day wrote to Hay-Edie, “Of all the rugs which I have seen, only yours have got the character enough as a background for my new designs of furniture to be exhibited at La Triennale de Milano 1951…” Her rugs were exhibited alongside Day's furniture at the 1951 Milan Trienniale, earning her a silver medal and diploma. This success led to a long-term relationship with Day's Hille furniture brand through the 1950s and 1960s. Hay-Edie collaborated with fashion designer Sybil Connolly in 1950. In 1954 Terence Conran commissioned Hay-Edie to create textiles for his furniture ranges. One of her creations was Blazer furnishing fabric. In 1956 she won the bid to provide fabric for London Airport, her largest order to date. In 1961 she collaborated with local Down designer, Sheila Mullally.

In 1966 Hay-Edie “walked into the Liberty store and, without an appointment, convinced the buyer for the textile department to take orders of her fabric designs.” During Hey-Edie's career, she also worked with the House of Lachasse and Hardy Amies.

In the late 1970s much of Europe's textile production moved to Asia and Hay-Edie gradually had to let her weavers go. Her daughter, Karen, continued to accept commissions. Hey-Edie began exhibiting with Karen in 1980.

== Exhibitions ==
Her work featured in the following exhibitions:

- 1934: British Industries Fair, Birmingham
- 1951: Milan Triennial, Festival of Britain as part of the Royal Society of Ulster Architects (RSUA) Design Group's exhibition of architecture
- 1955: Helsingborg Exhibition, Helsingborg
- 1958: Piccolo Gallery, Belfast, College of Technology, Belfast (1958)
- 1964: Fine Crafts at the Arts Council, Dublin and Belfast (1964)
- 1965: Hand and Machine, Design Centre London Arts Council Gallery, Belfast
- 1966: Arts Council Gallery, Belfast, Trondheim
- 1972: Octagon Gallery, Belfast
- 1980: Octagon Gallery, Belfast
- 1982: Gilford Castle, County Down
- October 2016 Gerd Hay-Edie – Evolutionary Weaver, Margaret Howell, London

Hay-Edie also exhibited in Oslo, Zürich and Copenhagen.

== Television and radio ==
Hay-Edie appeared on the following programmes:

- 1963 – she was the subject of UTV's Lady in Question
- 1971 – interviewed by Gloria Hunniford on the BBC’s programme Talkabout
- 1972 – interviewed by Nick Ross on BBC Radio 4

== Memberships ==
- Kilkeel Commonwealth Technical Training Team committee, member
- Society of Industrial Arts (F.S.I.A.), fellow
- Red Rose Guild, member
- Crafts Centre of Great Britain, member
- Royal Ulster Academy, member

== See also ==
- Wilson, Colin (1996). The Quest for Wilhelm Reich. Doubleday. ISBN 9780385018456.
- BBC feature
