= Gwen Mullins =

English hand-weaver and patron of craftworkers

Gwen Mullins OBE
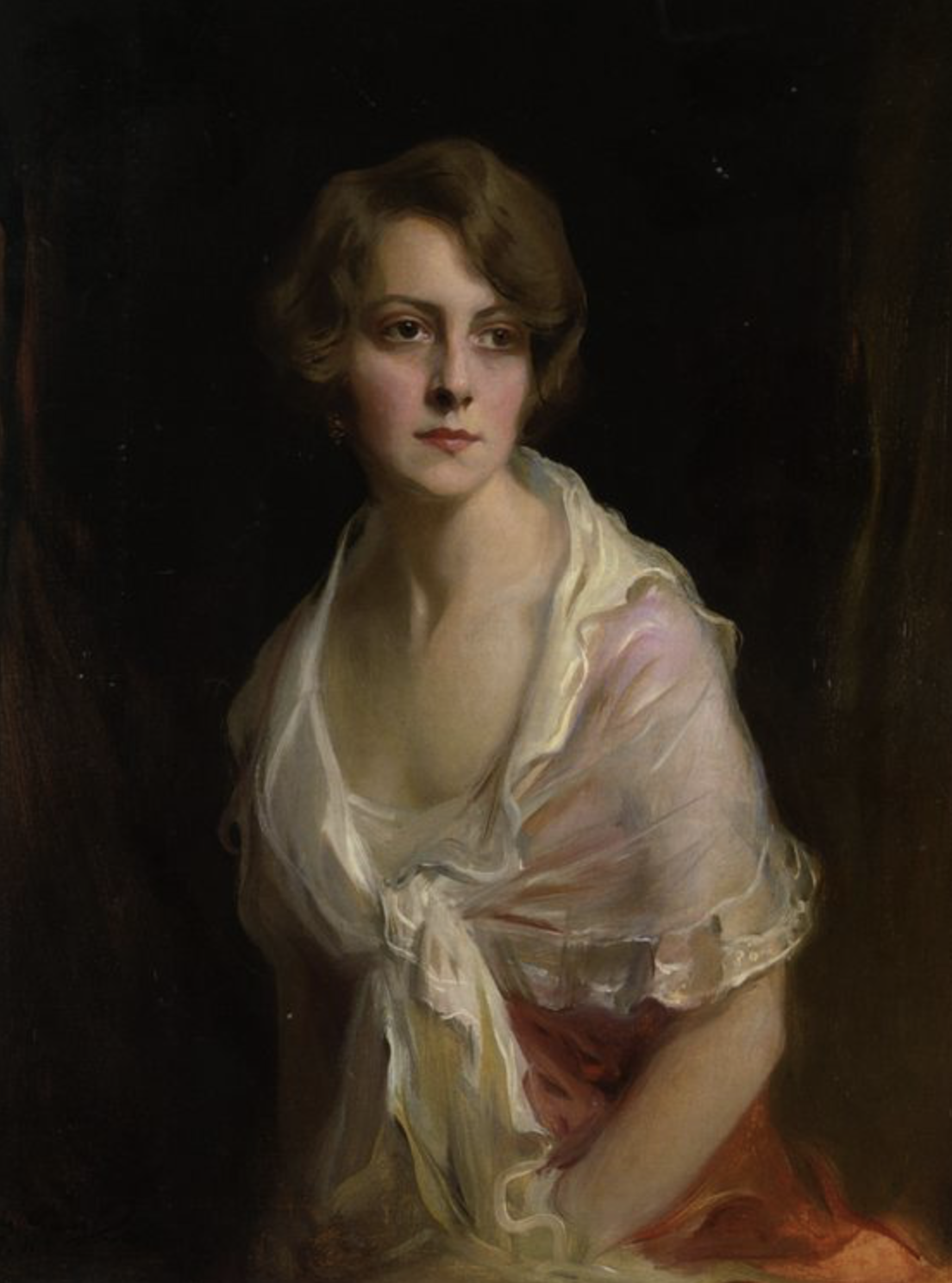
- 1925 portrait of Mullins by Philip de László
- Born: Elizabeth Gwendolen Brandt; April 10, 1904; London, UK
- Died: January 20, 1997 (aged 92); Midhurst, UK
- Other names: Mrs Claud Mullins
- Spouse: Claud William Mullins (m. 1925)
- Children: 3 including Ann Dally, (medical author, psychiatrist) and Barbara Mullins (weaver)

Gwen Mullins, (Note: Her married name was sometimes misspelt as Mullens.) OBE (10 April 1904 – 20 January 1997) was a hand-weaver and patron of craftworkers. She established the Gwen Mullins Trust in the 1950s, which provided financial support to craft workers. She also co-founded the Graffham Weavers.

== Personal life and education ==
Elizabeth Gwendolen was the second of two daughters of Augustus Brandt, a merchant banker of Russian-German descent, and Jean Champion Garmany, an American from Georgia.

She attended school in Paris. She was left-handed but as was custom at that time, as with any left-handed child, she was forced to use her right hand. After her formal education, she spent time in Italy, where she developed a love of art and ancient places.

She met lawyer Claud Mullins at a dinner party in November 1924. By December, they were unofficially engaged, although her parents were not impressed by his lineage, his mother's family being “in trade”. After intense discussions and interviews, they were officially engaged in February 1925. Her father made a “settlement” for Gwen of £20,000 (equal to £1 million in 2024). Before her wedding, she was painted by the Anglo-Hungarian artist Philip de László. She and Claud were married on 28 May 1925 at Holy Trinity Church, Brompton. She gave birth to their first child, Ann, by Caesarean section on 29 March 1926. Years later, she would confide that "the moment the baby was placed in her arms, she knew she did not like it." She had a second daughter, Barbara, also by Caesarean section, on 8 December 1927.

In August 1928, the family bought a house, 'Summerdale', in Epsom. In 1929, she and Claud co-authored a novel Parallel Lives under the pen name "G.M Seaham" (the surname sounding like 'C.M.', Claud's initials). They sent it to several publishers, but it was not taken up. In 1931, she joined the American Women's Club. On 14 September 1933, she gave birth to a boy, Edwin, again by Caesarean section. His arrival brought her family much happiness, her father having hoped for a grandson to join his family bank, William Brandt's Sons and Co.

On her thirtieth birthday, in 1934, Mullins' father increased her trust by £20,000, about which her husband wrote “We already have more money than we really need.”

In 1936, Mullins was "showing signs of great psychological strain" in part because of her eldest daughter, Ann, whose behaviour she found extremely stressful. She began a 100-hour course of treatment with Dr Rees, a psychotherapist who noted, "what a strange childhood she [Gwen] had." At this point, Mullins considered leaving Claud because of a sexless marriage, however in the legal world, he was known as the "Marriage Mender", and she did not want to cause a scandal.

After Claud retired in October 1948, the family moved to "Glasses", a house in Graffham, Sussex. It was here that she established her craft workshop.

Mullins died on 20 January 1997. Her funeral was held at Chichester Crematorium.

== Welfare work ==
Mullins was involved with "welfare work" in the mid-1920s. She had an interest in birth control and attended the annual meeting of the National Birth Control Association with Claud in 1931.

== Weaving ==
Mullins attended the "London School of Weaving" soon after getting married. In her weaving, she used a knotted pile technique, which gave freedom for design and created a “good heavy rug”. Of her work she said, it was “inspired and developed from sketches or photos brought back from walks and travels.” She had a particular interest in using vegetable dyes from locally sourced plants.

During World War II, she volunteered to teach weaving to billeted soldiers at Horton Hospital, Epsom. At this time, she expanded her craft knowledge with book binding lessons at Epsom School of Art and Design.

Mullins was affiliated with various weavers’ guilds. She was a member of the Red Rose Guild, the Society of Designer-Craftsmen and the London Guild of Weavers, Spinners and Dyers.

=== Exhibitions and collections ===
Her work appeared in the following exhibitions:

- 1965 – Ceylon Tea Centre, London
- 1967 – Ian Clarkson Gallery, Scotland
- 1970 – Craft Centre of Great Britain, London
- 1972 – Craftwork Guildford

Her work is in the collections of the Victoria and Albert Museum, Royal Scottish Museum, Crafts Council, and Worcester Cathedral.

== Graffham Craft Centre ==
In 1952, Mullins established the Graffham Craft Centre in a disused barn on her Glasses property. She became co-director together with her daughter, Barbara. The centre offered courses in weaving, basket-making, woodwork, pottery, spinning and dyeing. The Craft Centre held its first summer exhibition in 1954. Students included Mary Farmer and Shirley Lawn.

=== Graffham Weavers ===
Soon after opening the Craft Centre, Mullins established Graffham Weavers, which employed local women who became highly skilled weavers. Trainees also came from British art colleges, as well as from overseas, including Norway, Sweden and Germany. Graffham Weavers would hold twice yearly exhibitions of their work. Commissions for the Graffham Weavers included hangings for the altar and choir at Worcester Cathedral, a cope and mitre for the Bishop of Ripon and rugs for rooms at Exeter College, Oxford.

== Gwen Mullins Trust ==
With her inheritance, Mullins established the Gwen Mullins Trust in 1949. Its objectives were “the advancement, promotion and encouragement of the study of training and education in manual crafts, craftsmanship and the skill of craftsmen and the relief of poverty among needy craftsmen.” The Trust was a precursor to the Crafts Advisory Committee (1971) with which Mullins was closely involved, and subsequently the Crafts Council (1977).

Recipients of grants from the trust included:

- Peter Collingwood (weaver)
- Mary Farmer (weaver)
- Gillian Packard (jeweller)
- Janice Tchalenko (potter)
- The International Pottery Course at Wenford Bridge Pottery

== Craftman's Mark ==
Mullins funded Craftman's Mark, a non-profit enterprise, initially run by Morfudd Roberts, which provided hand-weavers with access to a more "finessed" yarn than was available commercially. Small batches of natural undyed yarns were spun to Mullins' specifications, and they were made available for independent weavers to buy in small quantities.

== Awards and honours ==
In 1974, Mullins was awarded an OBE for her work with the Gwen Mullins Trust.
