= Tibor Reich =

British textile designer (1916–1996)

Tibor Reich FSIA FRSA
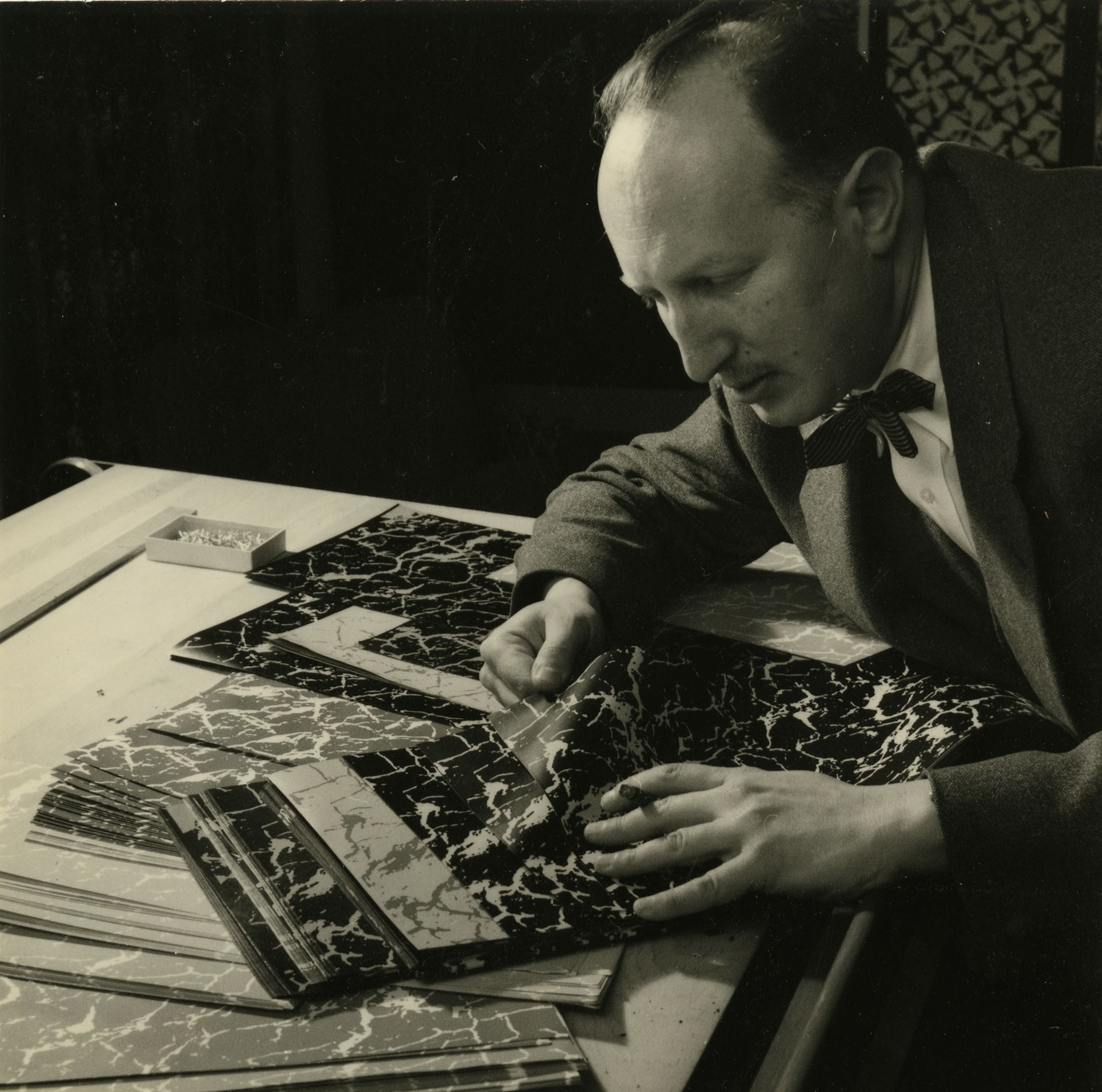
- Reich in 1957
- Born: Tibor Reich; 1 October 1916; Budapest, Hungary
- Died: 3 February 1996 (aged 79)
- Education: University of Leeds
- Occupation: Textile Designer
- Spouse: Freda Caplan

Tibor Reich ATI FSIA FRSA (1 October 1916 – 3 February 1996) was a British textile designer. His company, Tibor Ltd., produced designs featured in projects including the Festival of Britain, Concorde, HMY Britannia, Coventry Cathedral, Clarence House and the Queen Elizabeth 2. Reich was awarded a Design Council Award in 1957 and a medal from The Textile Institute in 1973.

== Early life and education ==
Reich was born in Budapest in 1916 to a family of wealthy Jewish textile industrialists. Encouraged by his father, he drew from a young age. In 1933, he left Budapest to study textile design and architecture in Vienna, where he was influenced by the legacy of the Wiener Werkstätte and the Bauhaus. With the rise of Nazism in 1937 Reich emigrated to Britain to study textiles at Leeds University.

Reich achieved the first-class result in the City and Guilds Institute examination in Woolen and Worsted Weaving. He was awarded a diploma from the institute in Textile Industries in September 1941, following the submission of a thesis titled "The Economical Production of Novelty Fabrics". After graduating from Leeds, Reich went to work for Tootal of Bolton, but left after a year.

== Tibor Ltd ==
In 1946 Reich moved to Stratford upon Avon and set up Tibor Ltd in a nineteenth-century mill at Clifford Chambers. From his studio, he established a small weaving unit, where he designed and manufactured speciality fabrics. His early weaves were purchased for dress couture, including by Edward Molyneux who used them for their 1946 United States export collection.

In 1947, Reich submitted one of his first hand woven furnishing fabric designs for selection by Princess Elizabeth. It was chosen as a wedding gift presented by the International Wool Secretariat.

By 1948, Reich was employing over 50 staff and had won a $100,000 order from Hambro House of Design in New York. In 1951, he was awarded a Certificate of Merit by the American Institute of Decorators.

== Deep textured weaves ==
Up until the early 1950s, British textiles, in particular furnishing fabrics, showed little consideration to colour, texture and modern pattern, with most relying on traditional motifs and woven in a simple process. Inspired by the Bauhaus and his pre-war training, Reich's deep textures were woven to give a third dimension to the surface pattern.

Michael Farr stated in 1954 that Reich had started a 'new phase in the development of British modern design for woven textiles.' Terrance Conran stated in 1957 "Tibor Reich is internationally known for his woven and printed textiles. The texture and weave of the cloth to be printed on are especially considered in his designs'

Reich designed deep textures for the Festival of Britain including the Southbank Festival Pavilions, Fairway Café, the Press Room, and the Royal Shakespeare Theatre, Stratford upon Avon, where he draped and upholstered the entire building. Major furniture manufacturers upholstered using Tibor fabrics including Ernest Race, Gordon Russell, Robin Day, Howard Keith, G Plan and Ercol.

In 1952, Reich had his first solo major show named 'Deep Textures with Rayon' at the Rayon Industry Design Centre designed by Hulme Chadwick. In 1954, Liberty and the Council of Industrial Design held a solo show of Reich's work named 'Adventure with Colour', opened by Percy Thomas. It would later travel around the UK.

Reich was commissioned to drape many projects in the 1950s. In 1954, Hugh Casson and Misha Black chose Tibor fabrics to drape the Royal Yacht Britannia and Time and Life Building. Other projects in the 1950s included London Airport (Heathrow), Arts Council UK, Berkeley and Washington Hotel, Renfrew Airport, Coventry Cathedral and the 1958 British Pavilion at the World's Fair, Brussels. In 1953, ICI commissioned Tibor to weave and design a tapestry for their coronation celebrations (also shown at the 10th Milan Triennial) and in 1958, Sanderson commissioned five tapestries to celebrate their 100th anniversary.

Tibor fabrics were also commissioned by BOAC, Conair, Hawker Siddeley planes and Cunard ships including RMS Empress of England, RMS Queen Elizabeth, RMS Ivernia and RMS Saxonia. He also acted as a designer for Quayle and Tranter, Wilton, Denby, Stockwell, and Bigelow and Sanford, USA. Tibor also collaborated with Courtaulds on seating fabrics for Vauxhall motor cars.

== Tigo-Ware ==
In 1952, Reich designed his own studio pottery range called Tigo-Ware to create pottery to coordinate with his deep textured fabric. He originally created the pottery from the back shed at his cottage. Demand soon outgrew their facilities and was by 1954, the pottery was produced in Denby. The Council of Industrial Design included over 14 of the Tigo pieces in their design review, which was an illustrated record of British designs.

As a range it had a style that was sophisticated, highlighted by flashes of gentle humour. Pieces ranged from utilitarian to sculptural. The expressing curving lines were scratched using the scraffito technique to expose the white earthenware body beneath. Pieces were often inspired by Hungarian folk art, and re-interpreted in a modern 1950s style.

== Fotextur ==
During the 1950s Reich, began experimenting with patterns deriving from photography, instead of using a brush to imitate nature. Whilst looking at a snapshot of his wife he noticed the light and shade patterns on a section of an old stone wall. In his dark room, he set about distilling the pattern from the wall and developed his patented process 'Fotextur.' This process produced a pattern by taking a photograph of a natural object or feature, making positive and negative prints from the photograph, and then re-arranging to make a design.

In 1957, the Fotextur fabric Flamingo was awarded a Council of Industrial Design award presented by Prince Philip in its inaugural year. Michael Farr wrote an article in Design calling it 'revolutionary' and stating 'Mr Reich has discovered a new way of seeing nature'. Pathe news also featured a newsreel on Fotextur.

Fotextur was used on textiles, carpets, tiles, bags and pottery.

== Colotomic ==
Launched at the Design Centre, Haymarket Colotomic was an evolution of the Fotextur process. It featured a print named Atomic that derived pattern from one of the first photographs ever taken of an atom-splitting experiment.

It was unique for its use of colour. In 1953 Reich had trademarked a pre-pantone idea of systematic colour charting called Collingo. Atomic came in fourteen colourways each colourway contained four tones of a single colour. There were three principle colour groups and each tone within each group of colour contrasted and worked together. The range was intended to allow the consumer to mix colourways in one setting. In a three-page article for Design magazine Stephen Garrett stated 'By careful selection of the colourways, it should be possible to get the exact overall colour effect that is wanted.'

== Tibor House ==
Having trained in architecture in pre-war Vienna, by 1956 Reich set to work on his own house. Drawing on Bauhaus ideas of functionality and movement, the house was used as both laboratory and show-room where textiles, furniture, floor and wall coverings, paint-work and lighting were tested and shown from a practical as well as an aesthetic point of view.

The 1950s house includes concrete, steel and atomic structures, indoor gardens and sliding doors. It also has a free standing mosaic fireplace dubbed the 'flaming onion,' cabins for his children's bedrooms and refrigerated filing cabinets for the kitchen (inspired by the Frankfurt Kitchen). A lot of these ideas were later taken up by industry. Comments about the house in 1957 included "The first imaginative use of the English open fire in a modern home. Architects can now work on from here," by Jacob Bronowski, in stark contrast to Norman Hartnell who stated "Monstrous without beauty. Any view through that meanly constructed window would be more pleasing than the hideous room behind"

== 1960s ==
In the 1960s, Tibor Ltd was commissioned to design the first sets of upholstery and curtain fabrics for the Anglo-French Concorde. Five Jacquard upholstery cloths in natural and gold were used as curtaining fabrics along with two carpet designs.

During the 1960s, Tibor fabrics were also on the QE2 and in embassies, royal palaces, hotels, Nos. 10 and 11 Downing Street, the Board of Trade Building, Windsor Castle, and the Shakespeare Centre. Over six miles of fabric was produced by Tibor for the Hotel Piccadilly in Manchester.

During the 1960s, Reich was commissioned to create works for major British institutions. These often took the form of richly coloured glowing tapestries and included designs for Coventry Cathedral, Manchester University, a 100-metre tapestry for the Board of Trade Westminster and the Academy Cinema. Tibor had showrooms in Old Burlington Street and Sloane Street and were stocked globally from the US to Japan. By the 1960s, Tibor Ltd was employing over 60 design staff and was the largest privately owned Textile Design studio in the UK. Tibor fabrics were produced in over eight mills throughout the country including Gregs Quarry Bank Mill, who part owned Tibor Ltd.

== Shakespeare ==
Reich and Shakespeare crossed paths many times. After moving to Stratford upon Avon and Clifford Mill in 1952, Reich was chosen as part of Stratford's contribution to the Festival of Britain, to drape and upholster the new Shakespeare Memorial Theatre (RSC). He named the fabrics after Shakespearean characters: Cymbeline, Oberon, Macbeth, Prospero.

In 1964, in celebration of Shakespeare's 400th Anniversary, Reich was commissioned by the Shakespeare Council to design and print a commemorative tapestry. He was also responsible for designing and weaving the fabrics and tapestries for the new Shakespeare Centre, which was opened by the Duke of Edinburgh. His most famous tapestry was 'Age of Kings' which is now featured in the V&A collection.

== Tiatsa Model Car Museum ==
Set up for his two sons, the museum was opened by Lord Montagu of Beaulieu in 1963. By the mid-1970s, Tiatsa was the largest model car collection in Europe. It is now on display at Coventry Transport Museum and totals over 30,000 models. In 1984, the entire collection was showcased on BBC's Blue Peter programme.

== Death ==
Tibor Reich died in 1996 aged 79 in Stratford-upon-Avon. He was survived by his wife Freda Caplan, a concert pianist who was a pupil of Frederic Lamond and his four children.

In August 2024, Reich's daughter appeared on BBC's Antiques Roadshow with two pieces of his ceramic work, one created in his original studio in Stratford and one produced by the Denby Pottery Company.

== Museums ==
Tibor Reich's works are included in the archives of:

- V&A, London
- Whitworth Art Gallery, Manchester
- Geffrye Museum, London
- Powerhouse Museum, Sydney
- National Museum of Stockholm
- VADS, University of Brighton Design Archives
- Shakespeare Centre, Stratford upon Avon
