= Ulrich K. Goldsmith =

- Born: January 19, 1910; Freiburg, German Empire
- Died: May 2, 2000 (aged 90); Boulder, Colorado, U.S.

Academic background
- Education: University of California at Berkeley

Academic work
- Discipline: Literature scholar
- Sub-discipline: German linguistics, Comparative literature

Ulrich Karl Goldsmith (January 19, 1910 – May 2, 2000) was an American scholar of literature and emeritus professor at the University of Colorado at Boulder.

== Biography ==
Ulrich Karl Goldsmith was born on January 19, 1910, in Freiburg (Black Forest) and had to leave Germany in 1932-1933 because of his Jewish origins and Nazi persecution. He came to the United States via England and Canada and received B. A. and M. A. degrees (in 1942 and 1946 respectively) from the University of Toronto, and earned his Ph.D. from the University of California at Berkeley in 1950, with a dissertation on Stefan George. He was appointed professor of Germanic languages and literatures at the University of Colorado at Boulder in 1957, later emeritus. He died in Boulder, Colorado on May 2, 2000, aged 90.

He chaired there the department of Germanic languages and literatures and later co-founded and chaired the program in comparative literature. He was a well-known scholar on Stefan George and Rainer Maria Rilke.

== Bibliography ==
- Barnes, Hazel E., Calder, Wiliam M. & Hugo Schmidt, eds (1989). Ulrich Goldsmith: Studies in Comparison. New York: Lang (Utah Studies in Literature and Linguistics 28). Bibliography of works by Ulrich K. Goldsmith: p. 483-493.
- Calder, William M., Goldsmith. Ulrich & Phyllis B. Kenevan, eds (1985). Hypatia: Essays in classics, comparative literature, and philosophy presented to Hazel E. Barnes on her Seventieth Birthday. Boulder: Colorado Associated University Press.
- Goldsmith, Ulrich (1951). Stefan George and the theatre. New York: The Modern Language Association (PLMA Publications LXVI:2).
- Goldsmith, Ulrich (1959). Stefan George: A study of his early work. Boulder: University of Colorado Press (University of Colorado Studies Series in Language and Literature 7).
- Goldsmith, Ulrich (1970). Stefan George. New York: Columbia University Press (Essays on Modern Writers).
- Goldsmith, Ulrich (1974). Shakespeare and Stefan George: The sonnets. Berne: Franke.
- Goldsmith, Ulrich, ed. (1980). Rainer Maria Rilke, a verse concordance to his complete lyrical poetry. Leeds: W.S. Maney.
- Goldsmith, Ulrich. ed. (1982). Critical probings: Essays in European literature: From Wolfram von Eschenbach to Thomas Mann. New York: Lang.
