= Lilian Dring =

British artist

- Born: Lilian Margery Welch; 1908; Surbiton, England
- Died: 1998 (aged 89–90)
- Education: Kingston School of Art; Royal College of Art
- Known for: Poster design, textile art
- Spouse: Cyril James Dring (m.1931–1985, his death)

Lilian Margery Dring (née Welch; 1908–1998) was a British artist known for her paintings, poster designs and textile designs. needlework and embroidery work.

== Biography ==
Dring was born in Surbiton in Surrey and attended the Kingston School of Art from 1922 to 1926 before studying for three years at the Royal College of Art in London. After she graduated Dring lived in Teddington and undertook freelance illustration work and also created designs for needlework and embroidery pieces. At the Royal College, Dring was among the first students to take the newly created course in poster design and this led to her submitting a number of poster designs to London Transport during the 1930s. One of these, The Modern God of Transport, was a large design over three poster sheets depicting the god Mercury running the London Underground network.

In 1940 Dring created a series of billboard posters for the Youth Hostels Association after which she appears to have concentrated on textile designs. From 1942 to 1945 textile pieces by Dring were included in British Council exhibitions in the United States. For the 1951 Festival of Britain she designed and assembled the 100 panel Patchwork of the Century. She was elected a member of the Arts and Crafts Exhibition Society and exhibited with the Embroiderers' Guild and at the Whitworth Art Gallery. Dring also wrote on arts and craft education for various publications and also wrote and illustrated several books for children.

Both the London Transport Museum and the Victoria & Albert Museum hold examples of Dring's poster designs, while the latter also has examples of her embroidery and textile work. A further piece, dating from 1938, is in the National Museums Scotland collection while the National Trust has a 1964 embroidered collage by Dring.
