= The British Tapestry Group =

Organisation of British Tapestry Designers and Weavers

- Formation: 2005; 21 years ago
- Type: Craft organisation
- Purpose: The British Tapestry Group promotes and explores the concept of woven tapestry as a contemporary art form.
- Region served: United Kingdom
- Members: Founding membership of five tapestry weavers, Ros Bryant, Janet Clark, Beryl Hammill, Shirley Ross and Nicola Wheeler. In 2025 several hundred members
- Leader: Chair: Paulette Furnival
- Website: www.thebritishtapestrygroup.co.uk

The British Tapestry Group (BTG) in 2005 which emerged from peer-to-peer support of a handful of tapestry weavers to a wider group based on similar principles. It now forms one of the organisers of many significant exhibitions each year, both regionally and nationally of Contemporary British Tapestry.

== Exhibitions ==
The BTG list their exhibitions on their website The British Tapestry Group Exhibitions.

Recent exhibitions include a series of exhibitions to celebrate their 20th Anniversary, Picking up the Thread: the Past, Present and Future of Tapestry

Tapestry 08 made a major impression on the mainstream Crafts Magazine in their review of the Bankfield Museum, Halifax exhibition shortly after their establishment.
