= Kilbroney, County Down =

Civil parish in County Down, Northern Ireland

Kilbroney is a civil parish in County Down, Northern Ireland. It is situated mainly in the historic barony of Iveagh Upper, Upper Half, with one townland in Iveagh Upper, Lower Half. It is also a townland of 575 acres.

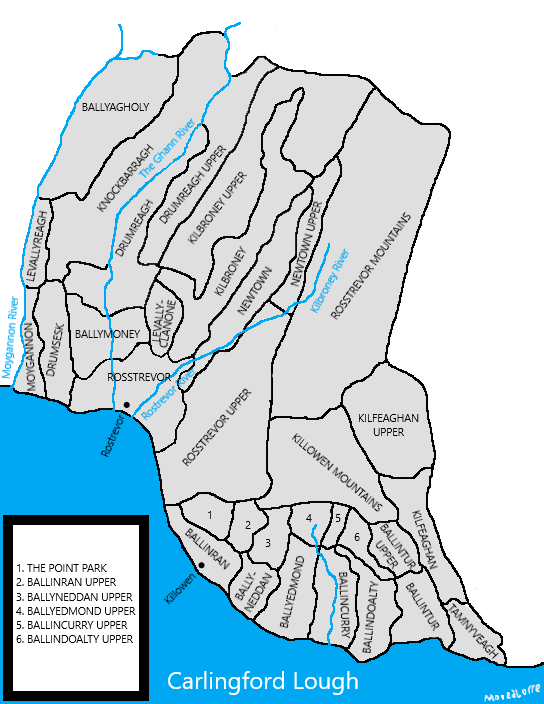
A map of Kilbroney civil parish

== Settlements ==
The civil parish contains the following settlements:

- Rostrevor
- Killowen

== Townlands ==
Kilbroney civil parish contains the following townlands:

- Ballincurry
- Ballincurry Upper
- Ballindoalty
- Ballindoalty Upper
- Ballinran
- Ballinran Upper
- Ballintur
- Ballintur Upper
- Ballyagholy
- Ballyedmond
- Ballyedmond Upper
- Ballymoney
- Ballyneddan
- Ballyneddan Upper
- Drumreagh
- Drumreagh Upper
- Drumsesk
- Kilbroney
- Kilroney Upper
- Kilfeaghan
- Kilfeaghan Upper
- Killowen Mountains
- Knockbarragh
- Levallyclanone
- Levallyreagh
- Moygannon
- Newtown
- Newtown Upper
- Rosstrevor
- Rosstrevor Mountains
- Rosstrevor Upper
- Tamnyveagh
- The Point Park

== See also ==
- List of civil parishes of County Down
- Kilbroney Park
