= Henry Rothschild =

Craft collector

Heinrich Wilhelm Jacques Rothschild (21 November 1913 – 27 May 2009) was a collector and dealer in ceramics, textiles and other craft works.

He was a Jewish émigré from Offenbach am Main who left Germany for England in 1933. He read natural sciences at Cambridge having studied chemistry at Frankfurt University. He graduated in 1936 and then joined the British Army in 1938, serving as an ordnance officer during the Second World War.

He developed an interest in ceramics, textiles and other crafts while campaigning in Italy during the Second World War, and founded the Primavera Gallery in Sloane Street in 1946. The London gallery closed in 1970 but he continued to run a branch in King's Parade, Cambridge which is still open.

After he died in 2009, his collection was donated to the Shipley Art Gallery in Gateshead. The Henry Rothschild Memorial Ceramic Bursary is a biannual award to a ceramic artist resident in the UK.
