= Ann Sutton =

British artist

Ann Sutton OBE
- Born: 16 May 1935 (age 91); Stoke-on-Trent, Staffordshire, England
- Education: Orme Girls' School, Newcastle-Under-Lyme
- Alma mater: Cardiff College of Art
- Known for: Weaver; Textile artist
- Spouse: John Makepeace 1964–1978
- Elected: Senior Fellow; Royal College of Art
- Website: annsutton.org

Ann Sutton OBE (born 16 May 1935) is a British artist, author, educator and broadcaster. She gained international recognition as an innovative textile artist and designer from the 1950s and has continued to develop her making and research in other media to the present day.

She was appointed Member of the Order of the British Empire (MBE) in 1991 and Officer of the Order of the British Empire (OBE) in the 2022 New Year Honours for services to the arts. She was made a Senior Fellow of the Royal College of Art and a visiting professor at the University of the Arts, both in 2005.

== Early life and education ==
Ann Sutton was born in Stoke-on-Trent, Staffordshire, England, on 16 May 1935. She attended local schools, including the Orme Girls' School in Newcastle-Under-Lyme, winning several art prizes. She moved to Pontypool, Monmouthshire in 1947 and from 1951 to 1956 studied at the Cardiff College of Art, where she gained a National Diploma in Design.

== Teaching career ==
Graduating from art college, Sutton became a full-time lecturer in weave at the West Sussex College of Art, Worthing from 1956 until 1963, while also returning as Visitor, Cardiff College of Art (1960) and working as a student and then tutor at the Glamorgan Summer School at Barry, South Wales (1961–1968). As her own studio work progressed, she combined this with part-time teaching at the Croydon College of Art (1963–1965) and the North Oxfordshire School of Art, Banbury (1967–1974). In 1990 Sutton became a part-time lecturer in woven and embroidered textiles at the Royal College of Art, and has also served widely as an external assessor at both BA and MA levels at many universities and colleges, including the Royal College of Art. In 2005 Ann Sutton was made both a visiting professor by the University of the Arts, London, and Senior Fellow of the Royal College of Art. She was a member of the Red Rose Guild.

== Studio career ==
=== Banbury ===
In 1964, Sutton married furniture designer and maker John Makepeace, and together they converted Farnborough Barn, near Banbury, Oxfordshire, into living and workshop space where they initially combined their careers. Makepeace employed craftsmen and trained apprentices on site; Sutton pioneered the use of local homeworkers, working to her original designs.

In 1970 she won joint first prize in the Sculpture ’70 Welsh Arts Council competition, while in the same year the Victoria and Albert Museum commissioned and purchased 16 prints on paper and aluminium for the solo show Textile Images on Paper. In 1974 she designed a "logical colour scheme" for a new quadrangle at Keble College, University of Oxford, with the architects Ahrends, Burton & Koralek.

=== Parnham House ===
Together with her then-husband John Makepeace, Sutton bought the 16th-century, Grade I listed Parnham House near Beaminster, Dorset, which was to become their new home, workshops and studios, combined with a new residential training college for craftsmen. In 1977 it opened as the Parnham Trust School for Craftsmen in Wood; early students included furniture designer and retailer David Linley, now the Second Earl of Snowdon. Sutton combined developing Parnham (the 80-roomed house was also open to the public) with her own work. From 1970 to 1988 she served on the committee of the Contemporary Arts Society, becoming a buyer of painting, sculpture and craft for the society in 1983. When her marriage to Makepeace ended in 1978, Sutton left Parnham to set up on her own in West Sussex. They were formally divorced in 1983.

=== West Sussex ===
In 1980, the newly-single Sutton bought and began to renovate a semi-derelict, former Cooperative shop in Tarrant Street, Arundel. This became both her new living and studio space. There she wrote and presented the 1980 five-part BBC television series The Craft of the Weaver, together with the accompanying book. During the 1980s, Sutton became an early adopter of new technology, and especially the use of computer-aided looms, which she pioneered. In 1985 she had a large solo exhibition at the Norrköpings Konstmuseum, Sweden and from 1989 to 1990 was a member of UK Government steering group "PerCent for Art". Sutton initiated what is claimed to be the world's first walking 'gallery trail', as part of the Arundel Festival, beginning in 1989. It continues annually today. Consultancies and public service also continued, including the award-winning refurbishment of the Southampton Art Gallery (1990).

Sutton founded Sight Specific, an agency for applied artists' commissions (1992); was a member of the Southern Arts Regional Arts Board (1992–1995); and held a consultancy with the Museum of Science & Industry, Manchester (1996). In 2003 Sutton won first prize in the BPIF Fine Book Binding Awards and was also lead artist on the first phase of The Point arts centre development at Eastleigh, Hampshire (architects: Burrell Foley Fischer), with phase two following in 2010. 2004 saw Ann Sutton's solo retrospective exhibition by invitation of the Crafts Council, in London and touring, and in 2005 she founded Site Editions (commissioning and selling limited editions of sculpture for gardens), and was made the third Artist Patron of the Contemporary Art Society (with Anthony Caro and Bridget Riley).

=== Clearing the decks ===
In 2010, Ann Sutton removed all the looms from her studio; a radical step for someone who had made an international reputation as a weaver and textile artist. While she had previously pioneered the use of computer-aided looms, she now got rid of them completely. This heralded a new phase of visual research and making, in which she worked increasingly in paint, drawing, and progressing to what she calls "spatial drawing". Her initial work was shown in a solo exhibition: "Counterpoint", curated by Gill Hedley at the Patrick Heide Contemporary Art gallery in London. More new work was unveiled at her invited solo exhibition within "Collect" at the Saatchi Galleries, London in 2015. Increasingly, her studio research and making involved new material combinations, and getting still further away from traditional ideas of support. In 2016 she was shown at "Taste" at Artgenève, and in 2016–17 her solo exhibition "On The Grid" toured UK public galleries, including Gallery Oldham, Lancashire, The Potteries Museum, Stoke-on-Trent, and in 2018 at the Winchester Gallery, University of Southampton. In 2017 Sutton gave the Fielding Talk under the title "Rebel with a Cause" for the Crafts Council, at St Martin in the Fields, London. In 2018 her work was included in "The Most Real Thing: Contemporary Textiles and Sculpture" at the NewArtCentre, Roche Court, Wiltshire, England, who now represent her as an artist. A major solo exhibition: “Ann Sutton: On From Weaving – Works 1955-2021” opened at the NewArtCentre Roche Court in November 2021. In October 2026, Ann Sutton continues to exhibit in Textiles Today? alongside contemporaries and later generations of artists including Jo Barker, Mary Farmer, Amber Fry, Jacob Monk, Eleanor Pritchard, Mary Restieaux, and Jun Tomita at Fen Ditton Gallery, Fen Ditton, Cambridgeshire, England.

Sutton's work is included in public collections in the UK and worldwide including Tate, the Victoria and Albert Museum, City of Leeds Museums (Lotherton Hall), National Museum of Wales, and the Crafts Council.

== Prizes, travel awards, and international work ==
Sutton has travelled extensively as part of her work, often in connection with awards, teaching and consultancies. Highlights include:

- a Royal Society of Arts (R.S.A) scholarship for travel and research in Nigeria and Morocco (1971);
- chairing the Fibre Programme: World Crafts Council conference, Mexico (1975);
- chairing the Miniature Textile convention, University of Athens, Georgia, (1980);
- a lecture tour of Australia on behalf of the Australian Crafts Council and the British Council (1985)
- a lecture tour of U.S.A. and Canada including the Rhode Island Institute of Design (1986); * international judge: Fashion Fabric Design contest, Tokyo (1988 and 1989)
- keynote address: Weavers Guild of America, "Convergence 94", Minneapolis, Minnesota (1994)
- member of the Examining Committee: Textile School, Rhode Island School of Design, (1995)
- awarded the Annual Medal of the Worshipful Company of Weavers "in recognition of her outstanding contribution to the Woven Textile Industry", (2026)
- The Nicholas Fox Weber Prize of the Josef and Anni Albers Foundation, Honorable Mention for work that has "distinguished itself through its remarkable passion and integrity", (2026)

Sutton's design work for industry includes Heal's, Dunn's and Liberty (1966); Crown Wallcoverings (1978); work on ‘The Wales Collection’ for The Wales Craft Council/Welsh Woolen Association (1984-5); and collections for Early's of Witney (1987). In 1989-90, Sutton designed two collections each year with Junichi Arai, Japan, and has undertaken freelance commissions with companies including Ralph Lauren (1990 to present). From 1985, she has been an enthusiastic passenger on container ships and has circled the world four times.

== Ann Sutton Foundation ==
In 1999, she set up the Ann Sutton Foundation, which was housed in premises which Sutton bought and renovated, adjacent to her Arundel studio and home. She had long held that talented young woven textile artists needed a period of guided transition between graduate study and the working world. Consequently, the Foundation set out to provide not only advanced tuition and research, but also the vocational training that would enable them to become professionally self-supporting. The Foundation, supported by the Arts Council, was established as a registered charity with a board of trustees.

Fellowships were awarded competitively for graduates under the age of 29 and in financial need. An early relationship with the Royal College of Art was established and accommodation was provided in addition to a stipend, tuition and studio space. Early fellows included Margo Selby and Laura Thomas. Increasingly, however, art colleges themselves began to adopt aspects of the Ann Sutton Foundation model, and this combined with the high costs and increasing difficulty of attracting philanthropy for the Foundation, led to its closure ten years later, in 2009.

== My Bones Are Woven ==
The documentary film about Sutton: “My Bones Are Woven”, directed by Jane Mote and Joshua Kershaw (UK, 2022, 74 minutes), was screened as part of “Ann Sutton in Words and Film”, staged by the British Library, London, on 18 November 2022. Speakers included Ann Coxon, Curator of International Art at Tate Modern.

== Publications ==
- Sutton, Ann and Pat Holtom. Tablet Weaving. London: Batsford, 1975.
- Sutton, Ann, Peter Collingwood, and Geraldine St. Aubyn Hubbard. The Craft of the Weaver. London: BBC Publications, 1982.
- Sutton, Ann. The Structure of Weaving. London: Hutchinson, 1982.
- Sutton, Ann and Richard Carr. Tartans. London: Bellew Publishing,1984.
- Sutton, Ann. British Craft Textiles. London: Collins, 1985.
- Sutton, Ann. Colour and Weave. London: Bellew Publishing and Asheville, NC: Lark, 1985.
- Sutton, Ann. The Textiles of Wales. London: Bellew Publishing, 1987.
- Sutton, Ann. and Diane Sheehan, Ideas in Weaving. London: Batsford and Asheville, NC: Lark, 1989.
- Sutton, Ann (editor and foreword). Falcot’s Weave Companion, translations by Anne Satow, London: Bellew Publishing,1990.

== Media ==
- The Craft of the Weaver, five parts, writer and presenter, BBC Television series, 1980.
- Show5 Interview with Ann Sutton for the Craft Council 2003 exhibition project
- The Maker’s Voice Interview with Ann Sutton for the Crafts Council's 2016 series
- “My Bones Are Woven”, documentary film about Ann Sutton, directed by Jane Mote and Joshua Kershaw (UK, 2022, 74 minutes).
