= Primavera Gallery =

Arts gallery in Cambridge, England

Coordinates: 52°12′15.8″N 0°7′4″E

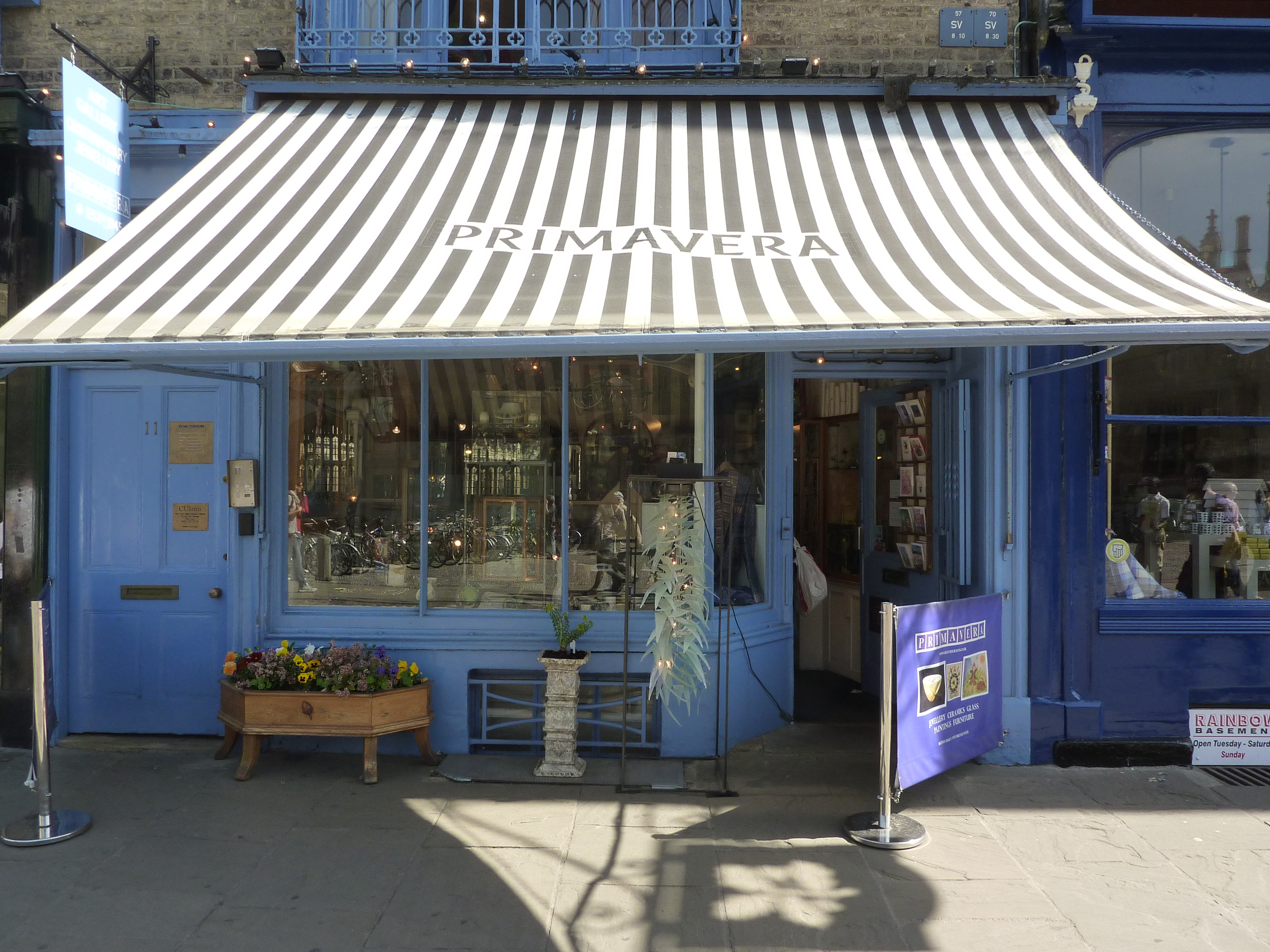
Primavera Gallery

Primavera was a fine arts and crafts gallery at 10 King's Parade in Cambridge, England. Henry Rothschild founded Primavera in 1945 in Sloane Street, London, in order to promote and retail contemporary British art and craft. The Cambridge branch of Primavera was opened in 1959.

== History ==
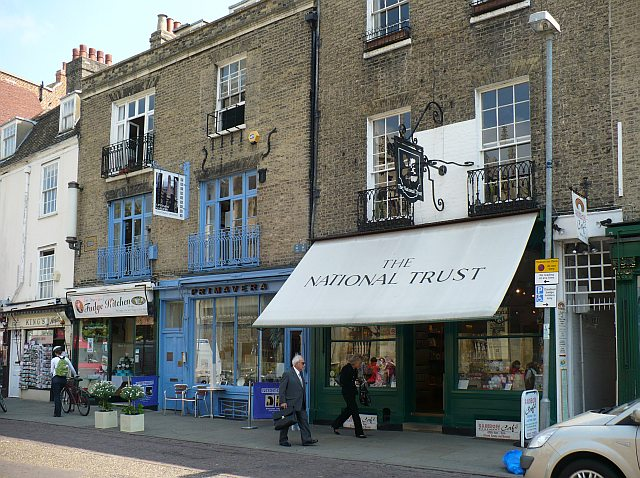
The blue-painted Gallery (left of centre) on King's Parade

Henry Rothschild first became interested in the crafts when he encountered them in Italy in 1944 while on Army service with the Royal Corps of Signals. On his return to England, he researched British crafts and decided to found Primavera in Sloane Street. Primavera offered stoneware by the Winchcombe and Crowan potteries, tin-glaze from the Cole brothers' Rye Pottery, tableware by Lucie Rie, textiles, furniture and basketwork being exhibited and sold. From 1953, Primavera developed an exhibition programme showing continental ceramics, toys, sculpture and folk art. The reputation of the gallery enabled Rothschild to promote arts education in schools and to support museums and local authorities in putting together art and craft collections.

The Cambridge branch of Primavera was opened in 1959, when Rothschild took over a shop formerly run by the Cambridge Society of Designer-Craftsmen on King's Parade. The interior was refitted by Gordon and Ursula Bowyer and the basement redesigned as a textile showroom. Marion Goodwin and Valerie Webb were appointed as managers and focused on sourcing local crafts. The upstairs gallery space at 11 King's Parade was once home to Charles Lamb, the poet and essayist, along with his sister Mary in 1819.

In 1965, the Viewpoint 1965 exhibition held at the gallery featured Geoffrey Clarke (sculpture and stained glass), Mary Potter (paintings), and Dan Arbeid (ceramics).

In 1999, Jeremy Waller, purchased the gallery. Waller returned to Cambridge (where he was previously a student) after spending many years working and travelling in Europe, the Middle East and Africa. Since 1999, Primavera had been remodelled to accommodate more work on three floors of the King's Parade site. Primavera represented more than 500 UK makers, exhibited in the Grade II-listed galleries on King's Parade. Waller and his wife Sheila have also dedicated a significant part of their home and grounds at College Farm, Haddenham, Cambridgeshire (ex-Gonville and Caius College), to housing a permanent collection of work by UK artists.

In 2001 Waller revived the connection between the Fitzwilliam Museum and Primavera by staging a joint exhibition entitled "Ceramics and Glass". New works by Alan Caiger-Smith and Peter Layton were shown. Primavera had received commissions from Cambridge University to design and craft pieces for colleges, including a pair of wooden candlesticks for St Catharine's College turned by Guy Ravine in 2008. Primavera displayed jewellery by the late Barbara Christie.

Numbers 10 and 11, King's Parade are a Grade II listed building.

In 2026, Primavera closed its King's Parade gallery, and moved to new premises at College Farm, Haddenham.

== Bibliography ==
- Fisher, Sue. "Gallery with a difference". Cambridgeshire Life, July 2003. Pages 94–96.
- De Bruyne, John. "John de Bruyne's entrepreneur's view". Cambridge News, May 2007.
- Greg, Andrew. "Primavera: Pioneering Craft and Design 1945–1995”. Newcastle upon Tyne: Tyne and Wear Museums, 1995.
- Hobday, Alan, and Loxston, Rob. “The Fitzwilliam and Primavera: Ceramics and Glass”. Somerset: Field Print and Graphics Ltd, 2001.
- Crossley-Holland, Joan. “Contemporary Crafts”. British Art and Antique Year book 1985. Pages 71–74.
- Gartner, Peter J. “Art and Architecture: Musée d'Orsay". Oldenburg, Germany: Barnes and Noble, 2001.
- Cerver Francisco Asensio. “Interior Design Atlas”. Colgne: Konemann, 2000.
