= Crafts Council =

United Kingdom charity for craft

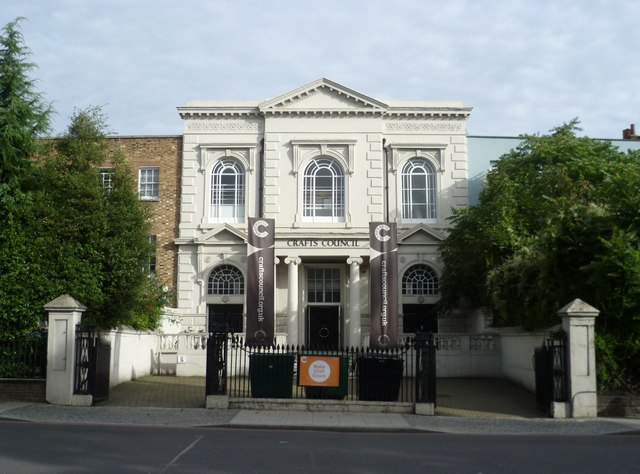
The Crafts Council building in Pentonville Road, London

The Crafts Council is the national development agency for contemporary craft in the United Kingdom, and is funded by Arts Council England.

== History ==
The Crafts Advisory Committee was formed in 1971 to advise the Minister for the Arts, David Eccles, 1st Viscount Eccles, ‘on the needs of the artist craftsman and to promote a nation-wide interest and improvement in their products’. Its first meeting was held on 6 October 1971 at the Council of Industrial Design (later the Design Council). It was later chaired by Sir Paul Sinker.

In 1973, the Committee purchased Waterloo Place, London. It began publishing the journal Crafts. It also held its first exhibition, The Craftsman's Art (1973) at the Victoria and Albert Museum, accompanied by publication of the exhibition catalog of the same name. In 1974, it launched the Crafts Advisory Committee Index, an information service for and about craftspeople.

In April 1979 the Crafts Advisory Committee was renamed the Crafts Council. In 1982, the organisation was granted a Royal Charter and became independent of the Design Council.

In 1991, the Crafts Council moved to 44a Pentonville Road, London, the former Claremont Chapel (1819), where premises included a reference library, a shop, a café, an education workshop and a gallery space. In 1999 it became a funded organisation of the Arts Council of Great Britain (later the Arts Council of England).

In 2006, the Crafts Council decreased its on-site activity and closed the gallery, shop, education workshop and café in order for the Crafts Council to increase its regional activity via partnership working.

In 2011, its 40th anniversary year, over 400,000 visitors saw its five temporary exhibitions, 27,000 people attended its craft fairs, and over 7,000 children and young people participated in its nationwide initiatives.

== Funding ==
The Crafts Council is supported by Arts Council England.

The Crafts Council is also supported by a number of trusts and foundations and private patrons who support touring exhibitions, professional development schemes and participation and learning programmes. All meet the aims and objectives of charitable organisations supporting the arts.

== People ==
The Crafts Council is made up of a number of specialist teams, reflecting the various aspects of its work, and is overseen by a Senior Management Team, and ultimately a board of Trustees.

== Exhibition Space ==
Exhibition space is now principally utilised for externally funded exhibitions, however this was not always the case. Major tours of work from the collection, or of work which sometimes were acquired to became part of the collection were more common in the early days of the newly formed Crafts Council. Examples are shown below.

=== At the 12 Waterloo Place Gallery of the Crafts Council ===
- The Maker’s Eye (1982)
  - Selectors: Alison Britton, Michael Cardew, Emmanuel Cooper, Mary Farmer, Erik de Graff, David Kindersley, John Makepeace, Enid Marx, Malcolm Parsons, Alan Peters, David Pye, Connie Stephenson, David Watkins, Michael Brennand-Wood
- A trio of A Closer look exhibitions (1983–5), organised by Peter Dormer which started with concurrently run exhibitions at the Waterloo Place Gallery of the Crafts Council. The tour tended to separate the three themes for practicality of space.
  - A closer look at rugs
  - A closer look at Lettering
  - A closer look at Wood
- A Collection in the Making (1985)
- Goodbye Piccadilly (1991)

=== At the Pentonville Road Gallery of the Crafts Council ===
- Inaugural exhibition at the gallery: Beyond the Dovetail - craft, skill and imagination
  - Curator: Peter Dormer
  - Artists: Gordon Baldwin, Svend Bayer,Stella Benjamin, Clive Bowen, Alison Britton, Mary Farmer, Michael Flemming, Gerda Flockinger, Neal French, Sally Freshwater, Caroline Broadhead, Sandy Brown, David Garland, Lucy Goffin, Victoria Brown, Sally Greaves-Lord, Mary Bunce, Jane Hamlyn, Will & Sebastian Carter, Walter Keeler, Mick Casson, Jacqueline Mina, Joanna Constantinidis, Ian Mortimer, Joel Degen, Pierre Degan, Steven Newell, Colin Pearson, David Drew, Alan Peters, Philip Eglin, William Phipps, David Pye, Wendy Ramshaw, Mary Restieaux, Michael Rowe, Janice Tchalenko, Richard La Trobe-Bateman, Audrey Walker, David Watkins, Robert Welch, Helen Yardley, Takeshi Yasuda, Andrew & Joanna Young and pieces from the Craft Council Collection
  - Tour: Northern Gallery for Contemporary Art, Sunderland; Aberystwyth Arts Centre; Tullie House Museum, Carlisle; The City Gallery, Leicester
- Maker’s Eye: Stories of Craft (2021)
  - Selectors: Assemble (Amica Dall & Giles Smith), Michael Brennand-Wood, Caroline Broadhead, Neil Brownsword, Dr Christine Checinska, John Grayson, Ineke Hans, Angela James, Michael Marriott, James Maskrey, Freddie Robins. Matt Smith, Esna Su, Simone ten Hompel

== Crafts Magazine ==
From 1973 - 2025 Crafts Magazine was a key part of the Crafts community in the United Kingdom, the communication has been moved to the website of the Crafts Council and members notified in 2025. Archives continue to be available to members and institutions.

== Collect Art Fair ==
This Art Fair has become one of the major events in London, England each year, usually set in the magnificent venue of Somerset House on the Strand. Historically it has also been set at the Saatchi Gallery on the Kings Road in London

== Archives ==
- "The work of the Crafts Advisory Committee, 1971 - 1974 - Papers concerning the establishment and affairs of the Crafts Council - Society of Designer-Craftsmen : records - Archives Hub". V&A Archive of Art and Design.
