= List of works and exhibitions by Pauline Burbidge =

This is a partial list of works and exhibitions by the British textile artist, designer and quiltmaker Pauline Burbidge (born 1950), with links to images where available. Burbidge's works are held in public and private collections in the UK and US. She has shown in solo and shared exhibitions worldwide.

== Works ==
=== Public collections ===
- Aberdeen Archives, Gallery and Museums, Aberdeen:
  - Aberdeen Study IV (2001)
- Benjamin Britten High School, Lowestoft:
  - Ship-Shape (1988)
- Coats Crafts UK:
  - Under the Waterfall (2004)
- The Bowes Museum, Barnard Castle, County Durham:
  - Plantforms (2020)
  - Global Horizon (2020)
- Crafts Council Collections, London:
  - Pyramid II (1980)
- Embroiderers' Guild Collection, London:
  - Circular Series No. 5 (1984)
- Glasgow Museums Collections, Glasgow:
  - Intercut Fish-Harmony (1991)
- International Quilt Museum, University of Nebraska–Lincoln, Nebraska:
  - Big Bluestem (2025)
  - Horizon 2003 (2003)
  - The Waterfall (2003)
  - Wind over Water (2003)
  - Joining Forces II (1991)
  - Art Nouveau Quilt (1981)
- Ardis and Robert James Collection, donated in 1997 to the International Quilt Study Center and Museum, University of Nebraska–Lincoln, Nebraska:
  - The Pink Teapot (1987)
  - Hen Quilt (1986)
  - Spirals II (1985)
  - Spirals I (1985)
  - Eternal Triangle (1983)
  - Finn (1983)
- National Museums of Scotland Collection, Edinburgh:
  - Dancing Lines (1998)
- North West Thames Regional Health Authority:
  - Chequered Cube (1982)
- Nottingham Castle Museum (Textiles Collection), Nottingham:
  - Reflections (1993)
  - Sink or Swim (1991)
  - Sweetlips II (1989)
  - Off Centre Log Cabin (1981)
  - Pyramid I (1980)
  - Day Lily (1976)
- Old Library Theatre Company and Arts Centre, Mansfield:
  - Canopy II (1990)
  - Striped Canopy (1990)
- Paintings in Hospitals Scotland (PIH), Edinburgh:
  - Matt & Bowl (paper collage) (1991)
  - Barrels (paper collage) (1991)
  - 3 Fish & Stripe (paper collage) (1991)
- The Quilters' Guild Museum Collection, York:
  - Honesty Skyline (2015)
  - Honesty Quilt (2003)
  - Aberdeen I (1999)
  - Colourbank (1998)
  - Fish Dance I (1992)
  - Fish Out of Water (1991)
  - Small Zigzag Quilt (1986)
- Ruskin Gallery, Sheffield:
  - Floating Triangles (1983)
- Sheffield Galleries and Museums Trust, Sheffield:
  - Blue Fish (fabric collage) (1986), Art for Schools Collection
- Shipley Art Gallery, Gateshead:
  - Lindisfarne Revisited (2011), part funded by the national Art Fund
  - Mirrored Steps (1983)
- Ulster Folk Museum, Co. Down:
  - Custard Squash II (1989)
- Victoria and Albert Museum, London:
  - Kate's Vase (1987)
- The Whitworth, Manchester:
  - Joining Forces (1989)

=== Private collections ===
Many of Burbidge's works are held in private collections, including the John M. Walsh III Collection of Contemporary Art Quilts in Martinsville, New Jersey, which holds:

- Feather Collection II (2003)]
- Millennium Quilt (2000)
- Tweed Reflections II (1995)
- Nottingham Reflections (1994)

Other works in private collections include:

- In Honour of Hugo (2024)
- Plantlife Puglia (2021)
- Re-told Stories: Pitt Rivers Legacy (2020)
- Plantlines (2019)
- Fern Strata (2019)
- Hedges & Edges (2017)
- Wheat & Barley Fields (2016)
- Starscape (2015)
- Horizons of Puglia (2012)
- Windows on Puglia (2011)
- Applecross Quilt (2007)
- Boatday / Contemplation (2004)
- Climbing the Waterfall (2003)
- Feather Collection II (2003)
- Feather Collection I (2003)
- Pittenweem Quilt (2002)
- Millennium Quilt (2000)
- Angela's Garden III (1997)
- Colour Study I (1997)
- Paxton Study II (1997)
- Paxton Study I (1997)
- Black and White Feathers (1996)
- Tone (1996)
- Tweed Reflections II (1995)
- Whiteadder (1995)
- Nottingham Reflections (1994)
- Red Grid (1993)
- Reflections III (1993)
- Heartbeat (1993)
- The Pink Fish (1991)
- Sweet Lips (1991)
- Custard Squash (1989)
- Limited Run Quilt (1989)
- Diagonal Zig-Zag (1987)
- Still Life I (1986)
- Black and White Bars II (1986)
- Stripey Step I (1984)
- Cubic Pyramid (1983)]
- Liquorice Allsorts (1983)
- The Final Pyramid (1982)
- Cubic Log Cabin (1982)
- Heron II (1981, quilted 1986)
- Heron (1981)
- Egyptian Quilt Two (1979)
- Large Fruit Basket (1979)
- Egyptian Scarab (1978)
- Ducks (1978)
- Flying Ducks (1977)
- Korky the Cat (1977)

== Exhibitions ==
- 2024: In Honour of Hugo shown at Norham Arts Festival, Northumberland
- 2024: Side by Side (with Charles Poulsen), Pittenweem Arts Festival 2024, Pittenweem, Fife
- 2023: In Tandem (with Charles Poulsen), Hughson Gallery, Glasgow
- 2022: DRAWING PARALLELS (with Charles Poulsen), Ruthin Craft Centre, Ruthin
- 2021–2022: Quilts: Resurgence, The Granary Gallery, Berwick-upon-Tweed (also co-curated)
- 2020: Plantlife, Fen Ditton Gallery, Cambridge
- 2017–2018: Songs for Winter (with Charles Poulsen), City Art Centre, Edinburgh
- 2016–2017: Quiltscapes by Pauline Burbidge, International Quilt Museum, University of Nebraska–Lincoln
- 2015–2016: Pauline Burbidge. Quiltscapes & Quiltline, The Bowes Museum, Barnard Castle, County Durham and Ruthin Craft Centre, Ruthin
- 2012: PB Retro: Interpretations in Cloth, a major solo retrospective exhibition organised by the Festival of Quilts, shown at the National Exhibition Centre, Birmingham, and then at The Quilt Museum and Gallery, York
- 2010: European Contemporary Art Quilt Exhibition, Musée d'art et d'histoire de Neuchâtel, Neuchâtel, Switzerland
- 2010: Quilts 1700–2010, Victoria and Albert Museum, London
- 2009:Quilty Secrets, Winchester Discovery Centre, Winchester, Hampshire
- 2008: 5th Main-Quiltfestival, Aschaffenburg, Germany
- 2008: Quilts in Time: journey from bed to wall, The Quilt Museum and Gallery, York
- 2008: Loch Lomond Quilt Show, several locations
- 2008: Monochrome, The Lund Gallery, North Yorkshire
- 2008: On the Map, Millennium Gallery, Sheffield
- 2007: Materials of Choice (with Charles Poulsen), Chenderit School, Oxfordshire
- 2006: Ettrick Riverside, Selkirk, Scottish Borders
- 2004–2011: Festival of Quilts, National Exhibition Centre, Birmingham, UK
- 2004–2005: QUILTWORKS–Visions of the Natural World (solo), toured Shipley Art Gallery, Gateshead; The Knitting and Stitching Show, London, Dublin and Harrogate; Royal Museum and Art Gallery, Canterbury; Collins Gallery, Glasgow; Bankfield Museum, Halifax
- 2003: 30 / 30 Vision, Crafts Council, London and toured
- 2001: Ground Cover: Contemporary Quilts, Mattie Kelly Arts Center, Niceville, Florida
- 2000–2001: North Country Quilts, The Bowes Museum, Barnard Castle, County Durham
- 2000–2001: British Contemporary Quilts, Matsuzakaya Department Stores, Nagoya, Tokyo, Osaka, Japan
- 2000: European Patchwork Meeting (solo), Sainte-Marie-aux-Mines, Alsace, France
- 1998–1999: Take 4: New Perspectives on the British Art Quilt, Whitworth Art Gallery, Manchester and toured
- 1998: The World Quilt '98, Tokyo, Japan
- 1997: Quilt Week, Yokohama, Japan
- 1993: Joining Forces (with Charles Poulsen), Angel Row Gallery, Nottingham
- 1992: New Wave Quilts – Collection II, toured Japan, organised by Setsuko Segawa
- 1991: Quilts Now, Zephyr Gallery, Louisville, Kentucky
- 1991: The Works Gallery (solo), Philadelphia, Pennsylvania
- 1989: Costume & Textile Museum (solo), Nottingham
- 1989: Ruskin Art Gallery (solo), Sheffield
- 1988: Quilt Art, Nottingham Castle Museum, Nottingham
- 1987: Wall to Wall, The Corner House Gallery, Manchester and toured
- 1987: Quilt Art (mixed show), (Cooper Gallery, Barnsley
- 1987: The Contemporary Textile Gallery, London
- 1987: Quilt National '87, Athens, Ohio
- 1986: Threads, Aldeburgh, Suffolk
- 1986: The Art Quilt, Los Angeles Municipal Art Gallery, Los Angeles, California, and toured seven other locations over its three-year run
- 1986: Artists in Industry, Nottingham Castle Museum, Nottingham
- 1985: Wall Hung Textiles, British Crafts Centre, London
- 1985: National exhibition, Dublin
- 1985: Quilt National '85, Athens, Ohio
- 1985: Five Makers, British Crafts Centre, London
- 1984: Chelsea Crafts Fair, London
- 1984: Contemporary Quilt Show, The Art Collector, California
- 1984: Maker Designers Today, Camden Art Centre, London
- 1983, 1985, 1987, 1991, 1993: Quilt National, The Dairy Barn Arts Center, Athens, Ohio
- 1983: Fabric Construction–The Art Quilt, Michael James Selection, Worcester, Massachusetts
- 1983: Quilting, Patchwork and Appliqué, The Minories, Colchester
- 1983–1984: New Patchwork Quilts by Pauline Burbidge (solo), Nottingham and Sunderland
- 1983: New Quilts, Lady Lodge Arts Centre, Peterborough
- 1982: Crafts Council, London
- 1981–1983: The Quilters' Guild National
- 1981: Gibraltar (solo), invitation through the Crafts Council
- 1979: Patchwork Quilts (solo), Foyle's Art Gallery, London
