= Pauline Burbidge =

British textile artist, designer and quiltmaker (born 1950)

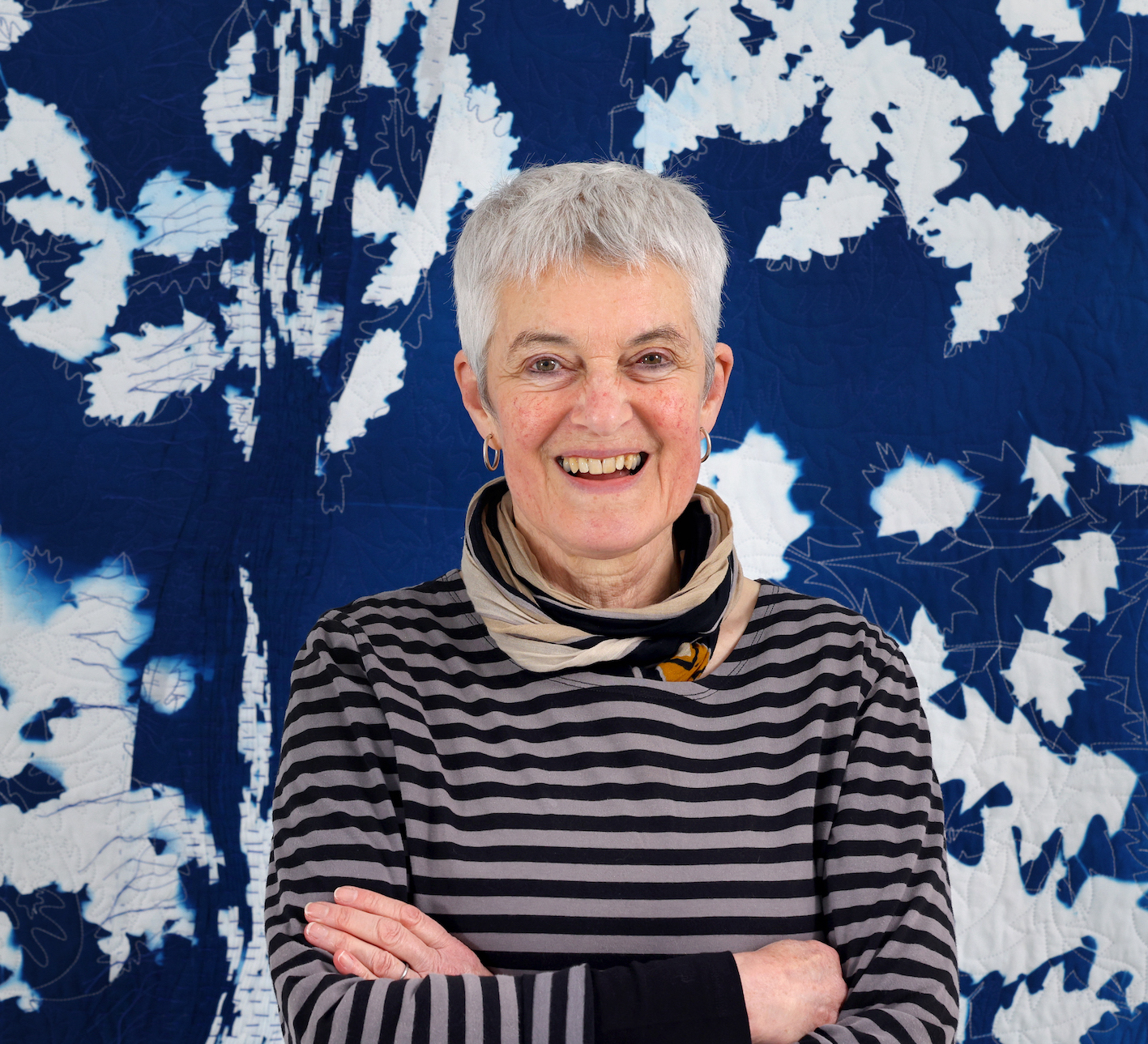
- Born: 8 May 1950 (age 76); Melbury Osmond, Dorset, England
- Education: Yeovil College; London College of Fashion; Saint Martin's School of Art (DipAD)
- Known for: Textile art, quiltmaking
- Spouse: Charles Poulsen (m. 1993)
- Website: Official website

Pauline Burbidge (born 8 May 1950) is a British textile artist, designer, and quiltmaker, known for her work in contemporary art quilting. Starting in the mid-1970s, she transitioned from a background in fashion and garment design to contemporary textiles, where she was a contributor to the development of the studio art quilt. She has been described by curators and historians as an influential figure in contemporary art quilting.

Her stylistic focus has shifted during her career, beginning with high-contrast, three-dimensional geometric illusions in the 1980s before moving toward more expressive, collage-based works. Her mature practice synthesises traditional stitch-work with fine art techniques such as painting, laminating, collage, cyanotype printing, and photograms. Her work is frequently inspired by the natural world, especially the seasonal changes, landscapes and botanical forms observed near her home in the Scottish Borders.

A frequent exhibitor, she was the only non-American artist invited to the seminal 1986 exhibition The Art Quilt in Los Angeles, an event credited with defining the "cutting edge" of the movement. Her work is held in major public collections worldwide, including the Victoria and Albert Museum, the Whitworth Art Gallery, the National Museums of Scotland, and the International Quilt Museum in Nebraska.

She is a founding and honorary member of The Quilters' Guild of the British Isles, and an associate member of the International Quilt Museum. She has been described by critics as one of the most consistently innovative quiltmakers in the United Kingdom, and one of the leading quilt artists in the world.

== Early life and education ==
Pauline Burbidge was born in Melbury Osmond, Dorset. Her formal art education began at Yeovil Technical College where she studied art and design from 1967 to 1969. She next enrolled in the fashion course at the London College of Fashion, where she completed a diploma in 1970. She then transferred to Saint Martin's School of Art in London for a course with a greater focus on creative textile work, where she completed an advanced diploma in Fashion and Textiles in 1973.

== Career ==
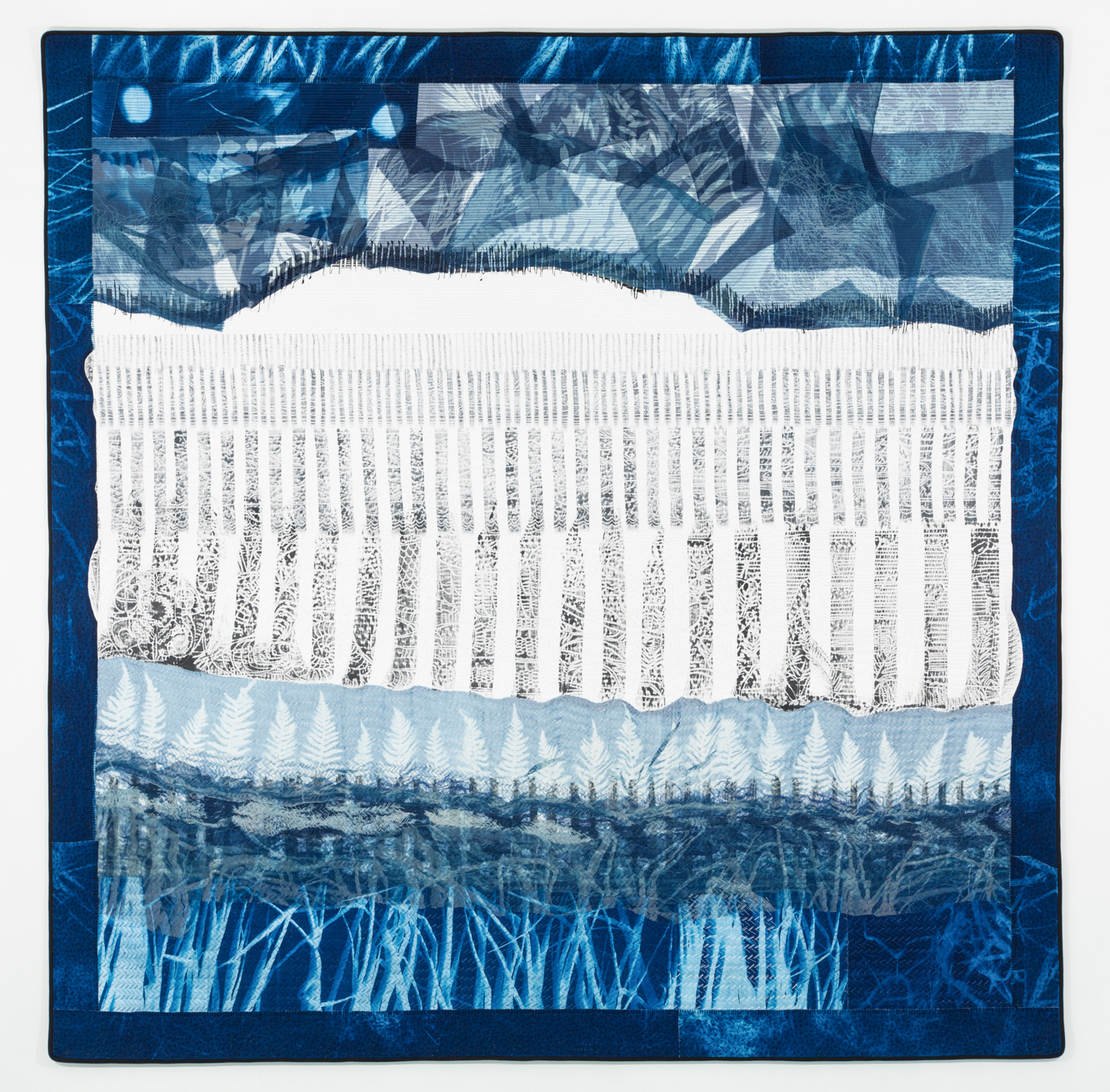
Global Horizon (2020), quilt, 202 cm × 205 cm (80 in × 81 in), in the collection of the Bowes Museum

=== 1970s–early 1980s: early career ===
After art school, Burbidge worked in garment design for four years, but became disillusioned with the fashion world. In the 1970s young artists had "discovered" quilts and began experimenting with contemporary styles. In 1975 she became inspired by antique quilts: despite no formal training in quilting, she began to combine traditional quiltmaking techniques with her art-school education in drawing, colour, line, and abstraction, becoming an early contributor to the art quilt form, focusing on one-off quilts as artworks rather than strictly functional objects. For two years, she worked for half the week as a freelance pattern cutter to finance her creative work, and spent the rest of her time on patchwork, writing a book on the subject in 1981.

Her first quilts were designed and made to traditional American block forms; from 1975 to the early 1980s, she concentrated primarily on pictorial and figurative imagery, exploring traditional quilting techniques. She then started to design using her own ideas, notably quilts based on Ancient Egyptian art for a major commission, using drawings she made in the British Museum. Her use of repeated blocks then progressed into kaleidoscope-inspired patterns. From the beginning she chose to sew both by machine and hand; she also became a skilled dyer, due to the unavailability of suitable plain-coloured cotton fabrics.

She was an early and active figure in the contemporary quilting movement in Britain, and in 1979 she was a founder member of The Quilters' Guild of the British Isles.

=== 1980s–1990s ===
In 1981 Burbidge moved to Nottingham, where her work shifted towards three-dimensional illusions and geometric designs.

In 1982, she received the "John Ruskin Craft Award" (administered by the Crafts Council), enabling her to produce new work for an exhibition. In the catalogue she wrote, "Although I have been making quilts for nearly eight years, I still feel very excited by the potential of this medium and feel that this work is just the tip of the iceberg."

She won an "Award of Excellence" twice at the American Quilt National Exhibition in 1983 for Cubic Pyramid and Cubic Log Cabin, and was subsequently invited to participate in the Fabric Construction–The Art Quilt exhibition in Worcester, Massachusetts by Michael James, an early leader of the Studio Quilt movement. The collectors Ardis and Robert James purchased six of her quilts during the 1980s, and later donated them to the International Quilt Study Center and Museum (now the International Quilt Museum) in Lincoln, Nebraska.

In 1985, she was one of eight founder members of Quilt Art, an exhibiting group of textile artists promoting the quilt as a form of contemporary art.

She was asked to make a quilt for the 1986 Los Angeles exhibition The Art Quilt, curated by Penny McMorris and Michael Kile, where the quilts exhibited were intended to be seen as works of visual art. Robert Shaw, author of the most complete published study of quilt art, writes that this exhibition "defined the cutting edge of the new art quilt movement and identified its leading practitioners", noting that she was the only non-American artist invited to participate.

A 1988 lecture tour in Australia introduced her to tropical fish and the rhythms of moving water, and she was inspired by the illustrations in Leni Riefenstahl's book Coral Gardens to start a new series based on stripes and fish.

=== 1990s–present ===
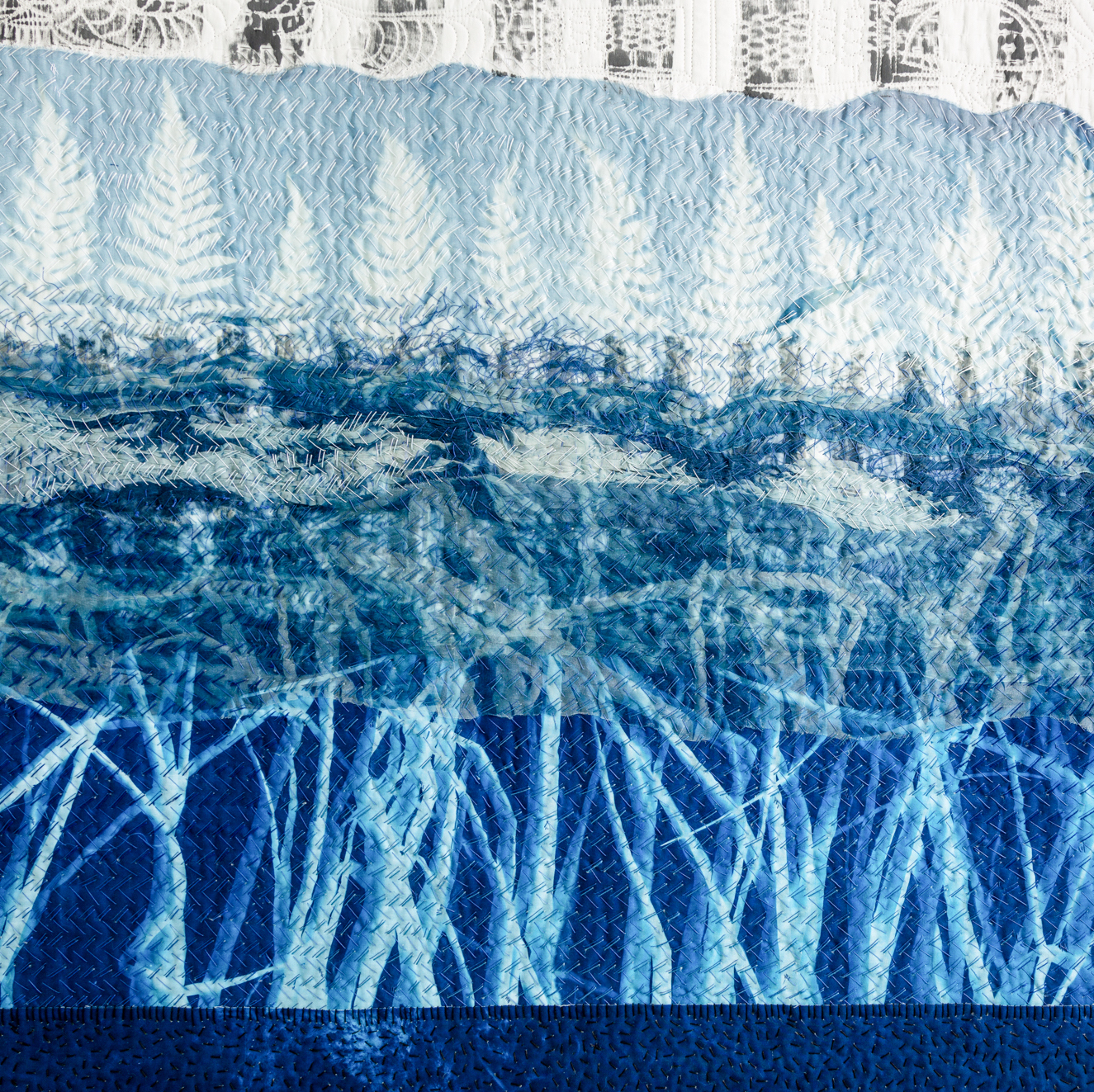
Detail of Global Horizon (2020)

In 1993, Burbidge was commissioned by the collector John M. Walsh III to make a quilt based on the theme of water; after completing the work she said, "This has not only changed my work, but it has also changed the way I do my work. I now have enough new ideas to last me for the next ten years."

After relocating her home and studio from Nottingham to the Scottish Borders in 1993, her work moved towards more expressive, collage-based compositions incorporating printed, stitched, and drawn elements, often reproducing multiple images from the landscape, water and nature around her home, translating her observations of skies, fields, water reflections and vegetation into layered cloth studies. The surface of each piece is created using collage, mark making, stitching, and subtle tonal juxtapositions. Her designs moved from "hard-edged shapes to free-form collages", inspired by the natural environment. She replaced dyeing with painting her fabrics, and her palette simplified to fewer colours, mainly blue, black, red, and white.

In the mid-2000s, the International Quilt Museum purchased three additional pieces. With the donation from the Ardis and Robert James Collection, the museum holds the largest collection of her work in the world.

In 2004, she was made an honorary member of The Quilters' Guild, and in 2006 an associate member of the International Quilt Museum.

In 2005, as an alternative to her large Quiltscapes studio quilts, she developed Quiltline, a more commercial series of functional, usable and sometimes smaller quilts. Quiltscapes are time-consuming, intensely considered and layered artworks; Quiltline are more spontaneous pieces which she compares to drawings.

In addition to her continuing to exhibit and undertake commissions, between 1994 and 2022 she and her husband held 29 annual or biennial Open Studio exhibitions at their home with invited guest artists, thereafter turning to more casual events.

== Style and technique ==
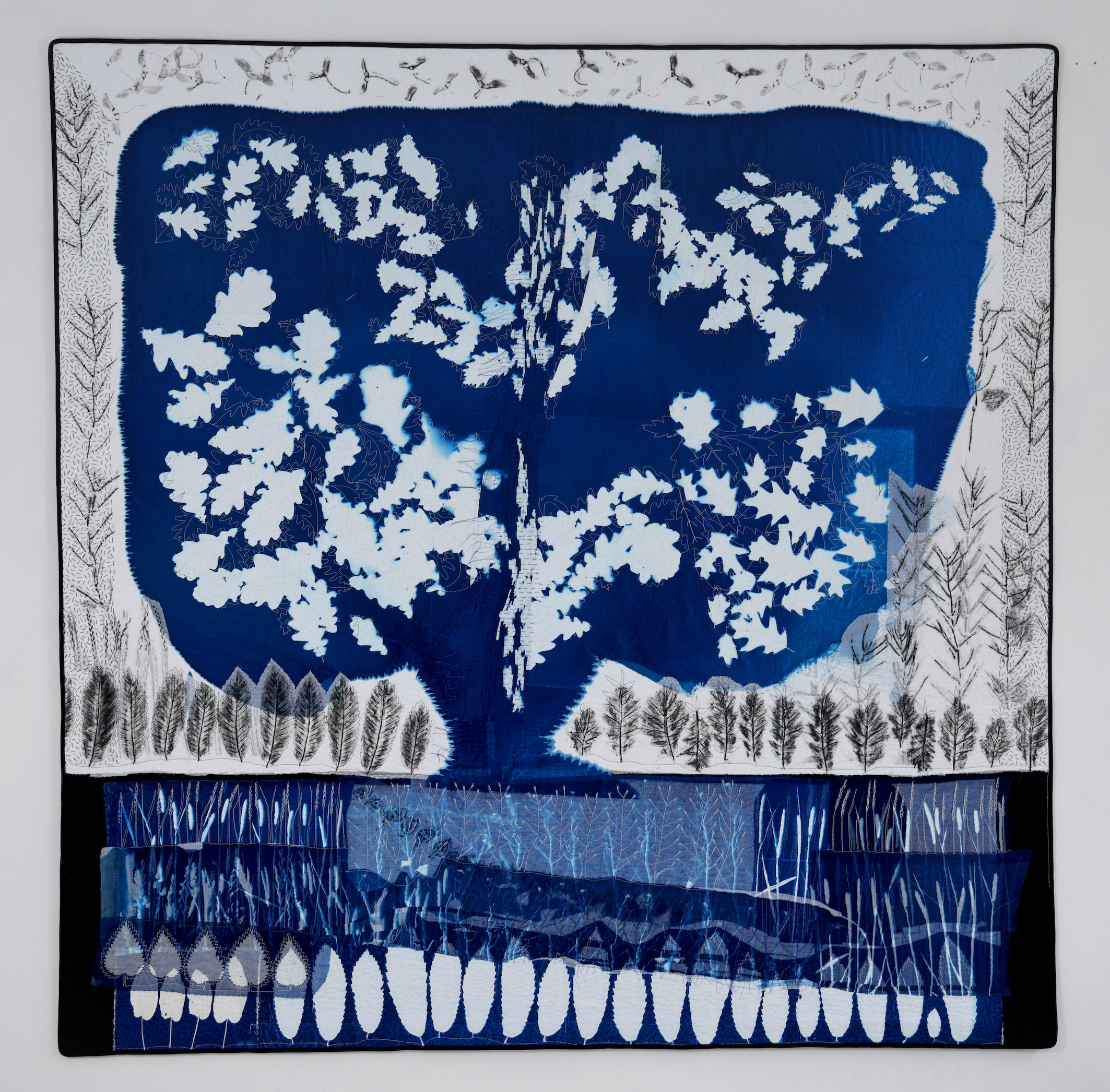
In Honour of Hugo (2024), quilt, 197 cm × 198 cm (78 in × 78 in), dedicated to Hugo Burge and the Hugo Burge Foundation.

According to textile curator June Hill, while Burbidge's early work stressed strong geometric composition, her later work emphasises atmospheric colour and layered botanical forms. Martha Sielman, executive director of art quilt advocacy group Studio Art Quilt Associates, observed in 2008 that while Burbidge's "early geometric pieced work was based on formal repetition, albeit in very complex ways, in her later work, the blocks are more akin to storyboards, where each repetition signals a change."

Dr Jennifer Harris, former deputy director and curator of textiles at the Whitworth Art Gallery in Manchester, England, comments:

When Burbidge began her career as a quilt-maker, in the mid-1970s, she thought and behaved like the designer she had trained as, carefully working out designs in advance of stitching, using paper designs and templates. Today she works in a free, intuitive and much more organic way, producing material and aesthetic responses to landscape that align her far more closely with developments that have taken place in textile art more broadly over this period. Using fabric, paint, stitch and texture as an expressive medium, she conjures up abstract imagery to convey powerful emotion and an overwhelming sense of place…the lyricism of her most recent body of work and her command of the visual language she deploys are the thrilling outcome.

Her mature studio pieces are both practical quilts and textile wall hangings: large-scale, unique, one-off wall hangings, typically measuring up to 2 m (6.6 ft) square, which can take six to ten months to complete. Her practice synthesises traditional quiltmaking techniques (piecing, batting, quilting) with her skills as a pattern cutter and with mixed-media approaches, including appliqué, dyeing, painting and laminating, to create "textile landscapes". Her surfaces often begin as collaged fabric panels that are further developed by drawing with stitch. Since 2005, she has made extensive use of the longarm sewing machine, which has transformed quilting over the last 25 years. She uses both hand and machine embroidery to articulate line and texture, and she experiments with printing to introduce subtle patterning and tonal fields. Photograms printed via cyanotype allow her to reproduce multiple images from nature, often incorporating found objects such as feathers and leaves. Over time she has also introduced other surface techniques into her process. Curators emphasise her ability to maintain quiltmaking's structural logic while pursuing the expressive concerns of contemporary textile art.

== Critical assessment ==
Burbidge has been described by curators and historians of textiles as an important figure in contemporary British art quiltmaking and one of the UK's premier textile artists. In 2001, Threads magazine called her "probably the best-known and most celebrated art quilter in the United Kingdom". She has received grants and support from the Crafts Council and the Scottish Arts Council, and has been invited to give lectures and participate in curated projects internationally. Reviews of contemporary quilting in Britain cite her as a figure who has helped professionalise and expand the expressive range of quiltmaking. Quilt artist and author Michele Walker notes she is unusual in that, "financially, [she] ... is one of the few professional quiltmakers in her own country."

She is also described as one of the few European artists to have had a significant influence on the American art quilt movement. Dr Jennifer Harris regards her as "one of the UK's most consistently innovative quiltmakers. Her continual reinvention of quiltmaking traditions has made her an important catalyst in the development of the art quilt both here and in the U.S.A." According to American quilt expert and author Robert Shaw, "Pauline Burbidge is unquestionably one of the leading quilt artists in the world, and the only non-American artist who has had a major impact on the art quilt movement". Carolyn Ducey, curator of collections at the International Quilt Museum, describes her as "one of the top artists in the world".

== Collections ==
Burbidge's textiles are held in numerous public and private collections. In the US, the International Quilt Museum maintains the most significant repository of her work, including Big Bluestem (2025) and several others, and pieces from the Ardis and Robert James Collection. The John M. Walsh III Collection of Contemporary Art Quilts in Martinsville, New Jersey also holds several of her works.

In the UK, her work is represented in national institutions such as the Victoria and Albert Museum (Kate's Vase, 1987), and the National Museums of Scotland (Dancing Lines, 1998). Regional holdings include The Whitworth in Manchester (Joining Forces, 1989), the Bowes Museum in County Durham (Plantforms, 2020; Global Horizon, 2025), and the Nottingham Castle Museum (Reflections, 1993), which also holds several of her early 1980s geometric pieces. Other notable collections include the Crafts Council (Pyramid II, 1980); The Quilters' Guild Museum Collection in York (Honesty Skyline, 2015, and others); the Shipley Art Gallery (Lindisfarne Revisited, 2011; Mirrored Steps, 1983); and the Aberdeen Archives, Gallery and Museums (Aberdeen Study IV, 2001).

== Exhibitions ==
Burbidge's quilts have been shown in solo and group exhibitions in the UK, Europe, USA, and Japan. including:

- 2022: DRAWING PARALLELS (with Charles Poulsen), Ruthin Craft Centre, Ruthin
- 2017–2018: Songs for Winter (with Charles Poulsen), City Art Centre, Edinburgh
- 2016–2017: Quiltscapes by Pauline Burbidge, International Quilt Museum, University of Nebraska–Lincoln
- 2015–2016: Pauline Burbidge. Quiltscapes & Quiltline, The Bowes Museum, Barnard Castle, County Durham and Ruthin Craft Centre, Ruthin
- 2012: PB RETRO: Interpretations in Cloth, a major solo retrospective exhibition organised by the Festival of Quilts, shown at the National Exhibition Centre, Birmingham, and then at The Quilt Museum and Gallery, York
- 1986: The Art Quilt, Los Angeles Municipal Art Gallery, Los Angeles, California, and toured seven other locations
- 1979: Patchwork Quilts (solo), Foyles Art Gallery, London

== Lectures, teaching and curating ==
Burbidge has lectured, taught and led workshops around the United Kingdom, including working for Loughborough College of Art, the Victoria and Albert Museum, and West Dean College, West Sussex, and also overseas, with residencies in the US, Italy, Japan and Australia. For many years Burbidge ran drawing workshops in Puglia, Italy, with Charles Poulsen. She has also curated or co-curated several exhibitions, including Contemporary American Quilts (Crafts Council, 1993), and Quilts: Resurgence (The Granary Gallery, Berwick-upon-Tweed, 2021–2022).

== Personal life ==
Burbidge moved from London to Brighton in 1980. In 1981, she relocated to Nottingham, and rented a studio in the Lace Market. In 1993 she moved to Allanbank Mill Steading in the Scottish Borders, which she and her husband converted to a home and studio. She has collaborated, exhibited and taught with her husband, sculptor and drawing artist Charles Poulsen.

== Publications ==
- Burbidge, Pauline; Poulsen, Charles (2017). Songs for Winter (booklet accompanying exhibition at the City Art Centre, Edinburgh). Allanbank Mill Steading.
- Burbidge, Pauline (2015). Pauline Burbidge: Quiltscapes & Quiltline (foreword by Joanna Hashagen & Philip Hughes; essay by June Hill). Ruthin Craft Centre & The Bowes Museum. ISBN 978--1-905865-76-5.
- Burbidge, Pauline; Poulsen, Charles (2014). Open Studio–Allanbank Mill Steading 1994–2014. Allanbank Mill Steading.
- Burbidge, Pauline (2012). Pauline Burbidge – Works Between 1975 & 2012 (booklet accompanying PB Retro: Interpretations in Cloth exhibition. twistedthread. ISBN 9780952455936.
- Burbidge, Pauline (2009). Studio Quilts & Quiltline. Allanbank Mill Steading.
- Burbidge, Pauline (2000). Quilt Studio: Innovative Techniques for Confident and Creative Quiltmaking and Design (introduction by Michele Walker). The Quilt Digest Press (NTC/Contemporary Publishing Group, Inc.). ISBN 978-0844220826.
- Burbidge, Pauline; Margetts, Martina (1988). "The Quilt Revival in Britain". Quilt Art. By various authors. Butter, Michaela (ed.). Nottingham Castle Museum. pp. 18–24. ISBN 9780905634159.
- Burbidge, Pauline (1981). Making Patchwork for Pleasure and Profit. London: John Gifford. ISBN 978-0707106335.

== See also ==
- Quilt art
- List of British artists
- List of English women artists
- List of quilters

== Further reading and information ==
- Audin, Heather (2013). Patchwork and Quilting in Britain. Bloomsbury Publishing. p. 59. ISBN 9780747814146.
- Barker, Vicki; Bird, Tessa (1990). The Fine Art of Quilting. Studio Vista. ISBN 978-0289800294.
- Border Textile Group. "April: Pauline Burbidge".
- Brown, Glen R. (April–May 2010). "Perspectives: Art, Craft, Design & the Studio Quilt". American Craft. Vol. 70, no. 2. pp. 32–33.
- Cockburn, Ken; Carter, James (2005). Tweed Rivers: New Writing and Art Inspired by the Rivers of the Tweed Catchment. Luath Press Ltd. ISBN 978-1905222254.
- Craft Scotland – Maker – Pauline Burbidge: work
- Duffey Harding, Judith; Harris, Dr Jennifer; McMorris, Penny (2004). Portfolio Collection Vol. 34: Pauline Burbidge. Bristol: Telos Art Publishing. ISBN 1 902015 71 1.
- Hall, Jo. "The Sewing Room: Inside the studio of art quilter Pauline Burbidge". Embroidery: The Textile Art Magazine. No. November/December 2021. pp. 52–53.
- Healey, Elizabeth (2016). Stitch, Fabric & Thread: An Inspirational Guide for Creative Stitchers. Search Press. p. 24. ISBN 9781781266939.
- Hill, Rosemary (27 November 1998). "Design: In bed with Robert Rauschenberg. The ancient craft of quilt-making has turned to modern art for inspiration". The Independent.
- International Quilt Museum. "World Quilts: The James Story". About World Quilts - The James Story. International Quilt Museum.
- Lintott, Pam; Miller, Rosemary (1992). The Quilt Room: Patchwork and Quilting Workshops. New Holland Publishers Ltd. ISBN 978-1852381646.
- McMorris, Penny; Kile, Michael (1986). The Art Quilt. San Francisco, CA: The Quilt Digest Press. pp. 63–65. ISBN 9780844226491.
- Myers-Newbury, Jan (Summer 2006). "Pauline Burbidge: re-inventing the quilt". Surface Design Journal. 30 (4): 36–41.
- Nihon Vogue (1994). "88 Leaders in the Quilt World Today". Nihon Vogue. Tokyo.
- Nott, Rachel (11 January 2022). "Behind the scenes at The Bowes Museum". Homes & Antiques. Our Media.
- Osler, Dorothy (2021). North Country Quilts: In Celebration of New Acquisitions. The Bowes Museum. ISBN 978-0956843395.
- Pavey, Sue (November–December 2004). "Quiltworks—Visions of the Natural World: Pauline Burbidge / New International Quilts". Crafts. No. 191. pp. 74–75.
- The Quilters' Guild (6 November 2017). "My Honesty Skyline". The Quilters' Guild - News.
- The Scottish Gallery, Edinburgh. "Hedgelines, 2019". The Scottish Gallery.
- The Scottish Gallery, Edinburgh. "Artist Overview". The Scottish Gallery.
- Shaw, Robert (1995). Quilts: A Living Tradition. Hugh Lauter Levin Associates. ISBN 978-0883633243.
- Shaw, Robert (1997). The Art Quilt. Beaux Arts Editions. ISBN 978-0883633250. Shaw's work, published in 1997, remains the most complete published study of quilt art.
- Sielman, Martha; Bavor, Nancy; Ellis, Lisa (2018). "2000s: Pauline Burbidge (UK) and Noriko (Japan) and Chunghie Lee (South Korea)". In Sider, Sandra (ed.). Art Quilts Unfolding: 50 Years of Innovation. Schiffer Publishing Ltd. ISBN 978-0764356261.
- Springall, Diana (2005). Inspired to Stitch: 21 Textile Artists. A & C Black Publishers Ltd. ISBN 978-0713669862.
- Walker, Michele (1985). Quilt Making in Patchwork and Appliqué. London: Ebury Press. ISBN 978-0852234334.
- Walker, Michele (1990). The Passionate Quilter: Ideas and Techniques from Leading Quilters. London: Ebury Press. ISBN 978-0852238851.
- White, Alison (May–June 2021). "North Country Quilts: In Celebration of New Acquisitions, until November 2021, The Bowes Museum, Barnard Castle". Selvedge. No. 100. pp. 91–93.
- Zlendich, Janice (12 January 2000). "Book Review: Quilt Studio". Library Journal. 125 (20): 128.

Other media:

- 2022: Documentary, Pauline Burbidge, a film by Dominic Clemence
- 2020: Podcast interview, Fen Ditton Gallery, Artist Interview with Pauline Burbidge
- 2018: Interview, School of Stitched Textiles, Pauline Burbidge: Contemporary Quilter
- 2015: Interviews, Crafts Council, First Decade Project
- 2015: Interview, The Bowes Museum, What are Quiltscapes & Quiltline?
- 2010: Interview, the British Library: National Life Stories: Crafts Lives
- 1987: Documentary (interview), Channel 4 TV: Pieced Pictures
