= Constance Howard =

Constance Howard may refer to:

- Constance Howard (actress)
- Constance Howard (artist)
- Constance A. Howard, member of the Illinois House of Representatives
