= Diana Springall =

British textile artist (born 1938)

Diana Springall MBE
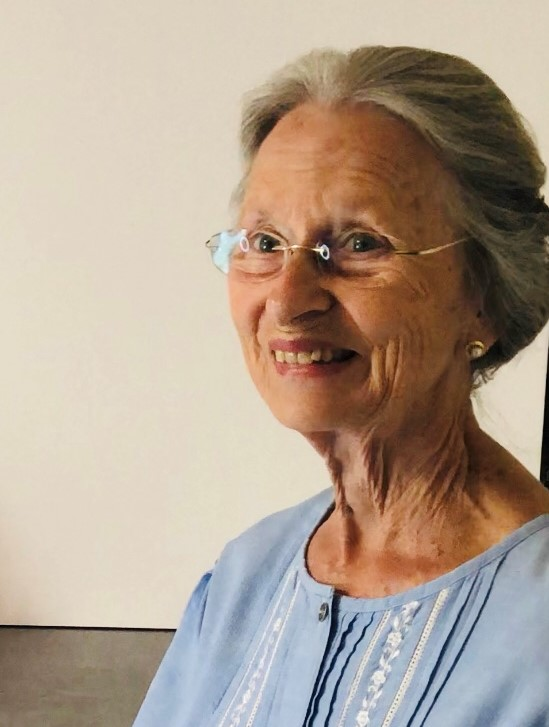
- Diana Springall in 2022
- Born: Diana Springall (née Alexander); 16 September 1938 (age 88); Simla, India
- Known for: Contemporary textiles
- Movement: Contemporary art of embroidery
- Spouse: Ernest Thomas Springall (m. 1960; div. 1977)
- Partner: David Daniel Auguste Piésold (died 2008)
- Children: 2
- Website: www.dianaspringallcollection.co.uk

Diana Springall MBE is, according to the Victoria and Albert Museum, "amongst the most well-known of all British textile artists", who has been committed to raising the profile of the contemporary art of embroidery through the Diana Springall Collection. Her work is held in private and public collections worldwide. As well as creating art and teaching, Springall has held various appointments including chair of both the Embroiderers' Guild and the Society of Designer Craftsmen. Throughout her career, Springall has campaigned for the promotion of embroidery as a true art form. She has assembled the Diana Springall Collection, an extensive collection of contemporary pieces from various artists showcasing embroidery as fine art.

== Biography ==
=== Early life ===
Diana Alexander was born in Simla, India, on 16 September 1938, where her father, Gordon Alexander, was Under Secretary of State in the Indian Civil Service. Cared for by a governess and an ayah, Diana and her brother Brian had little opportunity to mix with other children. With family time reserved for Sundays, the pair became well practised at entertaining themselves. For Diana this included learning to paint and stitch. Because her mother, Stella Fuller, was a needlewoman, she was immersed in domestic embroidery. Her initial understanding of stitch in India shaped her character and her creativity.

=== Education ===
Springall's family left India for post-war Britain in 1947. Uncertain of further overseas postings, the siblings were sent to boarding school in Scotland. While there, they spent the school holidays in the embroidery-filled home of their great-aunt and grandfather. When, two years later, her parents settled in Kent, Springall attended the nearby Lillesden School in Hawkhurst where her art teacher, Nina Guppy, was inspirational in her choice of career.

After seven years at Lillesden, Springall received offers from all five of the art schools to which she applied. She chose to study the National Diploma in Design (NDD) in Painting at Goldsmiths College, University of London.

Springall received her NDD in 1960 and remained at Goldsmiths for a further year to take an Art Teachers' Certificate. This course required the practice of several crafts, including embroidery. Between 1954 and 1975, under the headship of Constance Howard, embroidery received equal qualification to painting, sculpture, and illustration at Goldsmiths College. It was a remarkable time for the art of embroidery, which saw the emergence of now well-known names: Anne Morrell, Audrey Walker, Christine Risley and Eirian Short.

Springall received the Certificate of Embroidery by the City & Guilds of London Institute in 1963. She graduated in 1968 with a Diploma in History of Art and was awarded a personal accolade of Recognition status by the University of London.

=== Personal life ===
In 1960, Springall married Ernest Thomas Springall. They divorced in 1977. David Daniel Auguste Piésold (1923–2008), a civil engineer, was her partner for 30 years.

Springall has two sons from her marriage; Richard Gordon Springall (born in 1965) and Lawrence Thomas Springall (born in 1969).

== Career ==
After completing her education, Springall started her artistic career creating work alongside being a full-time senior lecturer, a freelance tutor, and an external examiner. She published her first book, Canvas Embroidery, in 1969 and has published four further books since then.

Springall's major commissions include a panel for the London office of Mobil North Sea (1988), a carpet and panel for the entrance of Dai-Ichi Kangyo Bank, London (1989) and a memorial panel, Logica London, 1991.

In 1988, she was commissioned to create a seven-panel wall hanging for the University of Sheffield Library, by the Convocation of the University. In 2021, she was consulted about the conservation of this piece.

As off 2022, Springall largely works to commission. Her work has appeared numerous times in the Embroidery Magazine.

As well as continued work and curation of her collection, she is also an author and guest speaker and was involved in a BBC series on embroidery in 1980, as a consultant and part presenter. She mentors several emerging artists and was a mentor for the Hand and Lock Embroidery Award in 2021.

In 2025, the University of Sheffield awarded her an Honorary Doctor of Letters, recognising her contributions to the arts, her longstanding advocacy for embroidery, and her creation of Graduation, a large-scale textile artwork installed in the University’s Western Bank Library since 1988.

== Artistic legacy ==
Springall's commitment to embroidery as true art is reflected in her body of work, her leadership roles, her writing, and the on-going curation of her collection.

As Chair of the Embroiderers' Guild, she was instrumental in establishing embroidery as a form of artistic expression rather than something simply functional. Her influence has made a substantial contribution to embroidery's recognition as fine art.

Springall brought her painter's eye to the teaching of and writing about embroidery, emphasising the critical importance of a consistent approach to creating art whether it be painting or embroidery.

=== The Diana Springall Collection ===
Springall started acquiring artworks for her collection in 1964 with a piece by Goldsmiths' student Suzanne Armitt.

Her collection includes textiles from the mid-1960s to the present and illustrates the breadth of the world of stitch.

This collection stems from wanting to create a teaching collection so that her students could see and handle the real work.

In line with her endeavour to share the value of embroidery as an art form, Springall is rigorous with her selection of pieces, always buying direct from the artist to form a connection and thereby understand the context of the work. Her collection includes work by emerging artists alongside those who are already known.

The Diana Springall Collection is visible online.

== Publications ==
- Embroidery author and design consultant, BBC 2 TV series of ten 25-minute programmes, 1980
- Springall, Diana (1984). Igirisu no gendai shishū イギリスの現代刺繍 [Contemporary British embroidery] (in Japanese). Gakken. ISBN 9784051004811. Alternative title: Twelve British Embroiderers. NCID BN07042933.
- Springall, Diana (1985). Eikoku gendai shishū 12-nin no sakuhinten: Heisai koten shishū tokubetsu tenji 英国現代刺しゅう12人の作品展 併催古典刺しゅう特別展示 [Work by 12 contemporary British embroiderers: Special joint exhibition of classical embroidery] (in Japanese). et al. Osaka: Daimaru. OCLC 704173822. NCID BA55970098.
- Springall, Diana (1988). Design for Embroidery. Pelham Books. ISBN 9780720717556.
- Springall, Diana (2005). Inspired to Stitch: 21 textile artists. A & C Black. ISBN 9780713669862. Winner of Textile Book of the Year prize 2006
- Springall, Diana (1969). Canvas Embroidery. B. T. Batsford. ISBN 9780713426021.
- "Ambassador of embroidery" by June Hill Embroidery May/June 2019
- Hill, June (2011). Diana Springall: A Brave Eye. London: A&C Black. ISBN 9781408147078.
- Hemmings, Jessica (1 April 2008). "An Embroiderer's Eye". Jessica Hemmings Textile Writer.

== Public collections ==
- Victoria & Albert Museum
- Embroiderers' Guild

== Awards and recognition ==
=== Professional societies ===
- 1978-1985 Chairman, Emeritus and Life Member of The Embroiderers' Guild
- 1984 Elected Fellow of The Royal Society of Arts. Life member
- 1987-1990 Chairman and Fellow of The Society of Designer Craftsmen
- 2006 Elected Honorary Member of '62 Group
- 2017 Elected Ambassador for The Textile Society
- 2018 Received the Freedom of the City of London
- 2019 Liveryman of The Worshipful Company of Broderers
- 2022 Honorary Fellowship of The Society of Designer Craftsmen
- 2025 Awarded an Honorary Doctor of Letters by the University of Sheffield.
