= Springall =

Springall is an English surname. Notable people with the surname include:

- Alejandro Springall, Mexican film director and producer
- Charles Springall (1925–2006), English comedian, actor, writer, and singer
- Diana Springall (born 1938), British textile artist
- John Springall (1932–2020), British cricketer
- Wayne Springall (born 1956), Australian rugby player
