= Audrey Walker =

English textile artist (1928–2020)

Audrey Walker MBE
- Born: 3 July 1928
- Died: 17 November 2020 (aged 92)
- Education: Edinburgh College of Art; Slade School of Art
- Occupation: Artist
- Known for: Textile art

Audrey Walker (3 July 1928 to 17 November 2020) was an accomplished textile artist, embroiderer and teacher, who was active from the 1970s and 1990s in United Kingdom. Walker became known for developing an innovative style of embroidery based on fine threads applied by machine and by hand, to create striking figurative wall-hung works of art. Walker described her work as evolving from fairly fluid ideas, and the process as being akin to drawing with fabrics.

== Early life and education ==
An only child, Walker was born to parents Stanley Walker and Jessie Sewell in Workington, Cumbria, in 1928. Her secondary education took place at the local grammar school. Her talents and interest in art, encouraged by her school art teacher, led her to pursue studies in art, firstly at Edinburgh College of Art, from 1944 to 1948, and then at The Slade School of Art in London from 1948 to 1951.

== Career ==
After graduation as a prize-winning young artist from The Slade School, Walker progressed to teaching posts in schools, in Leeds and in London. Her approach to teaching art at Parliament Hill School was exciting and innovative to the pupils as she introduced new activities such as sketching outdoors and visits to exhibitions and the Royal College of Art.

While continuing to teach, she attended Embroidery classes at the Embroiderers' Guild, becoming inspired by textiles in the British Museum and Victoria and Albert Museum. Ten years after graduating from art college, she began to progress from painting to exploring the medium of embroidery and textile-based art.

In the mid-1960s she joined the then ground-breaking co-operative of artists the 62 Group of Textile Artists. As part of a supportive pressure-group of young graduates, who sought to give practicing textile artists a wider critical audience, she was encouraged to develop her own unique style of sewing and embroidery.

In an interview with the Victoria and Albert Museum, she records her influences:

Trigger points are really varied and often completely unexpected. I've found myself responding to the words and rhythms of popular songs - they can be quite affecting (as Dennis Potter discovered). Sometimes it is a sentence or two read or heard on the radio (I jot them down in my notebooks). Quite often, it is an encounter with some ancient thing - a fragment of a Greek sculpture, a tiny figure in a medieval embroidery. Then there are the old, old stories - Paradise lost by Adam and Eve... a woman turned to stone...

Her experience of school-teaching prompted her to enter a career in higher education as lecturer in painting at the Whitelands College, Roehampton. Here she was able to experiment to a greater degree with embroidered, stitched, and overlain fabrics. The final 13 years of her teaching career were spent as Head of the Department of Textiles at Goldsmiths, University of London. She retired from Goldsmiths in 1988. During her time there she was an influential educator, broadening its textiles course from a purely stitch-based one to an approach which embraced many other textiles practices. Walker was appointed a Member of the Most Excellent Order of the British Empire (MBE) for "Services to the Arts" in 1993. After her retirement she moved to Wales to concentrate on her art work.

== Artistic output ==
Walker's artistic medium was primarily textile art. Her techniques involved sewing stitches both by hand and by machine over a wide range of fabrics, such as cotton, wool, silk and organza, in order to create an image. Her pieces often resemble enigmatic or wistful portraits, and her inspiration is sometimes derived from Titian, Rembrandt and Greek sculpture. Some of her pieces of art appear as if examples of still life. She participated in numerous group exhibitions and held solo exhibitions in Ruthin Craft Centre, Goldsmiths’ College University of London and Knitting and Stitching shows in London, Dublin, Harrogate.

== Legacy ==
Walker was a founding member of the Fishguard Arts Society, and later one of its trustees. She was an embroidery adviser for The Last Invasion Tapestry held in Fishguard, Wales, which commemorates the last large-scale onslaught on Britain shores by French forces in 1797, known as Battle of Fishguard. This large piece of embroidery, measuring 30 metres by 53 cm, is modelled on the Bayeux Tapestry. In 2009, with her former Goldsmiths teaching colleague Eirian Short, she designed the Pembrokeshire Banner, celebrating Welsh history and culture. This appliqued and embroidered panel, created by Pembrokeshire Guild of Embroiderers and Fishguard Arts Society, is now on permanent public display in the East Cloister, St David's Cathedral. Walker's output in the field of textile art was considerable. Her pieces of textile art may be found in private collections in Canada, Australia and the United Kingdom, in the Victoria and Albert Museum, London, and in public museums and galleries in Reading, Leicestershire, Bedfordshire and Kent. Examples of her drawings and stitched work were collected by teacher and embroiderer Diana Springall and may be seen in the Diana Springall Collection.
