= 62 Group of Textile Artists =

International textile organisation

The 62 Group of Textile Artists is an international group of professional textile artists founded in the United Kingdom in 1962. The group is a Constituted Artists Co-operative, focussed on exhibiting the work of its members in the UK and overseas. Membership of the group is achieved through a selection process. The 62 Group requires members to submit work to a selection panel of their peers for every exhibition "If members fail to submit, or are rejected for three successive exhibitions, then membership is forfeited...a policy which ensures that the group consistently produces exciting work." The increased profile of textile art and its evolution in the latter part of the 20th century "has to a great extent been dictated by members of the 62 Group."

== Objectives ==
The main objectives of the group are:

- To promote Textile Art in major national and international venues
- To provide facilities for its members to exhibit and sell their work
- To create opportunities for the growth and exchange of ideas
- To encourage the exploration of new directions
- To encourage links with international textile groups
- To promote and encourage greater awareness of textile art through education

== History ==
Founding members Alison Erridge (née Liley), Jennifer Gray and Joy Clucas invited a group of embroidery teachers to attend a meeting at The Embroiderers' Guild in London in November 1962. They were concerned about the limited professional opportunities available to embroidery graduates at the time. Contemporary embroidery was hard to find and there was little written about it. The first meeting brought together people from a wide range of backgrounds. Embroidery graduates were frustrated because galleries would not take work "if they thought it was a woman's hobby". The 62 Group "came really up out of several students from colleges determined to get it [embroidery] shown" The meeting also included Audrey Tucker, Pat Scrase, Judy Barry and Marie Shawcross. This meeting created a formal link with the Embroiderers' Guild and at this point, any embroiderer could become a member. Early in the group's existence (1964–65), members realised that the open membership created problems with the quality and consistency of work submitted for exhibitions. It was around this time that selection for membership and exhibitions was instigated and became a fundamental principle of the constitution. This shift also brought about a change to the group's title, as they became 'The Professional Group of the Embroiderers' Guild'.

The first exhibition was remembered by Audrey Walker: "It consisted mostly of small framed panels but the quality of the drawing, design and the subject matter was really remarkable". Walker reflects 'I thought, this is amazing. Why don't I know about this?' By 1965, she had joined the 62 Group and was exhibiting. 'Jan Beaney was terrific, she insisted I joined. It was wonderful to have the support of this group. To share a passion.'

The Group was then sponsored by the Art Exhibitions Bureau, an organisation which toured exhibitions throughout the UK. This enabled the group to reach a wider public and to make sales of artwork. The increased pressure to produce artwork became a problem and so touring finished after two years. Following this the group were successful in securing exhibitions at London venues including The Royal Festival Hall (1967), The Victoria & Albert Museum (1970 and 1972), the Commonwealth Institute (1972) and TUC Congress House (1970 and 1972). This period helped to establish a regular programme of exhibitions for the group.

Twenty years after the group was first founded members recognised that the term 'embroidery' was limiting to the scope of the group and the decision was made to open membership to artists of any textile discipline. Formal ties with the Embroiderers' Guild were severed and the group was renamed 'The 62 Group of Textile Artists'. A 1997 review of The 62 Group exhibition 'The Language of Touch' questions if, after broadening the range of textiles disciplines, "one wonders if it is not also too diverse. Does the backbone of embroiderers and stitchers wish to be faced with competition from, for example, classic tapestry weavers? It is not absolutely clear where the group will go from here." An article in Fibrearts mentions the same exhibition and comments that "The extraction of old ideas and injection of new ideas were of benefit. The result was a leaner, stronger body of work than had been seen before. The avant-garde was made up of new members."

Throughout the 62 Group's history, many members have been teachers, lecturers and academics, influencing the future of textile art through their support for textiles in arts education: "we have had a major influence in expanding the acceptance of experimental textiles into the general curriculum in schools, colleges and universities". The group's members have also contributed to publishing about contemporary textiles in journals such as World of Embroidery (now Embroidery) and Crafts and have also published books on the subject.

== Exhibitions ==
Between 1963 and 2011 The 62 Group held 85 exhibitions, mainly in the UK but also in Japan, Israel and Netherlands. The group usually has at least one exhibition per year.

- 1962 - 6 Five annual exhibitions held at the Embroiderers' Guild, Wimpole Street, London (from 1964 these toured the UK with the Art Exhibitions Bureau (AEB)
- 1967 Exhibition sent to Australia Exhibition, Royal Festival Hall, London (AEB)
- 1968 Foyles Art Gallery, Charing Cross Road, London
- 1968 Harrogate Art Gallery (AEB)
- 1969 Embroiderers' Guild, Wimpole Street, London
- 1969 Victoria & Albert Museum, London
- 1969 Touring: Wolverhampton; Geffrye Museum, London; Boston; Manchester; Stockport; Wandsworth; Lincoln; Walthamstow; Haverfordwest
- 1970 TUC, Congress House, Great Russell Street, London
- 1970 Inn on the Park, London
- 1971 National Museum of Wales, Cardiff
- 1972 Nottingham Library
- 1972 Commonwealth Institute Gallery, London
- 1972 TUC Congress House, Great Russell Street, London ('10 by 10' to commemorate The 62 Group's 10th anniversary)
- 1973 Cartright Hall, Bradford 'Embroidery and Fabric Collage'
- 1974 Commonwealth Institute Gallery, London 'Embroiderers at Work'
- 1975 National Museum of Wales, Cardiff
- 1975 TUC Congress House, Great Russell Street, London 'Stabiles'
- 1976 Metropole Arts Centre, Folkestone
- 1976 Greenwich Theatre Gallery, Greenwich
- 1978 Commonwealth Institute Gallery, London 'Textile Artists'
- 1979 Woodlands Art Gallery, Greenwich
- 1979 National Museum of Wales, Cardiff
- 1980 Usher Gallery, Lincoln
- 1981 Winchester School of Art Gallery, Winchester
- 1981 John Holden Gallery, Manchester
- 1982 Embroiderers' Guild, Hampton Court Palace, 'Signs and Symbols'(commemorating the 62 Group's 20th Anniversary)
- 1982 Seven Dials Gallery, Covent Garden, London 'Textile Aspects'
- 1983 Victoria Art Gallery, Bath 'Textile Aspects 2'
- 1983 DLI Museum Gallery, Durham
- 1984-1985 Touring Japan; Tokyo, Kyoto, Osaka
- 1985 Touring:Clarendon Park Salisbury (organised by Embroiderers' Guild)
- 1985 Crafts Council Gallery, Belfast; Wexford, Eire; Swansea, Wales; Cheltenham; South Hill Park 'Handspan'
- 1986 Swansea University Gallery 'No More Than a Foot'
- 1986 Stitch Design, Docklands, London 'No More Than a Foot'
- 1987 Leicester Museum and Art Gallery
- 1987 Woodlands Art Gallery
- 1988 Gawthorpe Hall, Lancashire
- 1988 City Art Gallery, Walsall
- 1989 Embroiderers' Guild, Hampton Court Palace](New Members)
- 1989 Collins Gallery, University of Strathclydge, Glasgow 'Crossing the Border'
- 1990 Bradford Textile Arts Festival, Leeds Polytechnic and Salts Mill, Bradford
- 1991 Shipley Art Gallery, Gateshead 'Fascinating Fibres'
- 1991 Oxford Gallery, Oxford
- 1992 Embroiderers' Guild, Hampton Court (commemorating The 62 Group's 30th anniversary) Touring: University of Ulster, Belfast; Collins Gallery, Strathclyde University, Glasgow; Commonwealth Institute, London; Hankyu Art Gallery, Japan
- 1993 Bankfield Museum and Art Gallery, Halifax
- 1993 Textil Plus, The Netherlands
- 1994 Royal Cornwall Museum, Truro
- 1995 Bury Museum and Art Gallery, Lancashire
- 1995 Braintree Museum and Art Gallery, Essex
- 1996 Quarry Bank Mill, Styal, Cheshire
- 1997 Collins Gallery, University of Strathclyde, Glasgow 'The Language of Touch'
- 1997 Shire Hall Gallery, Stafford
- 1998 Drumcroon Arts Centre, Wigan
- 1998 Touring: '50/50: The Challenge of Restraint' The Opera House, Tel Aviv, Israel; Tatton Park, Cheshire; The Knitting & Stitching Shows at Alexandra Palace, London, Dublin, Harrogate.
- 1999 Maidstone Museum and Art Gallery, Kent 'On and Off the Wall'
- 1999 City Centre Art Gallery, Edinburgh
- 2000 Shipley Art Gallery, Gateshead 'Out of the Garden'
- 2001 Cajobah, Birkenhead
- 2001 Bankfield Museum, Halifax 'A Collective Response'
- 2002 Touring 'Red' (commemorating The 62 Group's 40th anniversary), Bury St.Edmunds Art Gallery, Suffolk; Beverley Art Gallery, Yorkshire; Irish Linen Centre and Lisburn Museum, Co Antrim; Up Front Gallery, Penrith, Cumbria; Midlands Arts Centre, Birmingham.
- 2002 Victoria and Albert Museum, London 'In Context'
- 2002 Retrospective at The Knitting & Stitching Shows, Alexandra Palace, London, Dublin and Harrogate. 'In Retrospect' (to commemorate The 62 Group's 40th anniversary)
- 2003 Harley Gallery, Welbeck, Nottinghamshire 'In Place'
- 2004 The Millennium Galleries, Sheffield 'Material Evidence'
- 2005 University Museum of Zoology, Cambridge 'Encounters'
- 2006 Hove Museum and Art Gallery, Sussex 'Tracing Threads'
- 2007 Victoria and Albert Museum, London 'COLLECT' (8 selected members)
- 2007 Touring: Textile Gallery, The Knitting & Stitching Shows, Alexandra Palace, London, Dublin and Harrogate.
- 2008 Rochester Art Gallery, Kent 'Size Matters'
- 2008 Catmose Gallery, Rutland 'Stuff'
- 2009 Touring: The Hub, Sleaford, Lincolnshire 'Bending the Line'
- 2010 Tour continuing: Museum Rijswijk, Rijswijk, The Netherlands; Collins Gallery, University of Strathclyde, Glasgow 'Bending More Lines'
- 2011 Gallery Oldham, Oldham 'At a Tangent'
- 2012 Gallery of Costume, Platt Hall, Manchester 'Interventions'
- 2012 Holden Gallery, Manchester '62@50' (commemorating The 62 Group's 50th anniversary)
- 2012 The Knitting & Stitching Shows, Alexandra Palace, London, Dublin and Harrogate.'50th Anniversary Package Tour'
- 2013 Koyo Gallery, Kyoto '62@50'
- 2013 Constance Howard Gallery, Goldsmiths University of London,'Small Talk'
- 2013 Pink Wood, nr. Bruton, Somerset 'In the Pink' (external installation works)
- 2014 Grimsby Minster and Grimsby Fishing Heritage Centre, Grimsby, Lincolnshire 'Ebb & Flow'
- 2015 Upfront Gallery, Cumbria '62 Group - Now'
- 2016 The Silk Museum, Macclesfield 'Making Space'
- 2017 Touring: The Knitting & Stitching Shows, Olympia, London, Edinburgh, Royal Highland Centre. 'Making Space'
- 2018 MAC, Birmingham 'Ctrl/Shift'
- 2019 Sunny Bank Mills Gallery, Farsley, Leeds 'Construct'
- 2019-2020 Touring: National Centre for Craft & Design, Sleaford and 20-21 Visual Arts, Scunthorpe 'Ctrl/Shift'
- 2021 The Whitaker, Rossendale. 'Connected Cloth'
- 2022 St. Barbe Museum & Art Gallery, Lymington 'Conversations: People, Places, Materials, Objects'
- 2022 Touring: The Knitting & Stitching Shows, Alexandra Palace, London (Oct 2022) and Harrogate Convention Centre, Harrogate (Nov 2022) 'The 62 Group @ 60: Essence'
- 2023-2024 Touring: Sunny Bank Mills Gallery, Farsley, Leeds and National Centre for Craft & Design, Sleaford 'Tailored.'
- 2024 Touring: Salts Mill, Saltaire. The Knitting & Stitching Show, Harrogate (Nov 2024) 'Making as Learning.'
- 2025 Crafts Study Centre, Farnham. 'Joy in the Detail.'
- 2026 Sunny Bank Mills, Farsley. 'Touchlines'

== Members ==
Membership of The 62 Group is by selection. Potential new members apply to the group with examples of their work, and a committee of existing members chooses whether to accept the applicants on the basis of the selection criteria. The membership changes each year as new members join and others leave but usually remains fairly consistent at around 50 exhibiting members. While the group was originally established in the UK, membership is now international with members in the Netherlands, Hungary, South Africa and Japan.

=== Exhibiting membership ===
- Imogen Aust
- Alison Aye
- Louise Baldwin
- Helen Banzhaf
- Claire Barber
- Caroline Bartlett
- Jan Beaney (Honorary exhibiting member)
- Heather Belcher
- Marcia Bennett-Male
- Polly Binns (Honorary exhibiting member)
- Eszter Bornemisza
- Hilary Bower (Honorary exhibiting member)
- Michael Brennand-Wood (Honorary exhibiting member)
- Lucy Brown
- Hazel Bruce
- Daisy May Collingridge
- Isobel Currie
- Helen Davies
- Catherine Dormor (Chair)
- Isabel Fletcher
- Gavin Fry
- Emily Jo Gibbs
- Ann Goddard
- Anna Gravelle
- Julie Heaton
- Christina Hesford
- Rachael Howard
- Woo Jin Joo
- Alice Kettle (Honorary exhibiting member)
- Paddy Killer
- Joanna Kinnersly-Taylor
- Hannah Lamb
- Jean Littlejohn
- Mei Lock (Associate Member)
- Debbie Lyddon (Honorary exhibiting member)
- Jae Maries
- Sian Martin (Honorary exhibiting member)
- Jane McKeating
- Mark McLeish
- Sumi Perera
- Ali Pickard (Associate member)
- Marilyn Rathbone
- Shuna Rendel
- Vanessa Rolf
- Tilleke Schwarz (Honorary exhibiting member)
- Lynn Setterington
- Anne Smith
- Jennifer Smith-Windsor
- Sally Spinks
- Sue Stone (Honorary exhibiting member)
- Andi Walkler
- Jane Walkley
- Hannah White
- Ealish Wilson
- Atsuko Yamamoto
- Helen Yardley
