= Constance Howard (artist) =

English textile artist and embroiderer

Constance Howard MBE
- Constance Howard
- Born: 8 December 1910; Abington, Northamptonshire, England
- Died: 2 July 2000 (aged 89); Hindhead, Surrey, England
- Education: Northampton School of Art; Royal College of Art
- Known for: Textile arts and embroidery
- Spouse(s): Harold Wilson Parker, m.1945 – his death.

Constance Mildred Howard, later Constance Parker, (8 December 1910 – 2 July 2000) was an English textile artist and embroiderer who had a profound impact on the development and teaching of those subjects in Britain. The Constance Howard Gallery, part of Goldsmiths, University of London, is named in her honour.

== Biography ==
Howard was born in Abington in Northampton to Mildred Annie Abbott and Arthur Howard, a school teacher. From the age of ten she began taking weekly classes at the Northampton School of Art and subsequently won a scholarship that allowed her to attend full-time when she turned 14. From 1931, Howard was a student at the Royal College of Art in London where she was taught by both Eric Ravilious and Edward Bawden. After graduating in 1935, Howard taught at the Cardiff School of Art where she established a course in dress design. During World War II she taught at the Kingston School of Art where she and her students embroidered maps for the RAF. In December 1945 Howard married the sculptor Harold Wilson Parker and gave up teaching but began exhibiting with the Arts and Crafts Exhibition Society.

Howard returned to teaching in 1947 on a part-time basis with embroidery classes at Goldsmiths in south-east London. In 1950, Howard designed a large textile hanging for the country pavilion of the Festival of Britain exhibition in London. The Country Wife was completed by Howard and her students, who included Mary Quant, and depicted the activities of the National Federation of Women's Institutes. In 1953, Goldsmith's established a separate department of embroidery and in 1958 Howard became its head of department. In 1964, embroidery and textile design became a main subject area for the diploma in art and design at the college. As well as traditional embroidery skills, Howard encouraged the use of new techniques, including several of her own invention, and the production of wholly abstract designs often with unconventional materials. Howard also became an examiner and ran classes for the Embroiderers' Guild and undertook lecture tours to Australia, Canada, New Zealand and the United States.

Howard retired from Goldsmiths in 1975 but continued to exhibit, give guest lectures and wrote several books on the textile arts, notably her four-volume work Twentieth-Century Embroidery in Great Britain which was published between 1981 and 1986. Howard was awarded the MBE in 1975 for services to Art Education and in 1980, Goldsmiths opened the Constance Howard Gallery alongside a textile resource and research collection which contains Howard's own archive and lifetime collection of textiles.

Works by Howard are held by Northampton Museum and Art Gallery, the Victoria and Albert Museum and are in the British Council collection. She designed ecclesiastical works for Lincoln Cathedral and Makerere University in Uganda and produced 200 kneelers for the College Chapel at Eton College.

== Published works ==
- Design for Embroidery from Traditional English Sources, 1956
- Inspiration for Embroidery, 1966
- Embroidery and Colour, 1976
- Textile Crafts, 1977
- The Constance Howard Book of Stitches, 1979
- Twentieth-Century Embroidery in Great Britain, 4 volumes, 1981-1986.
