= The Quilters' Guild of the British Isles =

Guild and charity based in York, England

Coordinates: 53.9605°N 1.0758°W

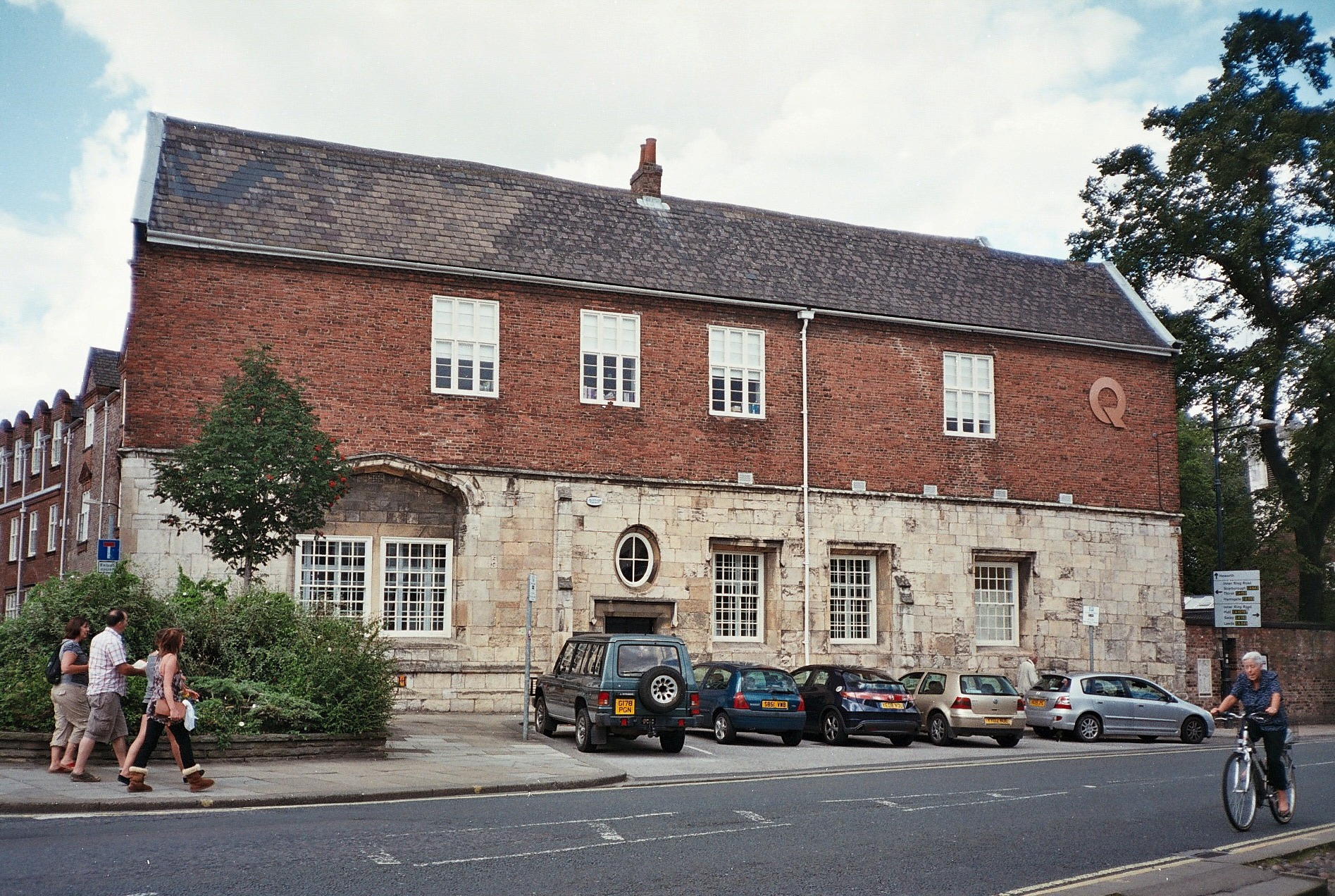
- St Anthony's Hall, a 15th-century hall which was once a meeting-place for York's medieval guilds. It is the headquarters for The Quilters' Guild of the British Isles.
- Type: Charitable organization
- Location: York, England
- Website: https://www.quiltersguild.org.uk/

The Quilters' Guild of the British Isles was formed in 1979 and promotes and maintains for the public benefit the art history heritage and techniques of the allied crafts of patchwork, appliqué and quilting. It is the national organisation representing quilt makers throughout the country. Traditional and contemporary work is of equal importance within the guild, and membership is open to anyone who works in patchwork, appliqué and quilting or has an interest in quilts. The guild holds charitable status, and is based in St Anthony's Hall, York.

== Museum ==
The former Quilters' Guild Museum Collection, which opened in St Anthony's Hall, on 7 June 2008 but closed on 31 October 2015, was Britain's first museum dedicated to the history of British quilt making and textile arts. The museum was founded and operated by the Quilters' Guild, which continues to care for its collection of more than 600 historic and contemporary quilts and to make acquisitions. The guild continues to explore a wide range of opportunities for items from the collection to be exhibited in other locations.

== See also ==
- International Quilt Museum in Lincoln, Nebraska, US
- National Quilt Museum in Paducah, Kentucky, US
- Southeastern Quilt & Textile Museum in Carrollton, Georgia, US
