= Ruthin Craft Centre =

Craft centre in Ruthin, Wales

Ruthin Craft Centre, The Centre for the Applied Arts
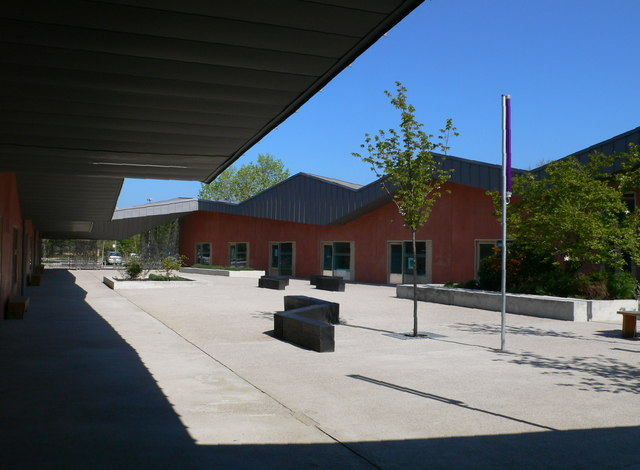
- The inner courtyard of Ruthin Craft Centre

- Location within Wales
- Established: 2008; 18 years ago
- Location: Ruthin, Denbighshire, North Wales, United Kingdom
- Coordinates: 53°07′01″N 3°18′34″W
- Visitors: 49,717 (2014)
- Director: Philip Hughes
- Public transit access: Nearest Railway Stations are Chester and Wrexham where local buses run direct to Ruthin
- Website: www.ruthincraftcentre.org.uk

Ruthin Craft Centre (Welsh: Canolfan Grefft Rhuthun) is a craft centre in the town of Ruthin, north Wales.

Ruthin Craft Centre shows the best in national and international contemporary applied arts.

The original Craft Centre was demolished early in 2007, and a new Craft Centre opened in July 2008 in a £4.3 million scheme which contains six craft workshops, larger galleries and an expanded craft retail gallery, two residency studios, an education space and a tourist information centre, as well as a restaurant.

The new building, by architects Sergison Bates has been widely recognised, winning the 2009 Dewi-Prys Thomas Prize, being shortlisted for the 2009 Art Fund Prize and highlighted as a 'Design Delight' by the Design Commission for Wales.

The centre is revenue funded by the Arts Council of Wales and is part of Denbighshire County Council.

Director of the Ruthin Craft Centre, Philip Hughes, was interviewed by Culture24 during the Art Fund nomination in 2009. In 2025, Mr. Hughes MBE stepped down as director of Ruthin Craft Centre, to be succeeded by Samantha Rhodes.

== Ruthin Art Trail ==
The art trail was launched first in 2014, costing £250,000 to attract tourists to Ruthin town. The beginning of the trail is located in the Craft Centre, which in itself brings 90,000 visitors each year. The trail consists of ten spy holes, with 22 figures on buildings and roofs throughout the town to give a flavour of the history and folklore of Ruthin. These "spy holes" include various portrayals of Ruthin's history, from an illustration of the old livestock market, to the myth of a wild dog. Small metal figures have also been devised.

The trail is designed to tour people around Ruthin, set out with oak benches and freshly planted trees which are designed to encourage people to explore the town further. The tourists would be led up Market Street, across St. Peter's square, down Clwyd Street which leads to the Old Gaol, and through a series of other streets that will take them back to Market Street.

The art trail was designed by Lucy Strachan, who wanted to encourage people to discover the town of Ruthin. The artists and designers took advice from a former secondary school head teacher and local historian regarding Ruthin's heritage and legends.
