= Embroiderers' Guild =

Needlework organization

The Embroiderers' Guild is the UK's leading educational charity promoting embroidery. The New South Wales branch was formed in 1955.

== History ==
The guild was formed in September 1906 at a meeting of sixteen ex-students of the Royal School of Art Needlework, under the name The Society of Certificated Embroideresses of the Royal School of Art Needlework. Miss Wade, head of the Royal School of Art Needlework was invited to be founder President, and Miss Scott who hosted the inaugural meeting and Beatrice Paulson Townsend, wife of W.G. Paulson Townsend, design master at the school, were invited to be vice-chairs. They separated during World War I but reunited after the war and began teaching embroidery to shell shocked and disabled servicemen as a form of occupational therapy.

In 1920 Louisa Frances Pesel (1870-1947) was appointed as the first President. By the outbreak of the Second World War, the Guild had expanded well beyond London, establishing regional branches (and one in Yorkshire in 1934).

An Australian artist Margaret Oppen came to study at the Royal School of Needlework and she joined the Embroidery Guild. When she returned to Sydney she led a group who decided to open a branch of the guild in New South Wales. With permission of the guild's patron, Queen Mary, the branch was formed in 1955. The NSW Embroiderers Guild have an open competition every other year to celebrate Margaret Oppen.

In the 1960s an offshoot of the Embroiderers' Guild was developed as a platform to exhibit professional embroidery to the public. Founded in 1962 and originally named 'The Professional Group of the Embroiderers' Guild', the group brought attention to textile art nationally and internationally. Around twenty years later the group was later renamed The 62 Group of Textile Artists when the group decided to extend beyond embroidery and encompass other textile disciplines.

The Guild's centre at Bucks County Museum is a registered museum and holds a nationally significant, global collection of embroideries from early times to the present day.

The Guild and its members have created and exhibited works inspired by the 2012 London Olympics (over 2000 postcard sized images of participating nations); in partnership with the British Library and Ruskin College, Oxford led the design and creation of a piece designed by Cornelia Parker commemorating the 800th anniversary of Magna Carta; in partnership with the Landscape Institute/National Trust/English Heritage the Guild created over 40 exhibitions of work inspired by the life and times of Lancelot 'Capability' Brown (2015/2016) and in 2016 the Guild was commissioned by the London representatives of HBO Television to create a piece 3.3 metres high and 5.5 metres long depicting the WhiteWalker from 'A Game of Thrones' - 'The Hardhome Embroidery'. This piece was exhibited at 10 venues throughout the UK.

== Financial crisis ==
In 2021 it was reported that the Guild was in financial crisis. Local branches had had their bank accounts frozen by the Guild. Some members had been unhappy for years about the way the Guild was run. Some members criticised the high salary received by the CEO, who was not himself an embroiderer, and who has been described as "a highly paid male specialist in corporate turnarounds" running an organisation whose members are mostly women. Some Guild members used craftivism to make their concerns public. The meeting held by trustees for members to discuss this and to vote on the future of the branches has been called "At the very best ... a PR nightmare. At the worst, it was the outward expression of a charity that was already eating itself whole". The trustees' proposal to close the branches was carried. Each branch will have a grant of at least £250 to establish itself as an independent group.
